= Elections in Samoa =

In Samoa, elections are held for the national unicameral parliament, the Legislative Assembly, and the ceremonial head of state, the O le Ao o le Malo. Samoan citizens directly elect 51 members of the Legislative Assembly. If the women's quota is unfulfilled following an election, which requires female members to make up at least 10% of the Legislative Assembly, up to six of the highest polling unsuccessful women contestants can be appointed to the legislature. The O le Ao o le Malo is indirectly elected by members of the Legislative Assembly.

Samoa's political system encompasses traditional Faʻamatai (chiefly) and Westminster aspects. The country has held elections since the 1870s, although voting was mostly limited to matai until the introduction of universal suffrage in 1991. Candidates for parliament still have to be holders of matai titles. The first years after Samoa gained independence in 1962 saw a period of consensus politics. Elections gradually became more competitive after factional politics emerged, and political parties began appearing after 1979. Parties usually lack clear ideologies and have often engaged in clientelism and patronage to secure support from voters.

== Voting ==
Samoa holds direct elections for the Legislative Assembly - the unicameral chamber of Parliament, and indirect elections for the ceremonial post of O le Ao o le Malo (head of state). As Samoa uses the parliamentary system of government, the prime minister, the nation's head of government, is not directly elected. The prime minister is instead chosen from among the members of parliament (MP), and is usually the leader of the largest party or coalition in the Legislative Assembly. Elections are not held for the village councils, the government entities at the local level, which use the Faʻamatai system, the traditional pre-colonial form of Samoan governance.

=== Parliamentary elections ===
Elections to the Legislative Assembly are conducted through the first-past-the-post electoral system, in which a candidate requires only a plurality of votes to win. MPs serve a term of up to five years, which was increased from three years in 1993. The prime minister can advise the O le Ao o le Malo to call a snap election. Samoans elect 51 members of the Legislative Assembly, each of whom represents a single-member constituency. Constitutional amendments passed in 2013 introduced a female quota, which took effect in 2016, mandating that at least 10% of members were women. If this quota is not met after an election, the electoral commission can appoint up to six unsuccessful female candidates to parliament who received the most votes. The number of directly elected seats was increased from 49 to 51 in 2021. Before 2021, the 10% quota equated to around five female MPs. After the increase of parliament's membership, uncertainty arose about whether the presence of five or six female MPs fulfilled the 10% quota, as a definitive number was not included in the legislation. After the 2021 constitutional crisis, the Court of Appeal ruled that parliament needed to have six female MPs to satisfy the quota. Candidates for the Legislative Assembly must be a Samoan citizen, at least 21 years old, hold a matai title and have resided in Samoa for at least three years before the nomination date. Vacancies during a legislative term are filled through by-elections, which are triggered through an MP's resignation or death. Shortly before the 2021 election, parliament passed a bill requiring MPs to vacate their seats if they change their party affiliation during a legislative term. The MPs in question must then contest a by-election to retain their seat.

=== O le Ao o le Malo ===
The O le Ao o le Malo is elected by the Legislative Assembly, requiring a majority of votes to win. The head of state serves a five-year term, and since the passage of a constitutional amendment in 2019, can serve no more than two terms. The Constitution determined that the first two co-holders of the office, Tupua Tamasese Meaʻole and Malietoa Tanumafili II, would retain the post for life, with their successors being elected thereafter. Meaʻole died in 1963, with Tanumafili remaining the sole O le Ao o le Malo until his death in 2007. That year, the Legislative Assembly held the first election for head of state, which saw Tui Ātua Tupua Tamasese Efi, a former prime minister and son of Meaʻole, elected to the post. Candidates for O le Ao o le Malo must be a Samoan citizen, eligible to run for the Legislative Assembly, and not have been removed from office.

=== Eligibility ===
Universal suffrage was approved during a referendum in 1990, granting all Samoan citizens aged 21 and over the right to vote, which took effect at the 1991 general election. Before 1991, suffrage was limited to individuals with matai titles and the electorate of the Individual Voters constituency, which comprised citizens with non-Samoan ancestry. Voting has been compulsory since 2021; citizens who fail to vote must pay a 100 tālā fine. Eligible individuals who do not enrol to vote are liable to pay a 2000 tālā fine. Samoan citizens residing outside the country must travel to Samoa to vote. Electors must enrol to vote in constituencies where they are permanent residents. Voters, however, are permitted to register instead in constituencies where they do not reside, provided they are a matai seeking to stand in a constituency where their matai title is registered, are the wife of said candidate or are the spouse of a contestant running in the electorate.

== History ==
=== Pre-colonial and colonial eras (1873–1961) ===
Samoa first held elections in 1873 following the adoption of a constitution that year, which established a centralised government. Suffrage was limited to matai, who elected members of the bicameral parliament, the Taʻimua (upper house) and the Faipule (lower house). Members of both houses of parliament were high-ranking matai and represented the traditional political districts. Elections to the Taʻimua and the Faipule consisted of electors engaging in negotiations with one another until they reached a unanimous decision on a candidate choice.

Samoa was colonised and split in 1900, with the German Empire assuming control of the western portion of the archipelago, while the United States occupied the eastern islands. The German colonial administration retained the Faipule, but reduced it to an advisory body. New Zealand took over Western Samoa at the onset of the First World War in 1914. The New Zealand administration established a Legislative Council composed mostly of appointed members, with a few elected seats. Voting for the elected Legislative Council seats was limited to European men, initially those who owned property worth or earned a salary of £200. In 1938, the franchise was extended to all Europeans and individuals with mixed Samoan-European ancestry. Chinese residents were also granted the right to vote after gaining European status shortly before the 1951 election.

The Fono of Faipule gained legal recognition from the New Zealand administration in 1923. The Mau movement, which advocated for independence, called for members of the Faipule to be elected, which was granted in 1936 by the New Zealand government after sending a "goodwill mission". Only matai were eligible to vote in Faipule elections. The Legislative Assembly replaced the Legislative Council in 1948, and comprised elected members with European status and some Samoan members appointed by the Faipule. At the 1954 constitutional convention, held in preparation for self-governance, delegates, who were largely matai, decided to retain the electoral system, restricting candidacy and voting to individuals with matai titles. The convention argued that, as matai were chosen by their families, political participation among the wider public would be confirmed while preserving traditional Samoan values. The convention also recommended the merger of the Faipule into the Legislative Assembly, which occurred before the 1957 election.

=== Post independence (since 1962) ===
Samoa gained independence from New Zealand in 1962, following the approval of the Constitution in a referendum the previous year, in which non matai were also permitted to vote. The newly adopted constitution retained the practice of limiting suffrage to matai, except for the electorate of the nationwide Individual Voters constituency, which had two seats. Voters in this constituency were citizens who were not ethnic Samoans or had mixed Samoan and European ancestry. The latter community were allowed to enrol in either the Individual Voters or the general constituencies.

Academic Asofou So‘o characterised the first decade of independence as a period of consensus politics, with much of the electorate and MPs focused on upholding unity. As such, numerous MPs in the 1960s were elected unopposed, often because the village councils in their constituencies had reached a unanimous decision on who to endorse. The first post-independence election, held in 1964, saw 16 of the 47 MPs elected without opposition. Many MPs would not seek re-election per agreements to allow other individuals from different villages in their constituency a turn to serve in parliament.

The aftermath of the 1970 election marked the end of the consensus politics era. By 1976, a decisive opposition faction had emerged, which opposed the newly elected prime minister, Tupuola Efi. Although all candidates still ran as independents, the number of unopposed contestants declined. After failing to defeat Efi at the 1979 election, the opposition faction formed the first post-independence political party, the Human Rights Protection Party (HRPP), which formed a government for the first time after the 1982 election. Numerous other parties gradually emerged thereafter. According to So‘o, most political parties in Samoa have been formed to secure parliamentary support to form a government, and usually lack clear ideologies. With an absence of decisive platforms, So‘o states that parties have resorted to clientelism and patronage to maintain party unity and foster support from the electorate. The HRPP lost power following the 1985 election, when a faction, led by former Prime Minister Vaʻai Kolone, defected and formed a coalition government with Efi's Christian Democratic Party. After the 1988 election, a coalition MP defected to the HRPP, which returned the party to government.

==== Universal suffrage era (since 1991) ====
The introduction of universal suffrage in 1991 significantly increased women's participation. As a consequence of the vast majority of matai holders being men, few women were enfranchised before 1991. HRPP leader and then-prime minister, Tofilau Eti Alesana, stated that his party proposed universal suffrage to improve its chances of winning the 1991 election. The HRPP government also believed that Universal Suffrage would help curb the influence of bribery and treating on election results, arguing that an expanded electoral roll would make it more difficult for candidates to win through this practice.

The Individual Voters' seats were abolished in 2016, with much of its electorate having switched to the general rolls. The seats were replaced with two urban constituencies based in Apia and were primarily designated for voters without ties to traditional villages or who resided on non-customary land in the capital. Voters living in Apia who did have ties to a village could enrol to vote in one of the urban constituencies, as long as they had resided in the capital for at least six months. The creation of the urban seats was influenced by complaints from Apia residents claiming that urban settlers outside the capital had an overbearing influence over the local constituency results. The double-seat constituencies were also abolished, leaving the country with only single-member seats. The urban seats were scrapped ahead of the 2021 election.

During its tenure in government, the HRPP developed a strategy of fielding multiple candidates in constituencies, or having party affiliates run as independents where there was an HRPP incumbent. This method allowed voters to vote out unpopular incumbents and replace them with other HRPP members, thereby maintaining the party's parliamentary majority. The HRPP's era of dominance came to an end at the 2021 election, after it was unseated by the newly founded Faʻatuatua i le Atua Samoa ua Tasi (FAST) party. FAST comprised several former HRPP members, including the-then party leader, Fiamē Naomi Mataʻafa, a former deputy prime minister and the daughter of the first prime minister, Fiamē Mataʻafa Faumuina Mulinuʻu II. A significant factor in FAST's success was the party choosing to field one candidate in most constituencies. As a result, FAST was able to win many seats due to vote-splitting between many HRPP candidates. Prime minister and HRPP leader, Tuilaʻepa Saʻilele Malielegaoi initially refused to concede. Following a prolonged constitutional crisis involving a dispute on the women's quota, the Court of Appeal confirmed FAST's victory. The ruling ended Malielegaoi's premiership of 22 years, while Mata‘afa became Samoa's first female prime minister.

=== Clashes between traditional and Westminster influences ===
The Westminster and traditional matai aspects of Samoa's political system have at times clashed with one another. Unlike other countries that redraw electoral boundaries after a set period and implement modifications to cater to population changes, in Samoa, constituencies are organised around the traditional political districts connected to matai titles to prevent tensions from arising. Population distribution has been less of a priority, resulting in some constituencies having a disproportionately larger electorate than others. Consequently, voters in smaller constituencies have more voting power than electors in larger ones. Due to most constituencies being small, many voters have often been inclined to vote for candidates based on personality over party affiliation. Candidates endorsed by village councils typically perform better than contestants without their support.

Elections before the implementation of universal suffrage in 1991 featured the creation or splitting of numerous matai titles, usually for electoral purposes. Individuals granted titles only to become electors and increase support for particular candidates were known as matai pālota (voting matai). The practice was widely considered controversial. In one case, during a by-election in 1964, two children were bestowed titles. After the introduction of Universal Suffrage, the number of individuals granted titles only to vote sharply decreased.

To reduce undue influence and electoral petition court cases, a 2014 amendment to the Electoral Act forbids candidates from conducting o‘o (also known as momoli) - a Samoan custom in which individuals present gifts to their village or village within their constituency, until after the election.

Contestants must satisfy the custom of monotaga, a requirement of providing village service in the settlement where they were conferred a matai title. An amendment to the Electoral Act in 2015 determined that candidates must provide monotaga for at three years before nomination. The amendment generated controversy especially during the 2016 election, when several candidates were disqualified for not fulfilling monotaga. Some voters accused the government of manipulating Samoan custom for political gain.

== See also ==
- Politics of Samoa
