= List of members of the Legislative Assembly of Western Samoa (1982–1985) =

Members of the Legislative Assembly of Western Samoa were elected on 27 February 1982. The 47 members consisted of 45 Samoans elected in one or two-member constituency and two 'individual voters' elected from a nationwide constituency.

== List of members ==
Constituency	Member	Notes
A'ana Alofi No. 1	Leaupepetele Taoipu	
A'ana Alofi No. 1	Matatumua Maimoana	
A'ana Alofi No. 2	Tufuga Efi	
A'ana Alofi No. 3	Toeolesulusulu Si'ueva	
Aiga-i-le-Tai	Togia Taloa	
Alataua West	Aliimalemanu Sasa	
Aleipata Itupa-i-Lalo	Tafua Kalolo	
Aleipata Itupa-i-Luga	Taua Latu Lome	
Anoamaa East	Savea Sione	
Anoamaa West	Lauofo Meti	
Fa'asaleleaga No. 1	Tofilau Eti Alesana	
Fa'asaleleaga No. 1	Seumanu Aita Ah Wa	
Fa'asaleleaga No. 2	Papalii Laupepa	
Fa'asaleleaga No. 3	Tea Tooala Peato	
Fa'asaleleaga No. 4	Vailolo Filipo	
Falealili	Fuimaono Mimio	
Falealili	Tuatagaloa Ala'ifetu	
Falealupo	Lamusitele Sio	
Faleata East	Faumuina Anapapa	
Faleata West	Toi Aukuso Cain	
Falelatai & Samatau	Manoo Lutena	
Gaga'emauga No. 1	Sala Sio	
Gaga'emauga No. 2	Fa'aso'otauloa Pualagi	
Gaga'emauga No. 3	Seuamuli Kurene	
Gaga'ifomauga No. 1	Lavea Lio	
Gaga'ifomauga No. 2	Sifuiva Sione	
Gaga'ifomauga No. 3	Polataivao Fosi	
Individual Voters	Jack Netzler	
Individual Voters	Peter Rasmussen	
Lefaga & Falease'ela	Le Mamea Ropati	
Lepa	Tuilaepa Aiono Sailele Malielegaoi	
Lotofaga	Asiasiau Sausoo	
Palauli East	Seumanufagai Tufatu	
Palauli-le-Falefa	Le Tagaloa Pita	
Palauli West	Vaovasamanaia Filipo	Replaced by Faiumu Eteuati Toilolo in 1983
Safata	Tuiloma Pule Lameko	
Sagaga-le-Falefa	Aiono Nonumalo Sofara	
Sagaga-le-Usoga	Taliaoa Maoama	
Salega	Leilua Manuao	Replaced by Fepuleai Semi in 1982
Satupa'itea	Asiata Iakopo	
Siumu	Li'o Tusiofo	
Va'a-o-Fonoti	Atiifale Fiso	
Vaimauga East	Fuataga Laulu	
Vaimauga West	Patu Afaese	
Vaimauga West	Asi Sagaga Faamatala	
Vaisigano No. 1	Va'ai Kolone	
Vaisigano No. 2	Lefua Leaana	
Source: Samoa Election Results Database
