= List of members of the Legislative Assembly of Western Samoa (1979–1982) =

Members of the Legislative Assembly of Western Samoa were elected on 24 February 1979. The 47 members consisted of 45 Samoans elected in one or two-member constituency and two 'individual voters' elected from a nationwide constituency.

== List of members ==
| Constituency | Member | Notes |
|---|---|---|
| A'ana Alofi No. 1 | Leaupepetele Taoipu | |
| A'ana Alofi No. 1 | Leaupepe Pita | |
| A'ana Alofi No. 2 | Tufuga Efi | |
| A'ana Alofi No. 3 | Tuigamala Saofaiga | |
| Aiga-i-le-Tai | Mulipola Levaula | |
| Alataua West | Nonumalo Faiga | |
| Aleipata Itupa-i-Lalo | Letiu Tamatoa | |
| Aleipata Itupa-i-Luga | Taua Latu Lome | |
| Anoamaa East | Faamatuainu T. Mailei | |
| Anoamaa West | Leota Leuluaiali'i Ituau Ale | Dismissed in September 1981 |
| Fa'asaleleaga No. 1 | Seumanu Aita Ah Wa | |
| Fa'asaleleaga No. 1 | Tofilau Eti Alesana | |
| Fa'asaleleaga No. 2 | Asi Eikeni | |
| Fa'asaleleaga No. 3 | Toleafoa Talitimu | Talitimu died in 1980. Leulu Laifaga won the subsequent by-election |
| Fa'asaleleaga No. 4 | Aiiloilo Sua | |
| Falealili | Fuimaono Mimio | |
| Falealili | Tuatagaloa Fetu | |
| Falealupo | Aeau Taulupoo | |
| Faleata East | Faumuina Anapapa | |
| Falelatai & Samatau | Aumua Ioane | |
| Gaga'emauga No. 1 | Sala Suivai | |
| Gaga'emauga No. 2 | Fa'aso'otauloa Pualagi | |
| Gaga'emauga No. 3 | Seumuli Kurene | |
| Gaga'ifomauga No. 1 | Lavea Lio | |
| Gaga'ifomauga No. 2 | Malaitai Magasiva | |
| Gaga'ifomauga No. 3 | Tauaanae Fatu | |
| Individual Voters | George Lober | |
| Individual Voters | Ron Berking | Berking was murdered in 1980. Jack Netzler won the subsequent by-election |
| Lefaga & Falease'ela | Le Mamea Ropati | |
| Lepa | Fatialofa Momo'e | Momo'e died in 1980. The subsequent by-election was won by Tuilaepa Aiono Sailele Malielegaoi |
| Lotofaga | Laulu Fetauimalemau Mata'afa | |
| Palauli East | Autagavaia Tisena | |
| Palauli-le-Falefa | Le Tagaloa Pita | Result annulled in May 1979 due to bribery; Pita lost the subsequent by-election to Mapuilesua Pelenato |
| Palauli West | Vaovasamanaia Filipo | |
| Safata | Muliagatele Vena | Result annulled in May 1979 due to bribery; Vena lost the subsequent by-election to Tuiloma Pule Lameko |
| Sagaga-le-Falefa | Aiono Nonumalo Sofara | |
| Sagaga-le-Usoga | Taliaoa Maoama | |
| Salega | Leilua Manuao | |
| Satupa'itea | Asiata Solomona | |
| Siumu | Tuuu Faletoese | |
| Va'a-o-Fonoti | Ulualofaiga Talamaivao Niko | |
| Vaimauga East | Fuataga Laulu | |
| Vaimauga West | Tofaeono Tile | |
| Vaimauga West | Toomalatai Siaki | |
| Vaisigano No. 1 | Va'ai Kolone | |
| Vaisigano No. 2 | Lesatele Rapi | Rapi died in 1979. The subsequent by-election was won by Matautia Fanolua |
Source: Samoa Election Results Database
