= List of members of the Legislative Assembly of Western Samoa (1991–1996) =

Members of the Legislative Assembly of Western Samoa were elected on 5 April 1991. The 47 members consisted of 45 Samoans elected in one or two-member constituency and two 'individual voters' elected from a nationwide constituency.

== List of members ==
Constituency	Member	Notes
A'ana Alofi No. 1	Tole'afoa Fa'afisi	
A'ana Alofi No. 1	Matatumua Maimoana	
A'ana Alofi No. 2	Amiatu Sio	
A'ana Alofi No. 3	Afamasaga Fatu Va'ili	
Aiga-i-le-Tai	Leiataua Vaiao	
Alataua West	Ali'imalemanu Sasa	
Aleipata Itupa-i-Lalo	Letiu Tamatoa	
Aleipata Itupa-i-Luga	Fuataga Ioane Alama	Replaced by Toomalatai Lauvai II in 1995
Anoamaa East	Moananu Salale	Replaced by Tufuga Efi in 1991
Anoamaa West	Leota Leuluaiali'i Ituau Ale	
Fa'asaleleaga No. 1	Tofilau Eti Alesana	
Fa'asaleleaga No. 1	Tofilau Tauvaga	
Fa'asaleleaga No. 2	Pa'u Sale'aula Faleatua	
Fa'asaleleaga No. 3	Unasa Mesi Galo	
Fa'asaleleaga No. 4	Vui Viliamu	
Falealili	Fuimaono Lotomau	
Falealili	Fuimaono Mimio	
Falealupo	Mafasolia Papu Vailupe	
Faleata East	Matai'a Visesio	
Faleata West	Toi Aukuso Cain	
Falelatai & Samatau	Misa Telefoni Retzlaff	
Gaga'emauga No. 1	Sala Vaimili Uili II	
Gaga'emauga No. 2	Fa'aso'otauloa Pati	
Gaga'emauga No. 3	Leota Lu II	
Gaga'ifomauga No. 1	Ga'ina Tino	
Gaga'ifomauga No. 2	Sifuiva Sione	
Gaga'ifomauga No. 3	Polataivao Fosi	
Individual Voters	Jack Netzler	
Individual Voters	Hans Joachim Keil III	
Lefaga & Falease'ela	Le Mamea Ropati	
Lepa	Tuilaepa Aiono Sailele Malielegaoi	
Lotofaga	Fiame Naomi Mata'afa	
Palauli East	Leleisi'uao Palemene	
Palauli-le-Falefa	Le Tagaloa Pita	
Palauli West	Tamala Uilisone	
Safata	Tuiloma Pule Lameko	Replaced by Lesa Farani Posala Manua in 1993 and Palusalue Fa’apo II in 1994
Sagaga-le-Falefa	Aiono Nonumalo Sofara	
Sagaga-le-Usoga	Le'afa Vitale	
Salega	Leilua Manuao	Replaced by To'omata Leota Ropati in 1993
Satupa'itea	Tuimaseve Fuea	
Siumu	Tupuola Sola Siaosi	
Va'a-o-Fonoti	Ulualofaiga Talamaivao Niko	
Vaimauga East	Lenui Avamagalo	
Vaimauga West	Patu Afa'ese	
Vaimauga West	Samau Timani	
Vaisigano No. 1	Va'ai Kolone	Replaced by Masoe Filisi in 1993
Vaisigano No. 2	Seve Ropati	
Source: Samoa Election Results Database
