= List of members of the Legislative Assembly of Western Samoa (1985–1988) =

Members of the Legislative Assembly of Western Samoa were elected on 22 February 1985. The 47 members consisted of 45 Samoans elected in one or two-member constituency and two 'individual voters' elected from a nationwide constituency.

== List of members ==
Constituency	Member	Notes
A'ana Alofi No. 1	Aiono Fanaafi Le Tagaloa	
A'ana Alofi No. 1	Leaupepetele Taoipu	
A'ana Alofi No. 2	Tufuga Efi	
A'ana Alofi No. 3	Toeolesulusulu Si'ueva	
Aiga-i-le-Tai	Sa'u Lo'ivao	
Alataua West	Nonumalo Faiga	
Aleipata Itupa-i-Lalo	Tafua Kalolo	
Aleipata Itupa-i-Luga	Taua Latu Lome	
Anoamaa East	Savea Sione	Replaced by Faamatuainu Tala Mailei in 1985
Anoamaa West	Lauofo Meti	
Fa'asaleleaga No. 1	Tofilau Eti Alesana	
Fa'asaleleaga No. 1	Matautia Sa'e	
Fa'asaleleaga No. 2	Asi Eikeni	
Fa'asaleleaga No. 3	Tea Tooala Peato	
Fa'asaleleaga No. 4	Vailolo Filipo	
Falealili	Leilua Punivaluvalu	
Falealili	Fuimaono Mimio	
Falealupo	A'eau Peniamina	
Faleata East	Faumuina Anapapa	
Faleata West	Toi Aukuso Cain	
Falelatai & Samatau	Lupematasila Fa'amalaga	
Gaga'emauga No. 1	Auali'itia Pinati	
Gaga'emauga No. 2	Fa'aso'otauloa Pualagi	
Gaga'emauga No. 3	Seuamuli Kurene	
Gaga'ifomauga No. 1	Timu Lafaele	
Gaga'ifomauga No. 2	Sifuiva Sione	
Gaga'ifomauga No. 3	Polataivao Fosi	
Individual Voters	Jack Netzler	
Individual Voters	George Lober	
Lefaga & Falease'ela	Le Mamea Ropati	
Lepa	Tuilaepa Aiono Sailele Malielegaoi	
Lotofaga	Fiame Naomi Mata'afa	
Palauli East	Aiolupotea Palemene	
Palauli-le-Falefa	Le Tagaloa Pita	
Palauli West	Mulipola Fiatau	
Safata	Tuiloma Pule Lameko	
Sagaga-le-Falefa	Aiono Nonumalo Sofara	
Sagaga-le-Usoga	Taliaoa Maoama	
Salega	Fepuleai Semi	
Satupa'itea	Tavu'i Koki	
Siumu	Li'o Tusiofo	
Va'a-o-Fonoti	Atiifale Fiso	
Vaimauga East	Fuataga La'ulu	
Vaimauga West	Patu Afa'ese	
Vaimauga West	Asi Sagaga Faamatala	
Vaisigano No. 1	Va'ai Kolone	
Vaisigano No. 2	Lefua Lea'ana	
Source: Samoa Election Results Database
