= List of members of the Legislative Assembly of Western Samoa (1973–1976) =

Members of the Legislative Assembly of Western Samoa were elected on 24 February 1973. The 47 members consisted of 45 Samoans elected in one or two-member constituency and two 'individual voters' elected from a nationwide constituency.

== List of members ==
Constituency	Member	Notes
A'ana Alofi No. 1	Faimaala Filipo	
A'ana Alofi No. 1	Leaupepe Pita	
A'ana Alofi No. 2	Tufuga Efi	
A'ana Alofi No. 3	Sila Siaosi	
Aiga-i-le-Tai	Leva'a Fofoa	
Alataua West	Aliimalemanu Sakalia	
Aleipata Itupa-i-Lalo	Tafua Kalolo	
Aleipata Itupa-i-Luga	Fuataga Penita	
Anoamaa East	Tupua Tamasese	
Anoamaa West	Lauofo Meti	
Fa'asaleleaga No. 1	Lilomaiava Niko	
Fa'asaleleaga No. 1	Muagututi'a Lavilavi	
Fa'asaleleaga No. 2	Asi Eikeni	
Fa'asaleleaga No. 3	Toleafoa Talitimu	
Fa'asaleleaga No. 4	Vui Pipo	
Falealili	Fuimaono Mimio	
Falealili	Te'o Fetu	
Falealupo	A'e'au Taulupoo	
Faleata East	Faumuina Anapapa	
Faleata West	Ulugia Nofoa'iga	
Falelatai & Samatau	Aumua Ioane	
Gaga'emauga No. 1	Muagututi'a Pinati	
Gaga'emauga No. 2	Fepulea'i Samuelu	
Gaga'emauga No. 3	Tiatia Sauso'o	
Gaga'ifomauga No. 1	Tiapili Filisi	
Gaga'ifomauga No. 2	Le'aumoana Fereti	
Gaga'ifomauga No. 3	Polataivao Fosi	
Individual Voters	Alfonso Philipp	
Individual Voters	Sam Saili	
Lefaga & Falease'ela	Vaafusuaga Poutoa	
Lepa	Fatialofa Momo'e	
Lotofaga	Fiame Mata'afa	Mata'afa died in 1975. His wife Laulu Fetauimalemau won the resulting by-election.
Palauli East	Toluono Lama	
Palauli-le-Falefa	Le Tagaloa Pita	Seat originally won by Mapuilesua Malo, but Pita was declared the winner after a recount was ordered.
Palauli West	Vaovasamanaia Filipo	
Safata	Toeta Siui	
Sagaga-le-Falefa	Luatuanu'u Aitaua	
Sagaga-le-Usoga	Seiuli Taulafo	
Salega	Tapua'i Ene	
Satupa'itea	Asiata Iakopo	
Siumu	Mano Togamau	
Va'a-o-Fonoti	Laumea Matolu II	
Vaimauga East	Tuliaupupu Faafulu	
Vaimauga West	Toomalatai Siaki II	
Vaimauga West	Tofaeono Laaulupona	Laaulupona died later in 1973. He was replaced by Tofaeono Tile Imo.
Vaisigano No. 1	Va'ai Kolone	
Vaisigano No. 2	Lesatele Rapi	
Source: Samoa Election Results Database
