= List of members of the Legislative Assembly of Samoa (1996–2001) =

Members of the Legislative Assembly of Samoa were elected on 26 April 1996. The 49 members consisted of 47 Samoans elected in one or two-member constituency and two 'individual voters' elected from a nationwide constituency.

== List of members ==
Constituency	Member	Notes
A'ana Alofi No. 1	Tole'afoa Fa'afisi	
A'ana Alofi No. 1	Suafo'a Lautasi	
A'ana Alofi No. 2	Tolofuaivalelei Falemoe Lei’ataua	Replaced by Muagututia Samuelu in 1996
A'ana Alofi No. 3	To'alepaiali'i Si'ueva Pose III	Replaced by Afamasaga Faamatala in 1996
Aiga-i-le-Tai	Togia Taloa	
Alataua West	Ali'imalemanu Sasa	Replaced by Tuaiaufai Tafuaupolu in 1998 and Aliimalemanu Faale in 1999
Aleipata Itupa-i-Lalo	Su'a Atonio Lemi	
Aleipata Itupa-i-Luga	Taua Kitiona Seuala	
Anoamaa East	Tufuga Efi	
Anoamaa West	Tuala Tagaloa Sale Kerslake	
Fa'asaleleaga No. 1	Tofilau Eti Alesana	Replaced by Seumanu Aita Ah Wa in 1999
Fa'asaleleaga No. 1	Fiu Loimata II	
Fa'asaleleaga No. 2	Leanapapa Laki	
Fa'asaleleaga No. 3	Tea Tooala Peato	
Fa'asaleleaga No. 4	Mulitalo Siafausa	
Falealili	Fuimaono Esera Rimoni	
Falealili	Fuimaono Mimio	
Falealupo	Mafasolia Papu Vailupe	
Faleata East	Matai'a Visesio	Replaced by Patauave Etuale in 1998
Faleata West	Toi Aukuso Cain	Replaced by Ulu Vaomalo Kini in 2000
Falelatai & Samatau	Misa Telefoni Retzlaff	
Gaga'emauga No. 1	Tuala Falenaoti Tiresa	
Gaga'emauga No. 2	Fa'aso'otauloa Pati	
Gaga'emauga No. 3	Leota Lu II	
Gaga'ifomauga No. 1	Ga'ina Tino	
Gaga'ifomauga No. 2	Feo Nemaia Esau	
Gaga'ifomauga No. 3	Polataivao Fosi	
Individual Voters	Jack Netzler	
Individual Voters	Hans Joachim Keil III	
Lefaga & Falease'ela	Le Mamea Ropati	
Lepa	Tuilaepa Aiono Sailele Malielegaoi	
Lotofaga	Fiame Naomi Mata'afa	
Palauli East	Leituala Tone Tu'uaga	
Palauli-le-Falefa	Le Tagaloa Pita	
Palauli West	Lealaitafea Tau'ave	
Safata	Leotasu'atele Manusegi	
Safata	Palusalue Fa’apo II	
Sagaga-le-Falefa	Leatufale Roy Brunt	
Sagaga-le-Usoga	Le'afa Vitale	Replaced by Muagututagata Peter Ah Him in 2000
Salega	Luagalau Levaula Kamu	
Salega	Leilua Manuao	
Satupa'itea	Tavu'i Lene	Replaced by Gafa Ioelu Elisaia
Siumu	Tofaeono Anufesaina	Replaced by Tuu'u Anasi'i Leota in 1996
Va'a-o-Fonoti	Molio'o Teofilo	
Vaimauga East	Lenui Avamagalo	
Vaimauga West	Patu Afa'ese	
Vaimauga West	Matatauali'itia Afa Lesa	
Vaisigano No. 1	Va'ai Kolone	
Vaisigano No. 2	Togamaga Tafito	
Source: Samoa Election Results Database
