= List of members of the Legislative Assembly of Western Samoa (1988–1991) =

Members of the Legislative Assembly of Western Samoa were elected on 26 February 1988. The 47 members consisted of 45 Samoans elected in one or two-member constituency and two 'individual voters' elected from a nationwide constituency.

== List of members ==
Constituency	Member	Notes
A'ana Alofi No. 1	Leaupepe Uili	
A'ana Alofi No. 1	Tau'auve'a Peseta Moli	
A'ana Alofi No. 2	Alipia Siaosi	
A'ana Alofi No. 3	Afamasaga Fatu Va'ili	
Aiga-i-le-Tai	Leiataua Vaiao	
Alataua West	Nonumalo Faiga	
Aleipata Itupa-i-Lalo	Letiu Tamatoa	
Aleipata Itupa-i-Luga	Sagapolutele Sipaia	
Anoamaa East	Tufuga Efi	
Anoamaa West	Leota Leuluaiali'i Ituau Ale	
Fa'asaleleaga No. 1	Tofilau Eti Alesana	
Fa'asaleleaga No. 1	To'omata Afesulu	
Fa'asaleleaga No. 2	Tuilagi Vavae	
Fa'asaleleaga No. 3	Unasa Lio	
Fa'asaleleaga No. 4	Vailolo Filipo	
Falealili	Fuimaono Mimio	
Falealili	Fuimaono Lotomau	
Falealupo	A'eau Peniamina	
Faleata East	Faumuina Anapapa	
Faleata West	Toi Aukuso Cain	
Falelatai & Samatau	Misa Telefoni Retzlaff	
Gaga'emauga No. 1	Auali'itia Pinati	
Gaga'emauga No. 2	Fa'aso'otauloa Pualagi	
Gaga'emauga No. 3	Leota Lu II	
Gaga'ifomauga No. 1	Timu Lafaele	
Gaga'ifomauga No. 2	Sifuiva Sione	
Gaga'ifomauga No. 3	Polataivao Fosi	
Individual Voters	Jack Netzler	
Individual Voters	Hans Joachim Keil III	
Lefaga & Falease'ela	Le Mamea Ropati	Replaced by Tuaopepe Fili in 1988
Lepa	Tuilaepa Aiono Sailele Malielegaoi	
Lotofaga	Fata Siaosi	Replaced by Fiame Naomi Mata'afa in 1988
Palauli East	Leleisi'uao Palemene	
Palauli-le-Falefa	Le Tagaloa Pita	
Palauli West	Tauialo Lanu Palepoi	
Safata	Tuiloma Pule Lameko	
Sagaga-le-Falefa	Sapa'u Lolesio	
Sagaga-le-Usoga	Le'afa Vitale	
Salega	Leilua Manuao	
Satupa'itea	Tuimaseve Fuea	
Siumu	Tupuola Sola Siaosi	
Va'a-o-Fonoti	Ulualofaiga Talamaivao Niko	
Vaimauga East	Tafa'ese Uili	
Vaimauga West	Patu Afa'ese	
Vaimauga West	Asi Sagaga Faamatala	
Vaisigano No. 1	Va'ai Kolone	
Vaisigano No. 2	Seve Ropati	
Source: Samoa Election Results Database
