= Prime Minister of Samoa =

Head of government

Prime Minister of the Independent State of Samoa
- Palemia o le Malo Saʻoloto Tutoʻatasi o Sāmoa
- Coat of arms of Samoa

- Flag of Samoa

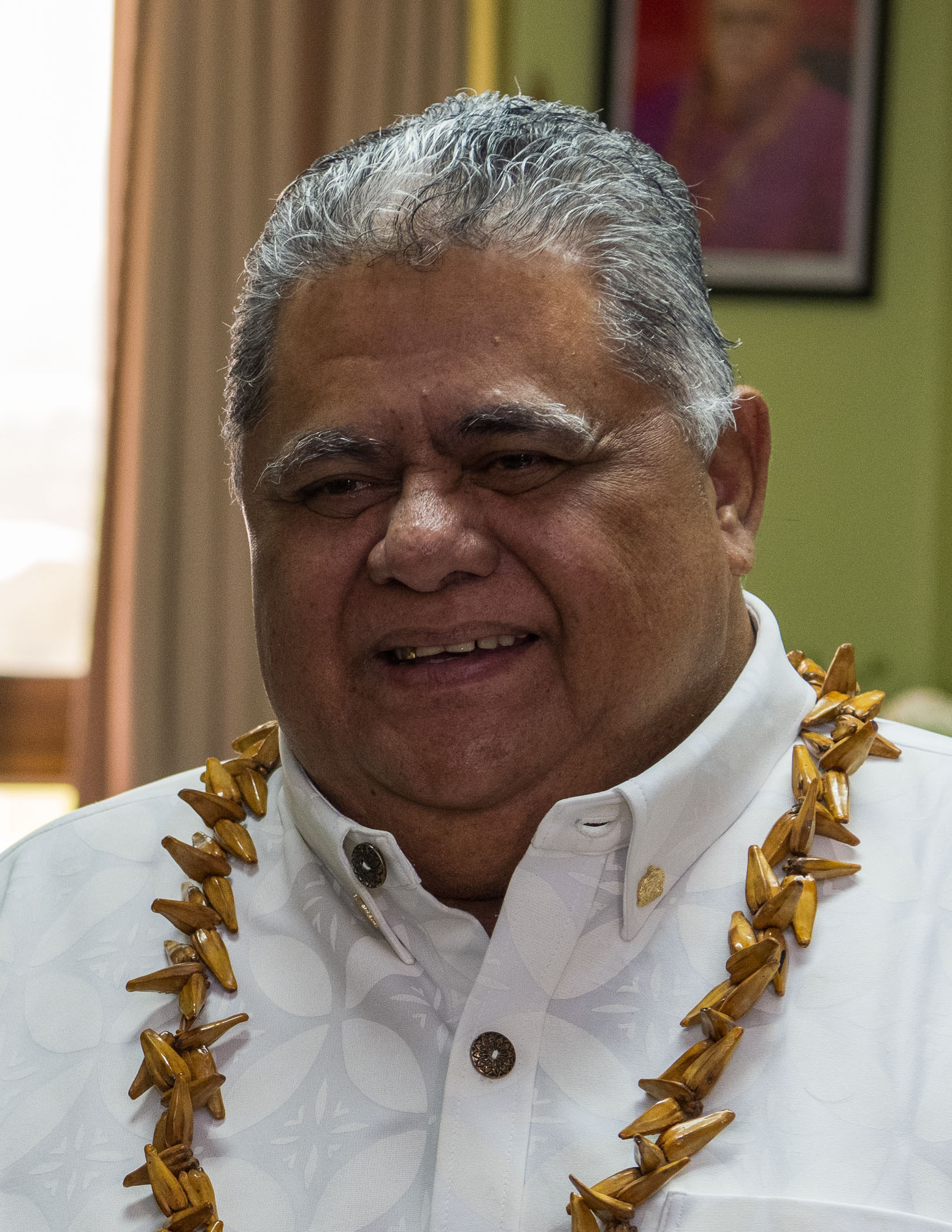
- Incumbent; Laʻauli Leuatea Schmidt since 16 September 2025
- Ministry of the Prime Minister and Cabinet
- Style: The Honourable
- Type: Head of government
- Abbreviation: PM
- Member of: Legislative Assembly; Cabinet of Samoa
- Seat: Apia
- Nominator: Political parties
- Appointer: O le Ao o le Malo
- Term length: Five years, renewable
- Constituting instrument: Constitution of Samoa
- Precursor: Leader of Government Business
- Inaugural holder: Fiamē Mataʻafa Faumuina Mulinuʻu II
- Formation: 1 October 1959; 67 years ago
- Deputy: Deputy Prime Minister of Samoa
- Salary: US$78,000 annually
- Website: www.samoagovt.ws

The prime minister of the Independent State of Samoa (Samoan: Palemia o le Malo Tuto’atasi o Sāmoa) is the head of government of Samoa. The prime minister is a member of the Legislative Assembly, and is appointed by the O le Ao o le Malo (Head of State) for a five-year term. Since independence in 1962, a total of eight individuals have served as prime minister. The incumbent prime minister is Laʻauli Leuatea Schmidt, who assumed office on 16 September 2025. Schmidt also leads the Faʻatuatua i le Atua Samoa ua Tasi (FAST) party.

== History of the office ==
=== Colonial period ===
The first prime minister during the colonial period was Albert Barnes Steinberger, who originally represented the American government in the Samoan Islands but was close to German commercial interests. After the indigenous authorities of the islands adopted the Constitution of 1873, Steinberger was appointed prime minister by King Malietoa Laupepa in July 1875. He held this post for seven months before the British and American consuls in the country persuaded Laupepa to dismiss him, seeing his role as German interference in the islands. Over the next two decades, there was no prime minister in the country, and in 1899 Samoa fell under the colonial rule of the Western powers, being divided as a German colony and an American colony at the end of the Second Samoan Civil War, according to the terms of the Tripartite Convention.

At the beginning of the World War I, German Samoa was occupied by New Zealand in 1914, and was subsequently organized as a trust territory of New Zealand in 1920.

=== Post-independence period ===
The position of prime minister replaced the office of the leader of government business in 1959, whilst the country was a territory of New Zealand. High chief Fiamē Mataʻafa Faumuina Mulinuʻu II became Samoa’s first prime minister on 1 October 1959.

After Samoa (then known as Western Samoa) gained independence on 1 January 1962, the prime minister's office remained intact, and the premiership of Fiamē Mataʻafa continued. The head of state, or O le Ao o le Malo (initially held by two individuals), was established as a ceremonial office. In 1991, the legislative assembly passed a bill proposed by Prime Minister Tofilau Eti Alesana's Human Rights Protection Party (HRPP) to increase the parliamentary term (and hence the premiership) from three to five years. Which therefore extended the time a prime minister can serve without renewing their mandate.

From 24 May to 23 July 2021, the premiership was in dispute due to an inconclusive result from the 2021 general election and the subsequent constitutional crisis. The claimants were long-serving prime minister Tuilaʻepa Saʻilele Malielegaoi of the HRPP, and Fiamē Naomi Mataʻafa of the Faʻatuatua i le Atua Samoa ua Tasi (FAST) party, a former deputy prime minister and daughter of Fiamē Mataʻafa Faumuina Mulinuʻu II. On 23 July, the Supreme Court ruled that Fiamē Naomi's FAST government was legitimate since 24 May. Tuilaʻepa conceded defeat on 26 July and ceded power the following day, resulting in Fiamē Naomi Mataʻafa becoming Samoa's first female prime minister and ending nearly 40 years of HRPP rule.

== Powers and appointment ==
The Constitution, adopted in 1960 during the transitional period of autonomy, provides that the executive power is vested in the head of state (O le Ao o le Malo), elected by the Legislative Assembly, and who acts only on the recommendation of the government. The head of state has royal assent powers to sign bills into law and dissolve Parliament. Executive power is exercised by the prime minister and their cabinet. The prime minister is appointed by the head of state as a member of the Legislative Assembly who enjoys the confidence of a majority in the Legislative Assembly (Article 32 (2) (a)). The prime minister may be removed from office by the Legislative Assembly (Article 33 (1) (b)). Samoa is thus a parliamentary democracy based on the Westminster system.

== List of officeholders ==
Political parties

Human Rights Protection Party (HRPP)
Faʻatuatua i le Atua Samoa ua Tasi (FAST)
Samoa Uniting Party (SUP)

Other factions

Independent

Status

Denotes acting prime minister

=== Prime Minister of the Kingdom of Samoa (1875–1876) ===
No.	Portrait	Name (Birth–Death)	Term of office			Political party	Monarch(s)	Ref.
No.	Portrait	Name (Birth–Death)	Took office	Left office	Time in office	Political party	Monarch(s)	Ref.
1		Albert Barnes Steinberger (1840–1894)	22 May 1875	8 February 1876	262 days	Independent	Laupepa	
Post abolished (8 February 1876 – 1 October 1959)

=== Prime Ministers of the Independent State of Samoa (1959–present) ===
No.	Portrait	Name (Birth–Death)	Term of office			Political party	Elected (Parliament)	Cabinet(s)	Head(s) of State	Ref.
No.	Portrait	Name (Birth–Death)	Took office	Left office	Time in office	Political party	Elected (Parliament)	Cabinet(s)	Head(s) of State	Ref.
1		Fiamē Mataʻafa Faumuina Mulinuʻu II (1921–1975)	1 October 1959	25 February 1970	10 years, 147 days	Independent	—		Meaʻole & Tanumafili II	
1		Fiamē Mataʻafa Faumuina Mulinuʻu II (1921–1975)	1 October 1959	25 February 1970	10 years, 147 days	Independent	1961 (1st)	I	Meaʻole & Tanumafili II	
1		Fiamē Mataʻafa Faumuina Mulinuʻu II (1921–1975)	1 October 1959	25 February 1970	10 years, 147 days	Independent	1964 (2nd)	II	Tanumafili II	
1		Fiamē Mataʻafa Faumuina Mulinuʻu II (1921–1975)	1 October 1959	25 February 1970	10 years, 147 days	Independent	1967 (3rd)	III	Tanumafili II	
2		Tupua Tamasese Lealofi IV (1922–1983)	25 February 1970	20 March 1973	3 years, 23 days	Independent	1970 (4th)	IV	Tanumafili II	
(1)		Fiamē Mataʻafa Faumuina Mulinuʻu II (1921–1975)	20 March 1973	20 May 1975 #	2 years, 61 days	Independent	1973 (5th)	V	Tanumafili II	
—		Tupua Tamasese Lealofi IV (1922–1983) acting	21 May 1975	24 March 1976	308 days	Independent	— (5th)	V	Tanumafili II	
3		Tupuola Efi (born 1938)	24 March 1976	13 April 1982	6 years, 20 days	Independent	1976 (6th)	VI	Tanumafili II	
3		Tupuola Efi (born 1938)	24 March 1976	13 April 1982	6 years, 20 days	Independent	1979 (7th)	VII	Tanumafili II	
4		Vaʻai Kolone (1911–2001)	13 April 1982	18 September 1982	158 days	HRPP	1982 (8th)	VII	Tanumafili II	
(3)		Tupuola Efi (born 1938)	18 September 1982	31 December 1982	104 days	Independent	— (8th)	VIII	Tanumafili II	
5		Tofilau Eti Alesana (1924–1999)	31 December 1982	30 December 1985	2 years, 364 days	HRPP	— (8th)	VIII	Tanumafili II	
5		Tofilau Eti Alesana (1924–1999)	31 December 1982	30 December 1985	2 years, 364 days	HRPP	1985 (9th)	IX	Tanumafili II	
(4)		Vaʻai Kolone (1911–2001)	30 December 1985	8 April 1988	2 years, 100 days	HRPP	— (9th)	IX	Tanumafili II	
(4)		Vaʻai Kolone (1911–2001)	30 December 1985	8 April 1988	2 years, 100 days	HRPP	1988 (10th)	X	Tanumafili II	
(5)		Tofilau Eti Alesana (1924–1999)	8 April 1988	23 November 1998	10 years, 229 days	HRPP	— (10th)	X	Tanumafili II	
(5)		Tofilau Eti Alesana (1924–1999)	8 April 1988	23 November 1998	10 years, 229 days	HRPP	1991 (11th)	XI	Tanumafili II	
(5)		Tofilau Eti Alesana (1924–1999)	8 April 1988	23 November 1998	10 years, 229 days	HRPP	1996 (12th)	XII	Tanumafili II	
6		Tuilaʻepa Saʻilele Malielegaoi (born 1944)	23 November 1998	24 May 2021	22 years, 182 days	HRPP	— (12th)	XII	Tanumafili II	
6		Tuilaʻepa Saʻilele Malielegaoi (born 1944)	23 November 1998	24 May 2021	22 years, 182 days	HRPP	2001 (13th)	XIII	Tanumafili II	
6		Tuilaʻepa Saʻilele Malielegaoi (born 1944)	23 November 1998	24 May 2021	22 years, 182 days	HRPP	2006 (14th)	XIV	Tanumafili II	
6		Tuilaʻepa Saʻilele Malielegaoi (born 1944)	23 November 1998	24 May 2021	22 years, 182 days	HRPP	2011 (15th)	XV	Tupua Tamasese Efi	
6		Tuilaʻepa Saʻilele Malielegaoi (born 1944)	23 November 1998	24 May 2021	22 years, 182 days	HRPP	2016 (16th)	XVI	Tupua Tamasese Efi	
7		Fiamē Naomi Mataʻafa (Note: Disputed: 24 May 2021 — 23 July 2021.) (born 1957)	24 May 2021	16 September 2025	4 years, 115 days	FAST (until 2025)	2021 (17th)	XVII	Vaʻaletoʻa Sualauvi II	
7		Fiamē Naomi Mataʻafa (born 1957)	24 May 2021	16 September 2025	4 years, 115 days	SUP	2021 (17th)	XVII	Vaʻaletoʻa Sualauvi II	
8		Laʻauli Leuatea Schmidt (born 1966)	16 September 2025	Incumbent	1 year, 35 days	FAST	2025 (18th)	XVIII	Vaʻaletoʻa Sualauvi II	

== See also ==
- Samoa
  - Politics of Samoa
  - List of colonial governors of Samoa
  - O le Ao o le Malo
  - Deputy Prime Minister of Samoa
- Lists of office-holders
