= List of members of the Legislative Assembly of Samoa (2001–2006) =

Members of Samoan Legislative Assembly in 2001

Members of the Legislative Assembly of Samoa were elected on 2 March 2001. The 49 members consisted of 47 Samoans elected in one or two-member constituency and two 'individual voters' elected from a nationwide constituency.

== List of members ==
Constituency	Member	Notes
A'ana Alofi No. 1	Toleafoa Apulu Fa'afisi	
A'ana Alofi No. 1	Apule Pepe Metai	Replaced by Aiono Tile Gafa in 2004
A'ana Alofi No. 2	Tolofuaivalelei Falemoe Lei’atau	
A'ana Alofi No. 3	Fagafagamanuali'i Therese	
Aiga-i-le-Tai	Leva'a Sauaso	
Alataua West	Nonumalo Faiga	Replaced by Ta'atiti Alofa in 2002 and Tuaiaufai Latu in 2003
Aleipata Itupa-i-Lalo	Su'a Atonio Lemi	
Aleipata Itupa-i-Luga	Taua Kitiona Seuala	
Anoamaa East	Tufuga Efi	Replaced by Moefaauo Lufilufi in 2005
Anoamaa West	Tuala Tagaloa Sale Kerslake	Replaced by Fonotoe Pierre Lauofo in 2005
Fa'asaleleaga No. 1	Tofilau Tauvaga	
Fa'asaleleaga No. 1	Seumanu Aita Ah Wa	Replaced by Tiata Sili Pulufana in 2004
Fa'asaleleaga No. 2	Letoa Sefo Pa'u Taumata	Replaced by Leanapapa Laki in 2001
Fa'asaleleaga No. 3	Unasa Mesi Galo	
Fa'asaleleaga No. 4	Mulitalo Siafausa Vui	
Falealili	Fuimaono Mimio	
Falealili	Tuiloma Lameko	
Falealupo	A'eau Peniamina	
Faleata East		Replaced by Lepou Petelo II in 2002
Faleata West	Ulu Vaomalo Kini	
Falelatai & Samatau	Misa Telefoni Retzlaff	
Gaga'emauga No. 1	Tuala Ainiu Iusitino	
Gaga'emauga No. 2	Fa'aso'otauloa Pati	
Gaga'emauga No. 3	Leota Lu II	
Gaga'ifomauga No. 1	Ga'ina Tino	
Gaga'ifomauga No. 2	Safuneitu'uga Pa'aga Neri	
Gaga'ifomauga No. 3	Vagana Pelei'upu Tamate	
Individual Voters	Hans Joachim Keil III	
Individual Voters	Chan Chui Van Sung	Replaced by Niko Lee Hang in 2001
Lefaga & Falease'ela	Le Mamea Ropati	
Lepa	Tuilaepa Aiono Sailele Malielegaoi	
Lotofaga	Fiame Naomi Mata'afa	
Palauli East	Leituala Tone Tu'uaga	Replaced by Autagavaia Lave in 2001
Palauli-le-Falefa	Faumuina Tiatia Liuga	
Palauli West	Tamala Uilisone	
Safata		
Sagaga-le-Falefa	Patea Satini Epati	
Sagaga-le-Usoga	Maulolo Tavita Amosa	Replaced by Taliaoa Pita in 2001
Salega	Tapua'i To'ese	
Salega	Leilua Manuao	
Satupa'itea	Asiata Sale'imoa Va'ai	
Siumu	Tuu'u Anasi'i Leota	
Va'a-o-Fonoti	Leao Talalelei	
Vaimauga East	Tuisugaletaua Sofara Aveau	
Vaimauga West	Sililoto Tolo	
Vaimauga West	Ativalu Togi II Patu	
Vaisigano No. 1	Masoe Filisi	
Vaisigano No. 2	Valasi Tafito	
Source: Samoa Election Results Database
