= Leota Leuluaiali'i Ituau Ale =

Samoan politician

Speaker of the Legislative Assembly
- In office 1976–1979
- Preceded by: Toleafoa Talitimu
- Succeeded by: Tuuu Faletoese

Member of the Legislative Assembly
- In office 1988–1996
- Preceded by: Lauofo Meti
- Succeeded by: Tuala Tagaloa Sale Kerslake
- In office 1976–1981
- Preceded by: Lauofo Meti
- Succeeded by: Lauofo Meti
- In office 1970–1973
- Preceded by: Leota To'omata Siaki
- Succeeded by: Lauofo Meti
- Constituency: Anoamaa West

Personal details
- Died: 27 April 2016

Leota Leuluaiali'i Ituau Ale (died 27 April 2016) was a Samoan politician. He was a member of the Legislative Assembly in three spells from 1970 to 1996 and served as Speaker from 1976 to 1979.

== Biography ==
Ale attended Toomua Primary School and Samoa College, before finishing his education at Whangarei Boys High School in New Zealand. He subsequently studied at the University of the South Pacific and earned a master's degree in history and political studies at the University of Auckland. He later taught at Samoa College and the Institute of Samoan Studies.

He entered the civil service as a foreign officer in the Prime Minister's Office, before becoming private secretary to prime ministers Fiame Mata'afa and Tupua Tamasese. He was also senior interpreter and translator for the Legislative Assembly, and the Supreme Court, Land and Titles Court and magistrate courts. He subsequently worked as manager of Christian Congregational Church of Samoa Museum in Malua.

In 1970 Ale was elected to the Legislative Assembly from the Anoamaa West constituency, defeating the incumbent MLA Leota To'omata Siaki. However, he lost his seat in the 1973 election, losing by one vote to Lauofo Meti. After regaining his seat in the 1976 elections, he was elected Speaker. He was re-elected in 1979 but lost the vote for the Speakership to Tuuu Faletoese by a margin of 24 votes to 23.

Following the elections, he was a founder member of the Human Rights Protection Party and its first deputy leader. However, unhappy at not becoming its leader, he left the party and supported the government of Tupuloa Efi. In July 1980 he was appointed as the country's senior commissioner at the South Pacific Commission. In September 1981 he was dismissed from the Legislative Assembly for having sexual relations and fathering a child with a woman other than his wife. He was subsequently jailed for perjury.

He was allowed to contest the 1982 elections, but was defeated by Lauofo Meti. After losing to Meti again in 1985, he was elected to the Legislative Assembly in 1988. He was later suspended from the Legislative Assembly for a year after failing to substantiate claims that the Prime Minister had stolen cutlery. He was re-elected in 1991 as a member of the Samoan National Development Party, but lost his seat when the Speaker A'eau Peniamina declared his seat vacant after he missed three consecutive sittings following a car accident. He attempted a comeback in the 2006 elections, but finished second to Fonotoe Pierre Lauofo.

In 2012 he was banished from his village of Solosolo following a dispute. He ran for election again in March 2016, again finishing second to Lauofo. Following the elections, he was allowed to return to his village after the Lands and Titles Court ordered the ban be rescinded. However, he died later the same month, and was given a state funeral.
