= Toluono Lama =

Samoan politician

Member of the Legislative Assembly
- In office 1973–1976
- Preceded by: Tupua Siliva
- Succeeded by: Lagaaia Faamaga
- Constituency: Palauli East

Personal details
- Died: February 1982; New Zealand

Toluono Lama (died February 1982) was a Western Samoan politician. He was a member of the Legislative Assembly from 1973 to 1976.

== Biography ==
During the colonial era, Lama was a member of the anti-colonial Mau movement. In 1950 he was appointed to the committee on local government by High Commissioner Guy Powles, and later served as a member of the Local Government Board. He was elected to the 1960 Constitutional Assembly that drew up the independence constitution, and was one of its signatories. Following independence, he became a judge in the Lands and Titles Court.

He contested the Palauli East seat in the 1970 elections, losing to Tupua Siliva. However, he was elected unopposed from the constituency in the 1973 elections. During the parliamentary term, he was an opponent of the government. He did not contest the 1976 elections, but subsequently became an advisor to new Prime Minister Tupuola Efi.

He died in New Zealand in February 1982 after travelling to the country for medical treatment.
