= 1979 Western Samoan general election =

General election held in Western Samoa

← 1976	24 February 1979	1982 →

All 47 seats in the Legislative Assembly
	First party
Party	Independents
Last election	47 seats
Seats won	47
Seat change	Steady
Prime Minister before election
Tupuola Efi
Independent
Subsequent Prime Minister
Tupuola Efi
Independent

General elections were held in Western Samoa on 24 February 1979. Voting was restricted to matai and citizens of European origin ("individual voters"), with the Matai electing 45 MPs and Europeans two. Although all candidates ran as independents, an opposition bloc had emerged following the 1976 election of Tupuola Efi as Prime Minister in Parliament.

== Background ==
Prior to the elections, around 1,500 matai had their titles removed by the registrar of the Land and Titles Court. However, after intervention of head of state Malietoa Tanumafili II, the titles were restored.

Around a week before the elections, the Department of the Prime Minister issued a statement stating that three MPs had been meeting with an American firm the government considered to be dishonest. The three MPs, Tofilau Eti Alesana, Fa'aso'otauloa Pualagi and Sala Suivai, later revealed themselves and claimed the issue was being used against them.

== Electoral system ==
Voters elected the 47 members of parliament through the first-past-the-post voting system. Thirty-seven constituencies were represented in the legislature by a single seat, whilst four elected two candidates with their constituents casting two votes. Individual voters, primarily residents of European, Chinese or partial Samoan descent (half-caste), selected members for the other two seats. Reserved for half-caste and non-ethnic Samoans, the individual voters' constituency was nationwide. Except for the non-ethnic Samoan seats, candidates were required to hold a matai title to be eligible to contest the election, whilst non-matai were not permitted to vote.

== Results ==
Of the 47 elected members, 26 were new to the Legislative Assembly. Incumbents losing their seats included Minister of Education Lilomaiava Niko. Alesana, Pualagi and Suivai were all re-elected.

Party	Votes	%	Seats
Independents	10,114	100.00	47
Total	10,114	100.00	47
Valid votes	10,114	99.07	
Invalid/blank votes	95	0.93	
Total ballots cast		–	
Registered voters/turnout	13,863	–	
Source: Nohlen et al.

== Aftermath ==
Although candidates who had pledged to elect Va'ai Kolone as Prime Minister won a majority of seats, Tupuola Efi was re-elected as prime minister on 28 March, defeating Kolone by 24 votes to 23. The same voting pattern occurred in the elections for Speaker and Deputy Speaker, with Tuuu Faletoese elected Speaker with 24 votes to the 23 received by Leota Ale and Aeau Taulupoo defeating Toleafoa Talitimu by the same margin for the deputy speakership. The opposition members formed the Human Rights Protection Party with Kolone as its leader.

Efi cabinet
Position	Minister
Prime Minister	Tupuola Efi
Minister of Agriculture	Seumanu Aita Ah Wa
Minister of Economic Development	Letiu Tamatoa
Minister of Education	Fuimaono Mimio
Minister of Finance	Vaovasamanaia Filipo
Minister of Health	Faumuina Anapapa
Minister of Justice	Asi Eikeni
Minister of Lands and Survey	Lesatele Rapi
Minister of Works	Seuamuli Kurene

In May Chief Justice Bryan Nicholson annulled the results in four constituencies due to bribery, with the four members – George Lober, Le Tagaloa Pita, Letiu Tamatoa (Minister of Economic Development) and Muliagatele Vena – losing their seats. Three of them (Lober, Tamatoa and) Vena were supporters of Efi. By-elections were held on 18 August, in which Lober and Tamatoa were re-elected, Vena lost his seat to Pule Lameko, but Pita was defeated by Efi supporter Mapuilesua Pelenato, giving Efi his 24–23 majority back. Following the loss of his majority, Efi avoided a potential vote of no confidence by not calling a parliamentary session until November.

== See also ==
- List of members of the Legislative Assembly of Western Samoa (1979–1982)
