= Fiaga Diesel Power Plant =

Power plant in Tuamasaga, Samoa

- Country: Samoa
- Location: Tuamasaga
- Coordinates: 13°53′06.6″S 171°53′04.8″W
- Status: Operational
- Commission date: 2013
- Owner: Samoa Electric Power Corporation

Thermal power station
- Primary fuel: Diesel fuel

Power generation
- Nameplate capacity: 23 MW
- Annual net output: 85 GWh

The Fiaga Diesel Power Plant is a fossil fuel power station in Tuamasaga, Samoa.

== History ==
The power station was commissioned in April 2013. In January 2020 the plant was damaged by lightning.

== Technical specifications ==
The power station has an installed capacity of 23 MW. It generates 85 GWh of electricity annually, which is 65% of the total load in the country.

== Finance ==
The power plant was financed by the Asian Development Bank, Japan International Cooperation Agency and the Government of Australia.
