= Su'a Aloese =

Samoan politician

Member of the Legislative Assembly
- In office 1967–1973
- Preceded by: Toleafoa Talitimu
- Succeeded by: Toleafoa Talitimu
- Constituency: Fa'asaleleaga No. 3

Personal details
- Died: January 1982 (aged 72) Apia, Western Samoa

Su'a Aloese (died January 1982) was a Western Samoan politician. He was a member of the Legislative Assembly from 1967 to 1973.

== Biography ==
Following his education at Malifa school, Aloese began working as a trader in 1932. In 1956 he became a civil servant, joining the Agriculture Department.

After leaving the civil service in 1966, he contested the Fa'asaleleaga No. 3 constituency in the 1967 elections, defeating incumbent MP Toleafoa Talitimu. After becoming an MP, he sat on the Bills Committee. He was re-elected in 1970, but lost to Talitimu in 1973. He contested the seat again in 1979, but finished fifth in a field of six candidates.

He died in January 1982 at the age of 72.
