= Christian Democratic Party (Samoa) =

Political party in Samoa

The Christian Democratic Party (CDP) was a political party in Samoa. The party was founded in February 1985 by the supporters of former Prime Minister Tupuola Taisi Tufuga Efi. At the 1985 election the party won only 15 of 47 seats, but was able to form a coalition government in December 1985 after 11 Human Rights Protection Party MPs crossed the floor to vote against the budget of then-Prime Minister Tofilau Eti Alesana. Va'ai Kolone became prime minister. While apparently retaining a majority after the 1988 election, the party lost power after the defection of Tanuvasa Livigisitone to the HRPP.

On April 8, 1988 the party merged with the Samoa National Party to form the Samoan National Development Party.
