= Lalomalava =

Village in Samoa

Coordinates: 13°42′06″S 172°12′03″W

Lalomalava is a village at the southeast end of Savai'i island in Samoa. The village is part of the electoral constituency (Faipule District) Fa'asaleleaga I which is within the larger political district (Itumalo) of Fa'asaleleaga. The population is 307 (2016 Census).

Former Prime Minister Tofilau Eti Alesana is buried in Lalomalava.
