= Tea Tooala Peato =

Samoan politician

Member of the Samoan Parliament for Fa'asalele'aga No. 4
- Incumbent
- Assumed office 9 April 2021
- Preceded by: Tofa Lio Foleni

Member of the Samoan Parliament for Fa'asalele'aga No. 3
- In office 26 April 1996 – 2 March 2001
- Preceded by: Unasa Mesi Galo
- Succeeded by: Unasa Mesi Galo
- In office 27 February 1982 – 26 February 1988
- Preceded by: Leulu Laifaga
- Succeeded by: Unasa Lio

Personal details
- Party: Faʻatuatua i le Atua Samoa ua Tasi (2021–present)
- Other political affiliations: Samoan National Development Party (1996–2001)

Tea Tooala Peato (born ~1940) is a Samoan politician.

== Biography ==
Peato is from Sa'asa'ai in the district of Faʻasaleleaga and has worked as a businessman. He was first elected to the Legislative Assembly of Samoa at the 1982 election. He was re-elected at the 1985 election but lost his seat in 1988. After taking a break from politics he ran again at the 1996 election and was elected for another term as a member of the Samoan National Development Party. He lost his seat again at the 2001 election, and subsequently spent several years working in a hardware store. He ran unsuccessfully at the 2016 election.

Peato contested the April 2021 election as a candidate for the Fa'atuatua i le Atua Samoa ua Tasi and was again elected to parliament according to preliminary results. On 28 July 2021 he was appointed Associate Minister of Health. On 17 January 2025 he was fired as an associate minister by prime minister Fiamē Naomi Mataʻafa after supporting her expulsion from the FAST party.
