= Albert Barnes Steinberger =

American trader and former prime minister of the Kingdom of Samoa

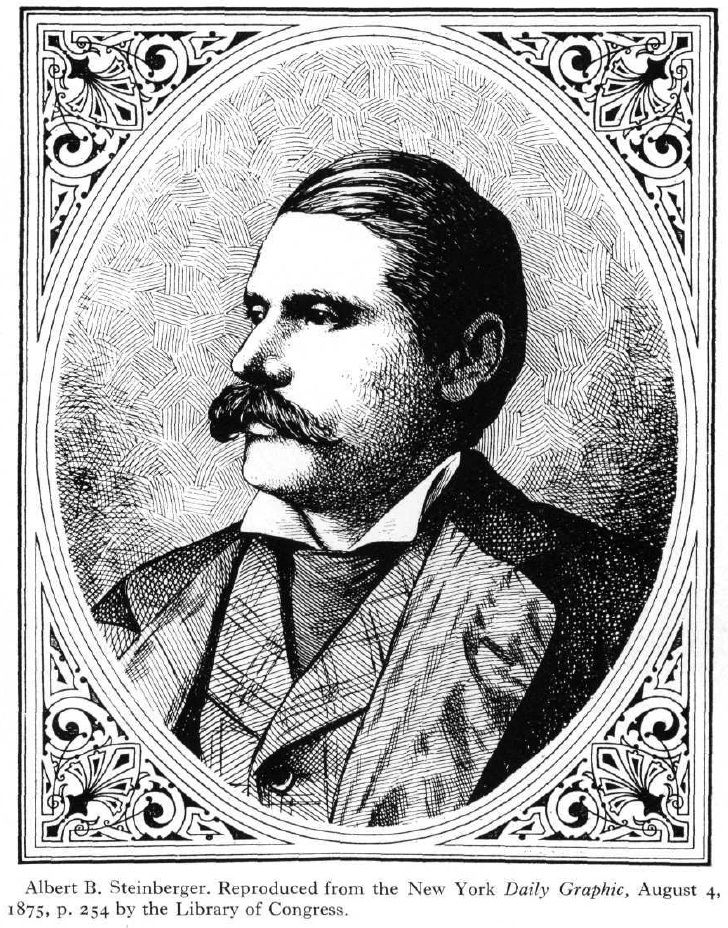
- Portrait of Albert Barnes Steinberger

Prime Minister of the Kingdom of Samoa
- In office 22 May 1875 – 8 February 1876
- Monarch: Malietoa Laupepa
- Preceded by: Office Established
- Succeeded by: Office Abolished

Travel State Minister of the Kingdom of Samoa
- In office 22 May 1876 – 8 February 1879
- Monarch: Malietoa Laupepa
- Preceded by: Office Established
- Succeeded by: Office Abolished

Personal details
- Born: 25 December 1841; Massachusetts
- Died: 1 May 1894 (aged 52); Massachusetts
- Political party: Independent

Colonel Albert Barnes Steinberger (25 December 1841 – 1 May 1894, Massachusetts), was an American agent who became the first Prime Minister of Samoa in 1875, in a context of colonial rivalries around the archipelago.

== Early life ==
His father was a medical doctor; he was the sixth of nine children, and grew up in Pennsylvania. At the age of 18, he moved to Colorado, where he briefly entered politics and wrote plays. In the early 1860s, he returned to the Eastern United States and lived in New York. He married in 1867, but his wife died four years later, after a long illness.

== Time in Samoa ==
=== Before his appointment as Prime Minister ===
In the early 1870s, Americans had commercial interests in the Samoan archipelago, which consisted of distinct and sometimes rival indigenous monarchies. British and German commercial interests were also present. A Samoan national government existed, consisting of two joint kings, and a bicameral assembly representing the different districts of the country. Malietoa Laupepa and Tupua Pulepule, from lineages of the traditional aristocracy, were the two kings. In 1873, United States President Ulysses S. Grant sent Steinberger as an emissary to Samoa, to represent him to the chiefs, and to report on the situation on the islands. Steinberger presented himself as a "colonel", but there is no evidence that he actually held such a rank, although he worked for a time in the US Army's treasury. He spent three months in Samoa, then went to Hamburg to negotiate with the Germans for the establishment of a Samoan government sensitive to American and German commercial interests. Returning to Samoa in 1874 on a US Navy ship, he managed to convene a large gathering of 8,000 chiefs, where a formal exchange of gifts between Samoans and Americans took place. Steinberger suggested to leaders the idea of an American protectorate on the archipelago, saying that it would preserve Samoan autonomy against any foreign power. However, he did not obtain the agreement of the US government for this proposal.

=== Time as Prime Minister ===
Steinberger became influential and popular with the Samoan authorities. As early as 1873, the government drafted a new constitution designed to promote stability favorable to the interests of foreign investors. Instead of a joint monarchy, the greatest chiefs would now alternate on the throne, Malietoa Laupepa exercising alone until his death the functions of king. The parliament is reorganized, now including a chamber of ali'i or nobles (chosen by the various districts of the country, and formally appointed members by the king) and a chamber of elected representatives. Each district had a governor, responsible to the king. On July 4, 1875, he was appointed by the king to the new position of prime minister at the age of thirty-four years. Overall, Samoans are satisfied with these measures, and the government led by Steinberger; as the guarantor of their political independence.

Soon, Steinberger exercised an almost absolute power in the archipelago. He displeased the minority of settlers by insisting that laws passed by the indigenous parliament apply to all residents of the country, as the parliament restricted the sale of alcohol. The American and British consuls in Samoa, S.S. Foster and S.F. Williams, suspect him of having become essentially an agent in the service of the Germans. Having obtained the assurance that the American government did not support Steinberger, the British and American consuls obtained from King Laupepa on February 8, 1876, that he dismissed his prime minister and ordered his deportation. He is deported to Fiji, British territory, and never returned to Samoa.

=== Repercussions of his dismissal as Prime Minister ===
His dismissal had important repercussions. For having acted on their own initiative, the American and British consuls were themselves sacked by their respective governments. The Samoan parliament, furious that the king thus yielded to foreign pressure, deposed Laupepa, without appointing another king immediately; nor was there a new prime minister to replace Steinberger. Laupepa then organized a rival government. During the next two decades, the country was marked by instability, especially as the British, Americans and Germans sometimes support different factions. These tensions eventually lead to the tripartite treaty of 1899. Samoa was then split between a German colony and an American colony (while Washington and Berlin sold islands to the British in other parts of the Pacific).

=== Controversies ===
The Samoan historian Malama Meleisea believed that Steinberger helped to consolidate a Samoan government in a difficult period (even if it was ultimately a failure), but that his secret agreements with German companies and planters made him a prime minister never fully devoted to the interests of the Samoans.

Government offices
New office	Prime Minister of the Kingdom of Samoa; 1875–1876	Office abolished
New office	Travel State Minister of the Kingdom of Samoa; 1876–1879	Office abolished
