= Lepou Petelo II =

Samoan politician (died 2021)

Member of the Samoa Parliament for Faleata East
- In office July 2002 – 31 March 2006
- Preceded by: Faumuina Anapapa
- Succeeded by: Manuleleua Lalagofaatasi Falaniko Leleua

Personal details
- Died: 16 April 2021
- Party: Human Rights Protection Party

Lepou Petelo II (died 16 April 2021) was a Samoan politician and former Member of the Legislative Assembly of Samoa. He was a member of the Human Rights Protection Party.

Petelo worked as a lab assistant at the University of the South Pacific in Samoa and as a construction foreman. He was elected to the Fono for the seat of Faleata East in July 2002 after his predecessor, Faumuina Anapapa, was appointed to the Council of Deputies. An arrangement between villages in the electorate saw him elected unopposed. According to the agreement, he was supposed to stand down at the 2006 election to make way for a candidate from Vaimoso village. When he contested the election, he was banished from his village. He subsequently lost the seat to Manuleleua Lalagofaatasi Falaniko Leleua. The Lands and Titles Court later ruled his banishment was illegal and excessive.

Petelo also contested the 2021 election.
