= Faimaala Filipo =

Samoan politician

Member of the Legislative Assembly
- In office 1970–1973
- Preceded by: Tuitolovaa Epati
- Succeeded by: Vaovasamanaia Filipo
- Constituency: Palauli West
- In office 1973–1976
- Constituency: A'ana Alofi No. 1

Personal details
- Born: 1932
- Died: 2014 (aged 81–82)

Leaupepe Taulapapa Faimaala Fuatino Vaovasamanaia Filipo (1932 – 2014) was a Samoan politician. She was the first female member of the Legislative Assembly of Samoa, the first woman to be elected Deputy Speaker, and the first female judge in the Land and Titles Court of Samoa.

== Biography ==
Born in 1932, Filipo attended school in Leififi, Samoa College and St Mary's College. She attended university in New Zealand, where she qualified as a nurse. She remained in New Zealand, working in Dunedin, Wellington, Auckland and Gisborne, before returning to Samoa to work at the hospital in Motootua, where she was in charge of the children's ward. She held two noble titles; Leaupepe from her father's family, and Taulapapa from her mother's family.

In 1970 general elections Filipo contested the Palauli West constituency, and was elected unopposed, becoming the first female member of the Legislative Assembly. She switched to the A'ana Alofi No. 1 constituency for the 1973 elections and was re-elected, with her husband Vaovasamanaia Filipo winning her former seat in Palauli West. She was defeated in the 1976 elections, losing to Le'aupepetele Taoipu. During her time in the Legislative Assembly, she became the first woman to be elected Deputy Speaker.

In addition to her role in parliament, Filipo became the first female judge in the Land and Title Court.

After retiring, she moved to New Zealand, where she died in 2014. She was buried in Tulaele in Samoa.
