= Fatialofa Momoʻe =

Western Samoan politician

Minister for the Post Office, Radio and Broadcasting
- In office 1970–1971
- Preceded by: Faalavaau Galu
- Succeeded by: Fuimaono Moasope

Member of the Legislative Assembly
- In office 1967–1980
- Preceded by: Auelua Filipo
- Succeeded by: Tuilaepa Aiono Sailele Malielegaoi
- Constituency: Lepa

Personal details
- Born: 13 March 1923
- Died: 29 December 1980 (aged 57); Honolulu, United States

Tofa Fatialofa Momoʻe (13 March 1923 – 29 December 1980) was a Western Samoan politician. He served as a member of the Legislative Assembly from 1967 until his death, and as Minister for the Post Office, Radio and Broadcasting from 1970 to 1971.

== Biography ==
During his youth Momoʻe was a successful boxer. He was elected to the Legislative Assembly in 1967, unseating incumbent MLA Auelua Filipo. After being re-elected in 1970 he was appointed Minister for the Post Office, Radio and Broadcasting in the new government. However, he resigned from the cabinet the following year.

He was re-elected to the Legislative Assembly again in 1973, 1976 and 1979. He died in December 1980 during a visit to Honolulu to see the son of a friend ordained as a priest.
