= 1985 Western Samoan general election =

- 22 February 1985

All 47 seats in the Legislative Assembly 24 seats needed for a majority
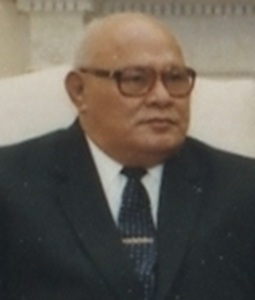

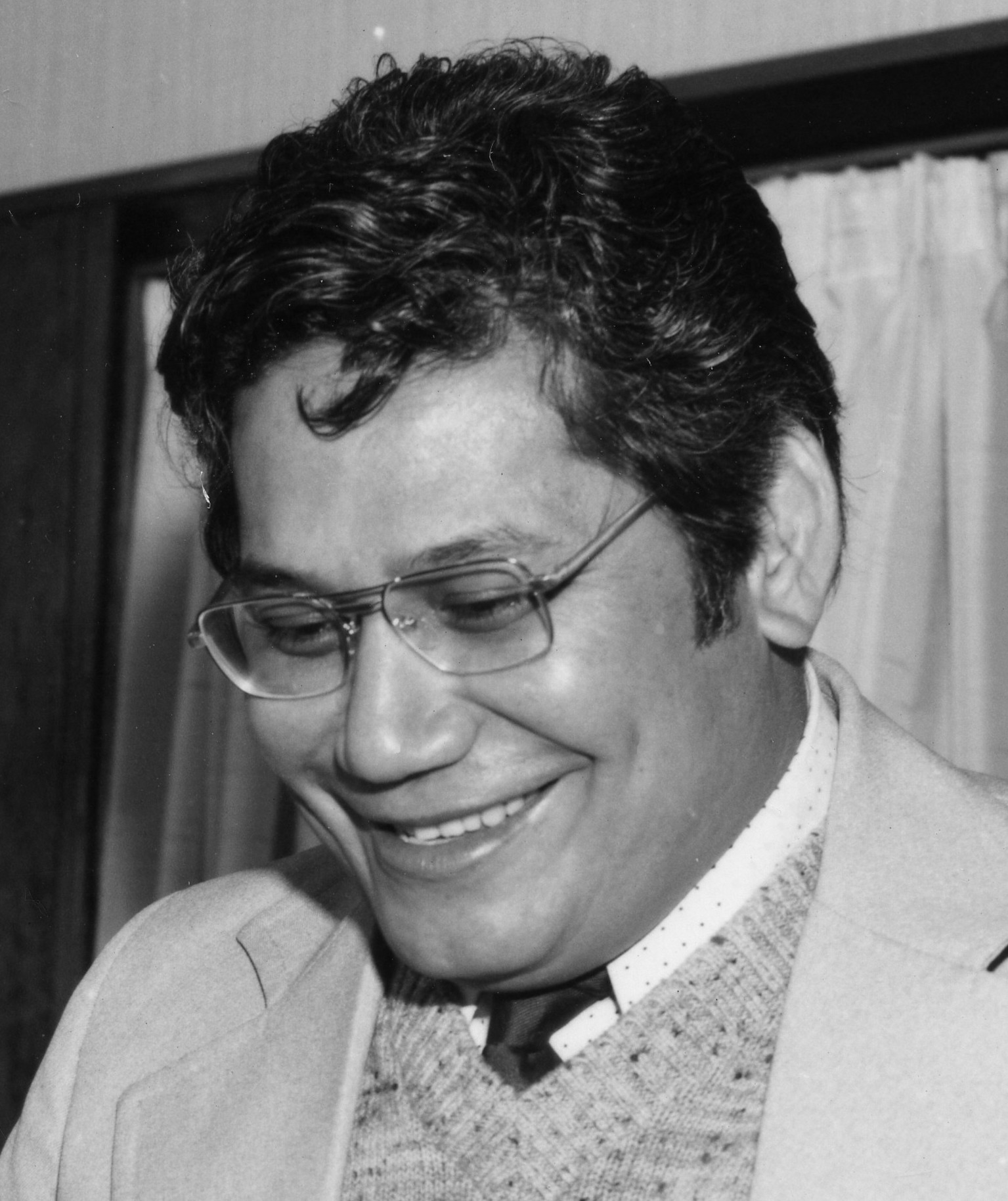
	First party	Second party
Leader	Tofilau Eti Alesana	Tui Ātua Tupua Tamasese Efi
Party	HRPP	CDP
Last election	22	–
Seats won	31	16
Seat change	▲9	New
Popular vote	4,698	2,052
Percentage	34.54%	15.09%
Prime Minister before election
Tofilau Eti Alesana
HRPP
Elected Prime Minister
Tofilau Eti Alesana
HRPP

General elections were held in Western Samoa on 22 February 1985. Voting was restricted to matai and citizens of European origin ("individual voters"), with the matai electing 45 MPs and Europeans two. The result was a victory for the Human Rights Protection Party, which won 31 seats. Its leader, Tofilau Eti Alesana, remained Prime Minister.

== Background ==
The 1982 election saw the Human Rights Protection Party win 22 seats. HRPP leader Va'ai Kolone was elected prime minister with the support of independents, defeating Tui Ātua Tupua Tamasese Efi by a single vote. Kolone subsequently lost his seat in an electoral petition, and Efi was appointed prime minister. Efi resigned in December 1982 after the government budget was rejected and was replaced as prime minister by Tofilau Eti Alesana, who had been elected leader of the HRPP after Kolone's departure.

== Campaign ==
In the leadup to the poll upporters of former prime minister Tupuola Taisi Tufuga Efi organised themselves as the Christian Democratic Party.

== Results ==
The HRPP won 31 seats. Fifteen of the 47 elected MPs were new to the Legislative Assembly. Minister of Health Lavea Lio lost his seat.

Party	Votes	%	Seats	+/–
Human Rights Protection Party	4,698	34.54	31	+9
Christian Democratic Party	2,052	15.09	16	New
Independents	6,850	50.37	0	0
Total	13,600	100.00	47	0
Valid votes	13,600	99.37		
Invalid/blank votes	86	0.63		
Total ballots cast		–		
Registered voters/turnout	19,013	–		
Source: PIM, Nohlen et al.

== Aftermath ==
Following the elections the HRPP held a two-day conference on 25–26 February at which it re-elected Tofilau Eti Alesana as its candidate for Prime Minister. On 7 March Va'ai Kolone resigned from the party. On 9 March the Legislative Assembly elected Alesana Prime Minister; he was the only candidate after Kolone declined to be nominated. Nonumalo Sofara was re-elected as Speaker.

However, in December Alesana's 1986 budget was rejected by the Assembly with 27 votes against and 19 supporting. As the head of state refused to dissolve the Assembly, Alesana resigned as Prime Minister on 27 December. Kolone, now leader of the opposition coalition, was then elected Prime Minister.

== See also ==
- List of members of the Legislative Assembly of Western Samoa (1985–1988)
