= Fiu Loimata II =

Samoan politician (died 2021)

Fiu Matamua Lausiva Nu'ualiitia Loimata II

Member of the Samoa Parliament for Fa'asaleleaga No. 1
- In office 26 April 1996 – 2 March 2001
- Preceded by: Tofilau Tauvaga
- Succeeded by: Seumanu Aita Ah Wa

Personal details
- Born: 1941 or 1942
- Died: 13 January 2021 (aged 79)
- Party: Human Rights Protection Party

Fiu Matamua Lausiva Nu'ualiitia Loimata II (1941/2 - 13 January 2021) was a Samoan politician and member of the Legislative Assembly of Samoa. He was a member of the Human Rights Protection Party.

Loimata was elected to the Fono at the 1996 election. He was not re-elected in 2001.
