= Toleafoa Talitimu =

Samoan politician

Speaker of the Legislative Assembly
- In office 1973–1976
- Preceded by: Magele Ate
- Succeeded by: Leota Leuluaiali'i Ituau Ale

Member of the Legislative Assembly
- In office 1979–1980
- Preceded by: Unasa Ioane
- Succeeded by: Leulu Laifaga
- In office 1973–1976
- Preceded by: Su'a Aloese
- Succeeded by: Unasa Ioane
- In office 1964–1967
- Preceded by: Segi Lafa
- Succeeded by: Su'a Aloese
- Constituency: Fa'asaleleaga No. 3

Personal details
- Died: October 1980 (aged 62) Faga, Western Samoa

Afioga Toleafoa Talitimu (died October 1980) was a Western Samoan songwriter and politician. He was a member of the Legislative Assembly in three spells between 1964 and his death, also serving as Speaker from 1973 until 1975.

== Biography ==
Talitimu was one of three well-known Iiga songwriter brothers, alongside Gatoloai Peseta Sio. He was elected to the Legislative Assembly from the Fa'asaleleaga No. 3 constituency in 1964. He was defeated by Su'a Aloese in the 1967 elections and unsuccessfully challenged him again in 1970.

In the 1973 elections he defeated Aloese by six votes. Following the elections, he was elected Speaker with 28 votes, defeating Leaupepe Faimaala (12) and Teo Fetu (6). However, he lost his seat in the 1976 elections when he was defeated by Unasa Ioane. In the 1979 elections he returned to the Legislative Assembly, and was a candidate for the deputy speakership, losing by 23 votes to 24 to Aeau Taulupoo.

He died in Faga on Savai'i island in October 1980 at the age of 62.
