= Fepuleai Semi =

Samoan ex-politician

Member of the Samoa Parliament for Salega
- In office 11 March 1982 – 26 February 1988
- Preceded by: Leilua Manuao
- Succeeded by: Leilua Manuao

Fepuleai Seminary Iakopo is a former Samoan politician. He was a member of the Legislative Assembly of Samoa from 1982 to 1988.

Fepuleai was first elected to the Legislative Assembly in a by-election in 1982. He gave his first speech on 28 February and 1 March 1983. He lost his seat at the 1988 election. He later moved to New Zealand, where he ran three companies providing labour to fruit and vegetable growers. In 1991 he was made a Justice of the peace. He was bankrupted between 1997 and 2000. In 2009 he was convicted of 46 counts of GST and income tax evasion involving more than $800,000 of unpaid tax, and sentenced to two years home detention.

In 2003 he organised a petition and protest march to parliament against the Citizenship (Western Samoa) Act 1982, which had stripped Samoans of New Zealand citizenship. In August 2022 he supported New Zealand Green Party MP Teanau Tuiono's member's bill to repeal the Act.
