= 1988 Western Samoan general election =

- 26 February 1988

All 47 seats in the Legislative Assembly 24 seats needed for a majority
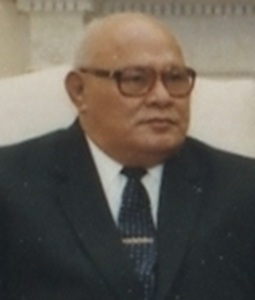

	First party	Second party
Leader	Tofilau Eti Alesana	Vaʻai Kolone
Party	HRPP	CDP-Kolone
Last election	31	–
Seats won	23	24
Seat change	▼9	New
Popular vote	5,017	2,300
Percentage	35.87%	16.45%
Swing	▲1.33pp	New
Prime Minister before election
Tofilau Eti Alesana
HRPP
Elected Prime Minister
Tofilau Eti Alesana
HRPP

General elections were held in Western Samoa on 26 February 1988. Voting was restricted to Matai and citizens of European origin ("individual voters"), with the Matai electing 45 MPs and Europeans two. Although the Human Rights Protection Party received more than double the number of votes of the alliance of the Christian Democratic Party and the Va'ai Kolone Group, it won one fewer seat. However, on the day of the election of the Prime Minister by Parliament, one Coalition MP defected to the HRPP, allowing its leader Tofilau Eti Alesana to be elected Prime Minister.

== Background ==
The 1985 election resulted in a landslide victory for the Human Rights Protection Party. HRPP leader Tofilau Eti Alesana was elected as prime minister, but his government collapsed in December 1985 after 11 HRPP MP's under former HRPP leader and prime minsiter Vaʻai Kolone crossed the floor to vote against Tofilau's budget. Kolone was subsequently elected prime minister after forming a coalition with the Christian Democratic Party.

== Campaign ==
The campaign was marked by widespread treating and allegations of corporate and foreign fuding.

== Results ==
Party	Votes	%	Seats	+/–
Human Rights Protection Party	5,017	35.87	23	−9
Coalition	2,300	16.45	24	New
Independents	6,668	47.68	0	0
Total	13,985	100.00	47	0
Valid votes	13,985	99.41		
Invalid/blank votes	83	0.59		
Total ballots cast		–		
Registered voters/turnout	23,160	–		
Source: Nohlen et al.

== Aftermath ==
The coalition won a 27-19 majority on election day. Subsequent realignments reduced this to a 23-23 tie, before a recount in the seat of Falealili gave the coalition a one-seat majority. However when parliament met to elect the prime minister, coalition MP Tanuvasa Livigisitone supported the HRPP, and Tofilau Eti Alesana was re-elected prime minister.

The coalition subsequently formalised itself as the Samoan National Development Party with Efi as leader and Kolone as deputy.

Electoral petitions resulted in four by-elections being held on 23 July 1988.

== See also ==
- List of members of the Legislative Assembly of Western Samoa (1988–1991)
