= Ring Record Book and Boxing Encyclopedia =

The Ring Record Book and Boxing Encyclopedia is a book published yearly by The Ring magazine. It was first published by sportswriter Nat Fleischer in 1942 and continued until 1986.

== History ==
=== Origins ===
Ring editor Nat Fleischer, noting that other sports had record books and that boxing did not have any books specialized in keeping fans up to date as far as the participants' records, began writing the first Ring boxing encyclopedia in 1941. It was published for the first time in 1942. Fleischer wanted to create a book that would keep fans informed about the history of boxing and their favorite fighters, and, at the same time, help fighters' managers and promoters choose who their protégé's next opponent should be. It also included a detailed history of title fights for each division, and a section of a list of boxing record setters.

With time, the book would also include round by round scoring for each title fight held on the year prior. At its peak, the book consisted of close to 600 pages of records and stats.

After Fleischer died in 1972, Stanley Weston took over the production and edition of the yearly encyclopedia book. During this period, Ring Record book and boxing Encyclopedias were hard-cover books, with a glossy, outside cover that had color photos of famous modern fighters of the era.

=== Post-1994 ===
In 1990, The Ring magazine went bankrupt, and the Ring Encyclopedia stopped being produced. In 1992, The Ring magazine returned to the stands, but it wasn't until 1994 that the encyclopedia returned.

The new version of the Ring Record Book and Boxing Encyclopedia is a smaller, pocket sized book with a different context separating it from the original one. It is a soft cover book that covers the history of each division, but including only the fights where world titles changed hands. It also includes a recap of title fights held the year before, but without the judges' scorecards for any of the fights. It only has the records of current world champions (except WBO ones, as The Ring magazine has always refused to recognize WBO world champions as such), and of leading contenders. It also has a recap of Ring's articles of the past twelve months. Currently, the encyclopedic books are edited by Steve Farhood.

The original version of the encyclopedia, which was a mail-order item, topped at a price of 25 dollars. Many books in the original format are now collector's items, and as such, their prices have gone up. The new version usually sells for 5 dollars at many supermarkets and other stores.
