= 1961 Western Samoan referendum =

- 10 May 1961

Do you agree with the Constitution, adopted by the Constitutional Convention on 28 October 1960?
For	86.49%
Against	13.51%

Do you agree that on 1 January 1962 Western Samoa should become an independent State on the basis of that Constitution?
For	85.40%
Against	14.60%

A double referendum on a new constitution and independence took place in Western Samoa on 10 May 1961. A Constitutional Assembly of Matai and associated groups had been elected the previous year to draw up a proposed constitution. It reflected the Westminster system of parliamentary democracy, but restricted both standing and voting in elections to the Matai. The referendums were supervised by the United Nations, and with both approved, the country gained independence on 1 January the following year.

== Background ==
Following its capture from Germany during the First World War, Western Samoa had been administered as the Trust Territory of Western Samoa by New Zealand. Whilst self-government started to be given in the 1930s, there was regular international pressure for Western Samoan independence. By 1959, Western Samoa and New Zealand agreed to the principle of terminating the trusteeship. However, because the Western Samoan legislature was run on Faʻamatai suffrage, the United Nations insisted on a formal referendum before terminating the trustee status to be sure that the proposed new constitution represented what the Samoan people wanted. This was in keeping with the UN practice for requests made from non-fully elected trustee legislatures. The referendums were the first to be held under universal suffrage in Western Samoa.

== Results ==
The Western Samoans voted overwhelmingly in favour of the new constitution and later for independence.

=== New constitution ===
Do you agree with the Constitution, adopted by the Constitutional Convention on 28 October 1960?

Choice	Votes	%
For	31,426	86.49
Against	4,909	13.51
Invalid/blank votes	1,562	–
Total	37,897	100
Source: Direct Democracy

=== Independence ===
Do you agree that on 1 January 1962 Western Samoa should become an independent State on the basis of that Constitution?

Choice	Votes	%
For	29,882	85.40
Against	5,108	14.60
Invalid/blank votes	2,907	–
Total	37,897	100
Source: Direct Democracy

== Aftermath ==
The result of the referendums obliged New Zealand to impliment legislation to bring effect to the wishes of the Western Samoans. New Zealand did this with the Western Samoa Act 1961 to sever Western Samoa's links with the Crown of New Zealand. The United Nations General Assembly voted unanimously to terminate the trusteeship, leaving Western Samoa as an independent nation from 1 January 1962.
