= 1982 Western Samoan general election =

- 27 February 1982

All 47 in the Legislative Assembly 24 seats needed for a majority
	First party
Leader	Vaʻai Kolone
Party	HRPP
Last election	–
Seats won	22
Seat change	New
Prime Minister before election
Tupuola Efi
Independent
Subsequent Prime Minister
Vaʻai Kolone
HRPP

General elections were held in Western Samoa on 27 February 1982. The Human Rights Protection Party won 22 of the 47 seats in the Legislative Assembly and was able to form a government after three independents voted for its leader, Va'ai Kolone, in the vote for prime minister.

== Electoral system ==
The Legislative Assembly consisted of 45 Samoan members elected from 41 one or two-member constituencies and two 'individual voters' elected from a nationwide two-member constituency. Voting in the Samoan constituencies was restricted to Matai, while only citizens of European origin could vote in the individual voters constituency. Only around 15,567 people were enfranchised from a population of around 160,000.

== Results ==
HRPP candidates won 22 seats, 11 of which were newcomers to the Legislative Assembly. MPs who had supported the government of Tupuola Efi won 11 seats. Several sitting MPs lost their seats, including Economic Affairs Minister Letiu Tamatoa, Speaker Tuuu Faletoese, Deputy Speaker Aeau Taulupoo and five HRPP members.

Party	Votes	%	Seats	+/–
Human Rights Protection Party			22	New
Independents			25	−22
Total			47	0
Valid votes	11,926	99.38		
Invalid/blank votes	75	0.62		
Total ballots cast		–		
Registered voters/turnout	15,567	–		
Source: Pacific Islands Monthly, Nohlen et al.

== Aftermath ==
In the vote for prime minister on 13 April, HRPP leader Va'ai Kolone defeated Tupuola Efi by 24 votes to 23. Aiono Nonumalo Sofara of the HRPP was elected Speaker by the same margin, defeating Asi Faamatala.

In June a court annulled the result in Vaimauga East after finding the winning candidate – Fuataga Laulu, who was subsequently appointed Minister of Education – guilty of treating voters. Later in the year the result in Kolone's seat was also annulled after a court decided his campaign had been illegal. Tupuola Efi subsequently became prime minister in his place. Efi offered cabinet portfolios to new HRPP leader Tofilau Eti Alesana and Le Mamea Ropati, but they refused to attend the swearing-in ceremony in protest at Kolone's removal from office. However, Efi resigned in December after the government budget was rejected and was replaced as prime minister by Eti Alesana. Kolone returned to parliament in January after winning the by-election for his former seat.

== See also ==
- List of members of the Legislative Assembly of Western Samoa (1982–1985)
