= Faʻasoʻotauloa Pati Taulapapa =

Samoan politician

Minister of Lands and Environment
- In office 1991–1996
- Prime Minister: Tofilau Eti Alesana

Member of the Samoan Parliament for Gaga'emauga No. 2
- In office 6 November 2015 – 9 April 2021
- Preceded by: Olo Fiti Vaai
- Succeeded by: Seuamuli Fasi Toma
- In office 5 April 1991 – 31 March 2006
- Preceded by: Faʻasoʻotauloa Pualagi
- Succeeded by: Olo Fiti Vaai

Personal details
- Party: Human Rights Protection Party

Faʻasoʻotauloa Pati Taulapapa is a Samoan politician and former Cabinet Minister. He is a member of the Human Rights Protection Party.

Taulapapa lived in Wellington in the late 1960s, where he started a takeaway bar, and later ran a shop, taxis, and rental properties. He returned to Samoa in 1985, became a farmer, and opened a bakery.

He was first elected to the Legislative Assembly of Samoa at the 1991 election as a candidate for the HRPP. At one stage he served as Minister of Lands. He lost his seat in the 2006 election, but regained it in 2016 after the incumbent switched seats. In March 2016 he was appointed Associate Minister of Agriculture and Fisheries.

In January 2021 Taulapapa announced he was retiring from politics at the 2021 election.
