= Unasa Mesi Galo =

Samoan politician (died 2019)

Minister of Justice
- In office 24 April 2006 – 21 March 2011
- Prime Minister: Tuilaepa Aiono Sailele Malielegaoi
- Preceded by: Ga'ina Tino
- Succeeded by: Fiame Naomi Mataʻafa

Member of the Samoa Parliament for Fa'asalele'aga No. 3
- In office 2 March 2001 – 4 March 2011
- Preceded by: Tea Tooala Peato
- Succeeded by: Tuileutu Alava'a Voi
- In office 5 April 1991 – 26 April 1996
- Preceded by: Unasa Lio
- Succeeded by: Tea Tooala Peato

Personal details
- Died: 27 October 2019
- Party: Human Rights Protection Party

Unasa Mesi Galo (~1939 – 27 October 2019) was a Samoan politician and Cabinet Minister. He was a member of the Human Rights Protection Party.

Unasa was first elected to the Legislative Assembly of Samoa in the 1991 election. He lost his seat in the 1996 election, but was then re-elected in 2001. After being narrowly re-elected at the 2006 election he was appointed Minister of Justice. In December 2006 he was accused of contempt of court after violating an order from the Land and Titles Court of Samoa to cease logging on disputed land. Following the dispute the government banned commercial logging of native forest. In February 2010 he won a defamation suit against a woman who had accused him of drunk-driving.

He lost his seat at the 2011.
