= Constitution of Samoa =

Written constitution which is the supreme law in Samoa

The Constitution of Samoa is a written constitution which is the supreme law in Samoa. It establishes Samoa as a parliamentary republic with a Westminster system and responsible government. It outlines the structure and powers of the Samoan government's three parts: the executive, legislature, and judiciary.

The constitution was drafted by a pair of constitutional conventions in 1954 and 1960. The final draft was approved by a referendum in 1961, and came into force when Samoa became independent on 1 January 1962.

The constitution can be amended by a two-thirds majority of the Legislative Assembly. It has been frequently amended, especially during the period of Human Rights Protection Party dominance from 1997 to 2021, often for the advantage of the ruling party.

== History ==
Samoa became a United Nations trust territory in 1947, and began a transition towards self-government and independence. In March 1953 the New Zealand government issued a "statement of policy" proposing internal self-government for Samoa under a Westminster model, with a prime minister, cabinet, and legislature elected by universal suffrage. The proposals were considered by a constitutional convention in November 1954. This adopted a series of broad principles for a future government, including a parliamentary system. One controversial provision was that rather than universal suffrage, only matai would have the right to vote and stand for election. This was reluctantly accepted by the New Zealand government as "the present wish of an overwhelming majority of the Samoan people". The proposals were formally adopted by the Legislative Assembly of Samoa in February 1956. An important provision was that Tupua Tamasese Meaʻole and Malietoa Tanumafili II would jointly act as head of state until their death or resignation, with future heads of state being chosen by the legislature. The relationship with New Zealand would be decided at a future date, but would likely be modeled on that then prevailing between Tonga and the United Kingdom.

In 1959 the New Zealand government formed a "Working Committee on Self Government", consisting of Tupua, Malietoa, seven elected members of the Executive Council, and seven members of the Legislative Assembly. With the assistance of constitutional scholars James Wightman Davidson and Colin Aikman they produced a draft constitution. A second constitutional convention was held in 1960 to debate the draft, and after debating it article by article, it was approved on 28 October 1960. The constitution was approved by 86.5% of the vote in a referendum on 10 May 1961, and came into force when Samoa became independent on 1 January 1962.

== Provisions ==
The constitution is divided into a preamble, twelve parts, and three schedules.

=== Preamble ===
The preamble enacts the constitution in the name of the Samoan people. It also lists the members of the constitutional convention which drafted it.

=== Part I ===
Article 1 declares the state of Samoa (originally Western Samoa) to be a free and sovereign "Christian nation founded on God the Father, the Son and the Holy Spirit"; it also declares its geographic boundaries. Article 2 establishes that the constitution is the supreme law of Samoa, and that laws which are inconsistent with it are void.

=== Part II ===
Part II of the constitution affirms fundamental rights, including the right to life (Article 5); freedom from arbitrary arrest and detention (Article 6); freedom from torture and inhuman or degrading treatment or punishment (Article 7); freedom from forced labour (Article 8); the right to a fair trial and the presumption of innocence (Article 9); the right not to be convicted except by law, to the benefit of any lesser penalty, and against double jeopardy (Article 10); freedom of religion (Articles 11 and 12); freedom of speech, assembly, association, and movement (Article 13); the right to property (Article 14); and freedom from discrimination (Article 15). Article 4 gives the Supreme Court of Samoa jurisdiction to enforce these rights.

=== Part III ===
Part III establishes the office of the O le Ao o le Malo (head of state) and defines its powers. It also establishes the Council of Deputies. An important provision requires the O le Ao o le Malo to act on the advice of ministers, making Samoa a Westminster system.

=== Part IV ===
Part IV establishes the executive: the prime minister and Cabinet. It also establishes the attorney-general of Samoa as a constitutional officer.

=== Part V ===
Part V establishes the Parliament of Samoa, consisting of the O le Ao o le Malo and the Legislative Assembly. It provides for the Legislative Assembly's membership, powers and privileges, as well as the offices of speaker, deputy speaker, and clerk.

=== Part VI ===
Part VI establishes the judiciary, consisting the Supreme Court of Samoa and the Court of Appeal of Samoa, and the office of the chief justice of Samoa. It also establishes a Judicial Services Commission to oversee the judiciary and advise on appointments, and provides for subordinate courts to be provided for by legislation.

=== Part VIA ===
Part VIA, inserted in 2015, establishes the ombudsman (Komesina o Sulufaiga) as an independent constitutional office.

=== Part VII ===
Part VII governs the public service, and establishes a Public Service Commission to oversee it.

=== Part VIII ===
Part VIII governs public finance, appropriation and expenditure, and establishes the controller and auditor general to audit and oversee them.

=== Part IX ===
Part IX governs land and titles, and establishes the Land and Titles Court of Samoa to hear disputes. An important clause forbids the alienation of customary land.

=== Part X ===
Part X provides for emergency powers, allowing for proclamations of emergency and the use of emergency orders while an emergency is in force. These powers were used during the COVID-19 pandemic in Samoa.

=== Part XI ===
Part XI includes general and miscellaneous clauses, It provides for the constitution to be amended by a two-thirds majority in parliament and establishes that the O le Ao o le Malo has a power of pardon. Other clauses define terms for the interpretation of the constitution, and define the date on which the constitution came into effect.

=== Part XII ===
Part XII governs transitional issues, including the continuation of existing laws, the transfer of government property, the continuance of ministers, MPs, and judges in office as if they had been elected or appointed under the new provisions, and the transfer of existing court cases to the new courts.

=== Schedules ===
The constitution originally contained three schedules. The first two schedules, governing the election of the O le Ao o le Malo and the election of MPs by non-Samoan "individual voters", were repealed in 2015. Only the third, containing the oaths of office for various positions, survives.

== Interpretation ==
The Supreme Court of Samoa has primary jurisdiction to interpret the constitution and rule on matters of fundamental rights, with the Court of Appeal of Samoa hearing appeals on these questions. The courts' established approach to interpretation is to "consider the words of the provisions principally in issue, the constitutional and legal context in which they appear, and the wider social and historical context in which they are to be understood" A secondary principle of interpretation is that "the Constitution is given its best effect when it promotes human rights"; where competing interpretations are available, "primacy should be given to whichever of the competing ideas best promotes the establishment of human rights practice in Samoa".

== Amendments ==
Samoa's constitution has been frequently amended. The Supreme Court has expressed concern about amendments being passed "as if an ordinary legislation were being amended", and urged the Legislative Assembly to pass future amendments by "a comprehensive process including full and extensive prior consultation". Major constitutional amendments include:

- In 1991 the term of parliament was extended from three years to five years.
- In 1997, in response to Controller and Chief Auditor Sua Rimoni Ah Chong tabling an annual report revealing widespread corruption by government ministers, the Human Rights Protection Party amended the constitution to change the position's term of appointment from life-tenure to three years, and to permit them to be removed by a simple majority vote in parliament. These changes were largely reversed in 2014, when the office was made an independent office of parliament, its term was extended from three years to twelve, and the threshold for removal was raised from a simple majority to a two-thirds majority.
- Also in 1997 the constitution was amended to change the country's name from "Western Samoa" to "Samoa".
- In 2005, the mandatory age of retirement for judges was raised from 62 to 68.
- In 2010 following a Supreme Court ruling which overturned an attempt to unseat opposition MPs and questioned the constitutionality of anti-party-hopping provisions in the Electoral Act, the constitution was amended to allow MPs to be removed from office if they changed political parties. Amendments to the Electoral Act empowered by this clause were then used to force the resignation of three opposition MPs.
- In 2013 the constitution was amended to ensure a minimum of 10 per cent of seats in parliament are reserved for women. The activation of this clause after a close election was a trigger for the 2021 Samoan constitutional crisis.
- In 2015 a clause was inserted to make the director of public prosecutions an independent constitutional officer. After the first director, Mauga Precious Chang, was prosecuted for driving offences, the government introduced a constitutional amendment to disestablish the position, removing it in 2017. Other amendments replaced the "individual voter" seats with "urban constituencies", inserted part VIA establishing the ombudsman as an independent constitutional officer, and provided for the speaker of the Legislative Assembly to be appointed by the party that wins a majority of seats. The latter clause was decisive in resolving the 2021 constitutional crisis.
- In 2017 a clause was added to article 1 declaring that Samoa was "a Christian nation founded on God".
- In 2019 further constitutional amendments eliminated the urban constituencies, limited the O le Ao o le Malo to two terms, and expanded the Judicial Services Commission.
- In 2020 amendments passed alongside the Land and Titles Bill removed the jurisdiction of Samoa's civil and criminal courts over issues within the jurisdiction of the Land and Titles Court, and established new Land and Titles Court appellate divisions, effectively creating a parallel justice system. The amendments also made it easier to remove judges from office.

== See also ==
- 2021 Samoan constitutional crisis
