= Vaovasamanaia Filipo =

Samoan politician

Vaovasamanaia Reginald Filipo (also known as Reginald Paul Phillips) (died 1993) was a Samoan politician, Cabinet Minister, and Judge. He was the first Samoan appointed Chief Justice of Samoa.

Vaovasamanaia Reginald was the husband of Samoan politician Faimaala Filipo. He was elected to the Legislative Assembly of Samoa in the 1973 election, winning the seat of Palauli West which had previously been held by his wife. In 1975 he was appointed Minister of Agriculture in the Cabinet of Tupua Tamasese. He was re-elected at the 1976 election and appointed Minister of Finance in the government of Tui Atua Tupua Tamasese Efi, a role he held until 1982. In May 1983 he was appointed Chief Justice by Prime Minister Tofilau Eti Alesana, and resigned from the Fono.

Filipo later served as Ombudsman in 1993, and died in office.

Political offices
Preceded by Russell Callander	Chief Justice of Samoa; 1983-?	Succeeded by Trevor Maxwell
