= 1976 Western Samoan general election =

← 1973	21 February 1976	1979 →

All 47 seats in the Legislative Assembly
	First party
Party	Independents
Last election	47 seats
Seats won	47
Seat change	Steady
Prime Minister before election
Tupua Tamasese Lealofi IV
Acting
Independent
Subsequent Prime Minister
Tupuola Efi
Independent

General elections were held in Western Samoa on 21 February 1976. All candidates ran as independents and voting was restricted to Matai and citizens of European origin ("individual voters"), with the Matai electing 45 MPs and Europeans two. Following the election, Tupuola Efi became prime minister.

== Background ==
In the aftermath of the previous elections held in 1973, parliament elected Fiamē Mataʻafa Faumuina Mulinuʻu II to another non-consecutive term as prime minister, defeating the incumbent Tupua Tamasese Lealofi IV and challenger Tupuola Efi. Fiamē served as Western Samoa's head of government until his death two years later in 1975. The O le Ao o le Malo (head of state) Malietoa Tanumafili II appointed Tupua Tamasese to serve as acting prime minister until the next election.

== Campaign ==
A total of 169 candidates contested the 47 seats. Four seats had only one candidate, who was returned unopposed.

== Results ==
Of the 36 incumbent MLAs contesting the elections, only 14 were re-elected. Ministers Alfonso Philipp and Fepuleai Samuelu were amongst those losing their seats.

Party	Votes	%	Seats
Independents	9,203	100.00	47
Total	9,203	100.00	47
Valid votes	9,203	98.95	
Invalid/blank votes	98	1.05	
Total ballots cast		–	
Registered voters/turnout	12,254	–	
Source: Nohlen et al.

== Aftermath ==
The election result in Fa'asaleleaga No. 4 where I'iga Suafole had won by one vote was overturned following a petition by runner-up Mulitalo Siafausa, who claimed that unqualified voters had participated in the election. The Supreme Court annulled one vote for Suafole, and a by-election was ordered for the seat.

Following the elections, the Legislative Assembly elected Leota Leuluaiali'i Ituau Ale as Speaker. In the contest for prime minister, Tupuola Efi defeated the incumbent Tupua Tamasese Lealofi IV by 31 votes to 16, becoming the first prime minister not to hold one of the four Tama-a-Aiga titles. Efi appointed a nine-member cabinet, while Lealofi resigned from the Assembly and was elected to the Council of Deputies.

Position	Minister
Prime Minister	Tupuola Efi
Minister of Agriculture	Fuimaono Mimio
Minister of Communications	Tofaeono Tile
Minister of Economic Affairs	Asi Eikeni
Minister of Education	Lilomaiava Niko
Minister of Finance	Vaovasamanaia Filipo
Minister of Justice	Ulualofaiga Talamaivao Niko
Minister of Lands	Mano Togamau
Minister of Works	Letiu Tamatoa

== See also ==
- List of members of the Legislative Assembly of Western Samoa (1976–1979)
