= Tuiloma Pule Lameko =

Samoan politician (1935–2018)

Member of the Council of Deputies
- In office 6 February 2016 – 2 April 2018 Serving with Le Mamea Ropati
- Prime Minister: Tuilaepa Aiono Sailele Malielegaoi
- O le Ao o le Malo: Tupua Tamasese Efi; Va'aletoa Sualauvi II

Minister of Revenue
- In office 21 March 2011 – 6 February 2016
- Prime Minister: Tuilaepa Aiono Sailele Malielegaoi
- Preceded by: Tuu'u Anasi'i Leota
- Succeeded by: Tialavea Tionisio Hunt

Member of the Samoa Parliament for Falealili
- In office 26 April 1996 – 4 March 2016
- Succeeded by: None (Seat split)

Member of the Samoa Parliament for Safata
- In office 18 August 1979 – 1991
- Preceded by: Muliagatele Vena
- Succeeded by: Lesa Farani Posala Manua

Personal details
- Born: 6 July 1935 Falealili, Western Samoa
- Died: 1 April 2018 (aged 83–84) Apia, Samoa
- Party: Human Rights Protection Party

Tuiloma Pule Alaimoana Unasa Lameko Gae’e (6 July 1935 – 1 April 2018) was a Samoan politician and Cabinet Minister. He was a member of the Human Rights Protection Party.

Lameko was born in Falealili. Initially educated at a free church school, he later attended Poutasi Primary School. He gained entry to Avele School using a younger cousin's birth certificate, as he was too old to attend. He briefly attended Samoa College and a teachers training college, but in both cases left due to inability to pay fees. While working as a cashier, he took night classes to train as an accountant. He worked for the Treasury Department, then after serving a secondment to the International Monetary Fund in 1975 was appointed the first manager of the Samoa Shipping Corporation in 1976.

He was first elected to the Legislative Assembly of Samoa in a by-election in 1979, after Muliagatele Vena was unseated for bribery. He held the seat until 1991. Between 1991 and 1996 he served as Public Service Commissioner. In 1996 he returned to parliament representing Falealili. He served as Minister of Agriculture and Minister of Sports & Cultural Affairs in the government of Tofilau Eti Alesana and as Associate Minister to the Prime Minister and later Minister of Revenue under Tuilaepa Aiono Sailele Malielegaoi.

In February 2016 he stepped down from parliament in order to be appointed to the Council of Deputies.

Lameko died at Tupua Tamasese Meaole Hospital in Apia in April 2018. His death was marked with a public holiday and a state funeral.

Lameko also served as president of Samoa Rugby Union.
