= Polataivao Fosi =

Samoan boxer and politician

Fosi Schmidt
Personal information
- Nicknames: Brown Hawk, King Pola
- Born: Afioga Polataivao; 1933 Safotu, Savai'i, Samoa
- Died: 19 December 2005 (aged 71–72)
- Height: 5 ft 11 in (1.80 m)
- Weight: Heavyweight

Boxing career

Boxing record
- Wins: 52
- Win by KO: 52
- Losses: 2
- Draws: 0
- No contests: 0

Polataivao Fosi Schmidt (1933–2005) was a Samoan politician and a member of the Legislative Assembly of Samoa from 1964-1999. He was a member of the Human Rights Protection Party.

Before his career in politics, Schmidt was the heavyweight boxing champion of Samoa, and scored over 80 knockouts victories in both amateur and professional boxing.

== Boxing career ==
Fosi Schmidt (some sources list Fossi Schmidt) developed a keen interest in boxing from watching members of the United States military forces training in Australia during World War II. After compiling an undefeated amateur record of 30-0-0, 30 knockouts, Schmidt decided to become a professional boxer in 1952.

Schmidt ran up an impressive string of knockouts on the Samoan Islands and won the Samoan Heavyweight Boxing Championship. Schmidt said he trained on a diet of coconuts, coconut milk, and taro (similar to a potato) to give him his power.

On February 10, 1954, in Leififi on the Samoan Islands, Schmidt was sparring with local police constable Vaipou Ainu'u; an amateur heavyweight boxer. The two were training in a ring at the local police station when Schmidt knocked Ainu'u down. Ainu'u's head struck the ring floor and efforts to revive him failed. The 35-year-old Ainu'u died on the way to the hospital. Schmidt was greatly disturbed by Ainu'u's death, but realized it was a terrible accident, and he continued on with his career.

After going 47-0-0, 47 knockouts on the Samoan Islands, Schmidt traveled to Australia to continue his boxing training and career. After three consecutive knockouts in Australia, he became a headliner in the Australian newspapers.

Schmidt was dubbed the "Samoan Sensation" and appeared on the cover of the October 1954 issue of Australian Ring Digest. In October 1954, world lightheavyweight champion Archie Moore was touring Australia and a bout with Schmidt was purposed, but never happened.

The 1955 Ring Record Book credited Schmidt with scoring 50 consecutive knockouts, including knockouts over Tauso M'U KO 2 rounds, Fetuao KO 1 round, Lini KO 2 rounds, Loie KO 3 rounds, Viane KO 1 round, Enesi KO 2 rounds, Pili KO 2 rounds, Silipa KO 2 rounds, Filipo KO 2 rounds, Sefo KO 1 round and KO 2 rounds, Iefata KO 4 rounds.

Schmidt's undefeated knockout streak was ended when he lost to Fiji heavyweight Henry Bray by 5th round knockout (Source: 1955 Ring Record Book).

On 8 December 1954, Schmidt was knocked out in 3 rounds by Ross Jenkins. Schmidt continued to fight, but never again showed the promise of his earlier undefeated career.

== Professional boxing record ==
Professional Boxing Record
Result	Record	Opponent	Method	Date	Round	Time	Event	Location	Notes
Win	52-2-0	(Australia) Merv Cobb	KO	1955 Feb 17	8			Australia	
Win	51-2-0	(Australia) Steven Zoranich	KO	1955 Jan 24	3			Perth, Australia	
Loss	50-1-0	(Australia) Ross Jenkins	KO	1954 Dec 8	3			New South Wales	
Loss	50-0-0	Henry Bray	KO	1954	5				
Win	50-0-0	Al McCoy	KO	1954 Oct 07	1			New South Wales	
Win	49-0-0	Harold Davis	KO	1954 Sep 23	3			New South Wales	
Win	48-0-0	Jack Dempsey	TKO	1954 Sep 09	2			New South Wales	
Win	47-0-0	Vaipou Ainu'a	KO	1954 Feb 10	1			Samoan Islands	Ainu'a died of his injuries.
Win	46-0-0	Lefata	KO	1954	4			Samoan Islands	
Win	45-0-0	Sefo	KO	1954	2			Samoan Islands	
Win	44-0-0	Sefo	KO	1954	1			Samoan Islands	
Win	43-0-0	Filipo	KO	1954	2			Samoan Islands	
Win	42-0-0	Silipa	KO	1954	2			Samoan Islands	
Win	41-0-0	Pili	KO	1954	2			Samoan Islands	
Win	40-0-0	Enes	KO	1954	2			Samoan Islands	
Win	39-0-0	Viane	KO	1954	1			Samoan Islands	
Win	38-0-0	Loie	KO	1954	3			Samoan Islands	
Win	37-0-0	Lini	KO	1954	2			Samoan Islands	
Win	36-0-0	L\Fetuao	KO	1954	1			Samoan Islands	
Win	35-0-0	Tauso M'U	KO	1954	2			Samoan Islands	
Win	34-0-0	Loi	KO	1953	2			Samoan Islands	
Win	33-0-0	Filipo	KO	1953	2			Samoan Islands	
Win	32-0-0	Isaako	KO	1953	1			Samoan Islands	
Win	31-0-0	Setu	KO	1953	1			Samoan Islands	
Win	30-0-0	Afano	KO	1953	2			Samoan Islands	
Win	29-0-0	Malia	KO	1953	2			Samoan Islands	
Win	28-0-0	Enes	KO	1953	2			Samoan Islands	
Win	27-0-0	Idelu	KO	1953	1			Samoan Islands	
Win	26-0-0	Loie	KO	1953	3			Samoan Islands	
Win	25-0-0	Filipo	KO	1953	2			Samoan Islands	
Win	24-0-0	Fetuao	KO	1953	1			Samoan Islands	
Win	23-0-0	Iona	KO	1953	2			Samoan Islands	
Win	22-0-0	Leki	KO	1952	3			Samoan Islands	
Win	21-0-0	Lakupo	KO	1952	1			Samoan Islands	
Win	20-0-0	Fata	KO	1952	1			Samoan Islands	
Win	19-0-0	Apelu	KO	1952	2			Samoan Islands	

== Business and political career ==
In the early 1960s, Schmidt opened a number of successful trading stations. He also owned and ran the Apollo 11 nightclub in Saleufi.

In 1964, Schmidt entered politics and was elected to parliament, winning his election by a count of 41 votes to 36, in the electoral district of Gagaifomauga Number 3. He became known to his fellow Samoans as "King Pola". Schmidt was re-elected without opposition in three subsequent elections. Schmidt served in parliament from 1964-1999, but resigned due to bad health.

He was a Minister of Health, a Minister of Labour, and a Minister of Lands and Environment. Schmidt was a founding member of his country's Human Rights Protection Party.

== Personal life ==
His mother was from Safune and his father from Safotu village on the island of Savai'i. Schmidt is the father of Samoan politician Laauli Leuatea Polataivao. He was of partial German descent.

From 1999-2005, Schmidt underwent dialysis treatment in both New Zealand and Australia. He died on 19 December 2005, of heart failure. He was survived by his wife Ipuniuesea, and his 6 children.

== Sources ==
- Australian Ring Digest, October 1954: SAMOAN SENSATION-FOSSIE SCHMIDT.
- 1955 Ring Record Book, 1955, page 74: Ring Deaths in 1954.
- 1955 Ring Record Book, 1955, page 833: Record: FOSSI(BROWNHAWK)SCHMIDT.
- 1955 Ring Record Book, 1955, page 733: Record: HENRY BRAY.
- www.eventpolynesia.com
- Pacific Magazine, March 1, 2006: People's Briefs: IN MEMORIAM.
- Samoa Newsroom, April 2-April 8, 2006.
