= Aiono Nonumalo Sofara =

Samoan politician

Aiono Nonumalo Nanai Leulumoega Sofara is a chief (matai) and former Member of Parliament in Samoa. He was a member of the Human Rights Protection Party (HRPP) and later the Samoan National Development Party (SNDP).

He became Speaker of the National Legislature when the Human Rights Protection Party first came to power. He was the Speaker from 1982 to 1987. Nonumalo then went on to join the SNDP. He was also a strong opponent of the introduction of universal suffrage, and actively sought to have the act repealed.

Aiono was married to the late Mano Eni Le Mamea Matatumua Ata Sofara, sister of two other Samoan parliamentarians, Laulu Fetauimalemau Mata'afa and Matatumua Maimoana.
