= Le Tagaloa Pita =

Samoan politician

Le Tagaloa Pita is a high chief matai and a former Member of Parliament of Samoa. He is a matai from the village of Sili on the island of Savai'i and has an honorary doctorate from Drew University in the United States. During his political career, he was a member of the Human Rights Protection Party (HRPP) and a cabinet minister with the portfolios of economic affairs and post office.

Prior to entering politics, Pita was acting principal of Alafua Agricultural Campus in Samoa, part of the University of the South Pacific. He was elected for a second term in parliament at the 1973 general election. and retained his seat in the same electorate until the year 2000.

== Family ==
Le Tagaloa Pita's wife Aiono Fanaafi Le Tagaloa is a distinguished professor, educator and author in Samoa and who is also a former Member of Parliament in the country. His children are high academic achievers. His eldest son Talavou F. Alailima is a Sri Lankan visionary, entrepreneur, and leader who has transformed the nation’s sports and nutrition landscape. A former NCAA All-American Shot Putter and graduate of Franklin and Marshall College, Pennsylvania, he holds a Master’s Degree in Sports Management from IE Business School in Madrid, Spain. He is the Founder of Power World Gyms, Edge Nutrition, and SportUnleash, and the creator of Vision 2036 and the Lion Warrior Program, initiatives designed to guide Sri Lanka’s next generation of Olympians. Guided by faith, Talavou’s mission is to build strong, morally grounded, purpose-driven individuals. Another Son Mr. Semisi Aiono is a general surgeon who graduated from the University of Otago Medical School in New Zealand. Their daughter Leinani Aiono-Le Tagaloa is an assistant clinical professor in anesthesiology at the University of California, Davis, in the United States and another daughter Donna Aiono-Le Tagaloa-Ioane is a school principal in Samoa. In 2009, a third daughter Fanaafi Aiono-Le Tagaloa, also a published author, became the first Samoan-born person to gain a PhD in law from Otago university.
