= Vaʻai Kolone =

4th Prime Minister of Western Samoa

The Honourable Vaʻai Kolone

4th Prime Minister of Western Samoa
- In office 30 December 1985 – 8 April 1988
- O le Ao o le Malo: Malietoa Tanumafili II
- Deputy: Tupuola Efi
- Preceded by: Tofilau Eti Alesana
- Succeeded by: Tofilau Eti Alesana
- In office 13 April 1982 – 18 September 1982
- O le Ao o le Malo: Malietoa Tanumafili II
- Preceded by: Tupuola Efi
- Succeeded by: Tupuola Efi

2nd Minister of Foreign Affairs
- In office 30 December 1985 – 8 April 1988
- Preceded by: Tofilau Eti Alesana
- Succeeded by: Tofilau Eti Alesana
- In office 13 April 1982 – 18 September 1982
- Preceded by: Tupuola Efi
- Succeeded by: Tupuola Efi

Member of the Samoan Parliament; for Vaisigano No. 1
- In office February 1983 – 2 March 2001
- Preceded by: Vacant
- Succeeded by: Masoe Filisi
- In office 25 February 1967 – 18 September 1982
- Preceded by: Tupuola Efi
- Succeeded by: Vacant

Personal details
- Born: 11 November 1911 Vaisala, Savaiʻi, German Samoa
- Died: 20 April 2001 (aged 89) Apia, Samoa
- Party: Human Rights Protection Party

Vaʻai Kolone (11 November 1911 – 20 April 2001) was the fourth prime minister of Samoa and a founder of the Human Rights Protection Party (HRPP) in Samoa. He served as prime minister twice, first between 13 April and 18 September 1982, and then from 30 December 1985 until 8 April 1988.

== Biography ==
He was from Vaisala village on Savai'i island in the political district of Vaisigano.

Kolone was first elected to parliament, the Legislative Assembly of Samoa, in 1967 representing the electorate of Vaisigano No. 1. In 1979, together with Tofilau Eti Alesana he founded the Human Rights Protection Party to oppose the government of Tupuola Efi. The HRPP won 24 seats in the 1982 election, and Kolone was appointed prime minister. However, an election petition stripped him of his seat shortly afterwards due to bribery charges and he was forced to resign. The party would go on to rule Samoa until 2021. Tupuola Efi was appointed prime minister and served until Kolone regained his seat in the subsequent by-election. In the meantime Tofilau Eti Alesana had been elected leader of the HRPP and served as prime minister for the rest of the parliamentary term.

Kolone resigned from the HRPP after failing to regain the party leadership after the 1985 election. However, in late 1985 11 HRPP Members of Parliament defected to form a coalition government with the then-opposition Christian Democratic Party. Kolone was elected prime minister on 30 December, with Efi as his deputy. The coalition was later formalised as the Samoan National Development Party. He subsequently led the SNDP in the 1991 election, gaining 14 seats.

His sons Va'ai Papu Vailupe and Asiata Sale'imoa Va'ai also became members of Parliament.

Legislative Assembly of Samoa
Preceded by Tupuola Efi	Member of Parliament for Vaisigano No. 1; 1967–1982	Vacant
Vacant	Member of Parliament for Vaisigano No. 1; 1983–2001	Succeeded by Masoe Filisi
Political offices
Preceded by Tupuola Efi	Prime Minister of Western Samoa; 1982	Succeeded by Tupuola Efi
Preceded by Tofilau Eti Alesana	Prime Minister of Western Samoa; 1985–1988	Succeeded by Tofilau Eti Alesana
Party political offices
New political party	Leader of the Human Rights Protection Party; 1979–1982	Succeeded by Tofilau Eti Alesana
