= Tuamasaga =

Coordinates: 13°55′S 171°48′W

- District
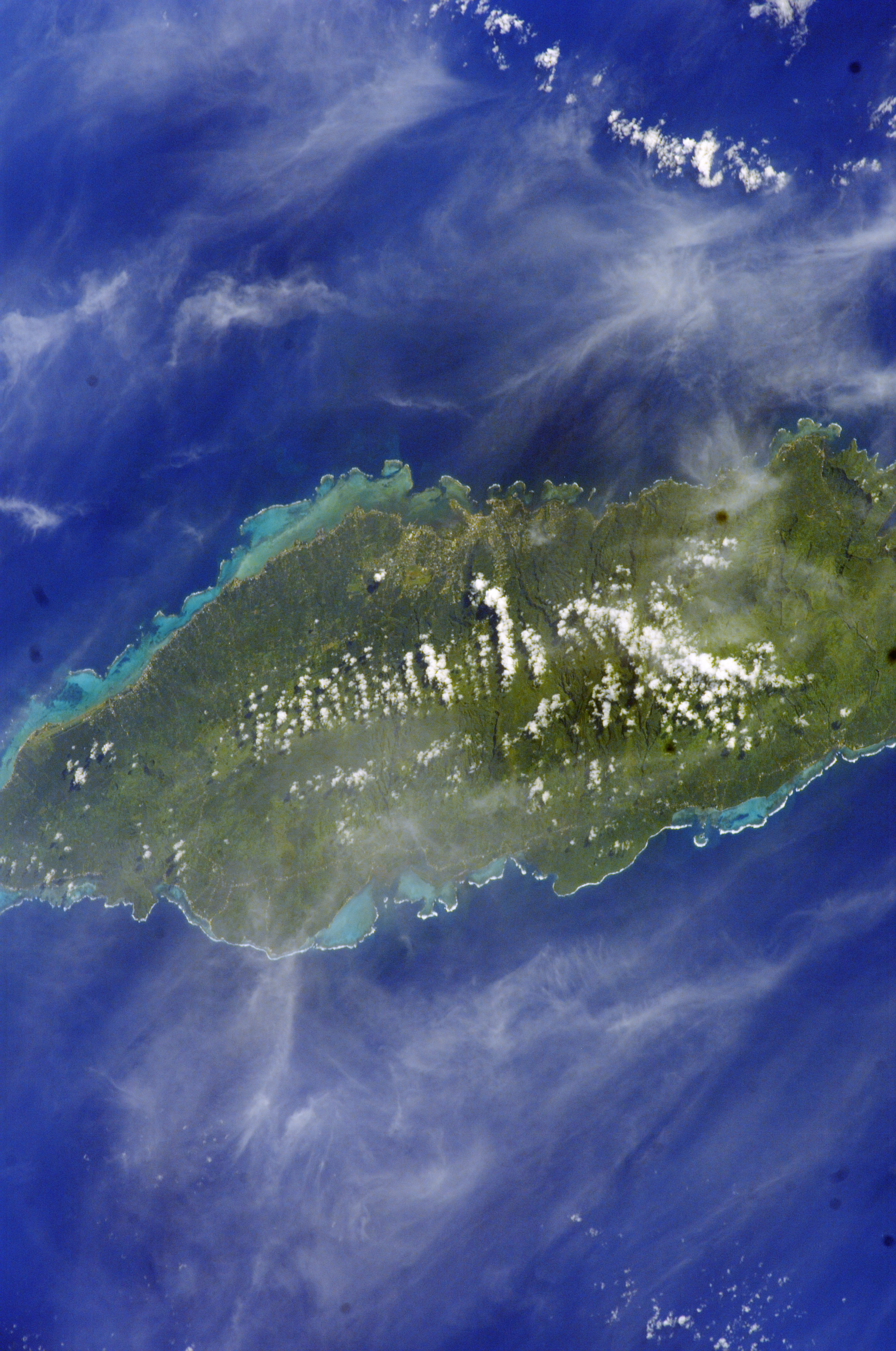
- Satellite image of Upolu island showing Tuamasaga district. (NASA photo, 2006

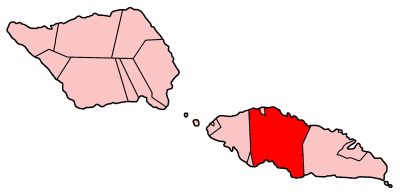
- Map of Samoa showing Tuamasaga district
- Country: Samoa

Population (2016)
  - Total: 95,907
- Time zone: +13

Tuamāsaga is a district of Samoa, with a population (2016 census) of 95,907. This makes it the most populous district in Samoa. The geographic area of Tuamasaga covers the central part of Upolu island, and includes the capital, Apia.

== History and politics ==
=== Malie & the Malietoa ===
The paramount matai title of Tuamasaga is the Malietoa title. Led by Auimatagi, Sa Malietoa and the nine senior orators of Malie are responsible for the election of the Malietoa titleholder at Niuʻula in Malie. Given that the district of Aiga-i-le-Tai (Manono and Apolima) and the district of Faʻasaleleaga on Savaiʻi are two key footholds of the Aiga Sa Malietoa (Malietoa clan), Malie often consults with Manono (capital of Aiga-i-le-Tai) and Safotulafai (capital of Faʻasaleleaga) in the election of the Malietoa.

The village of Malie is the seat of the Malietoa.

At a national level, the Malietoa title is one of the four Tama-a-Aiga (noble families) titles. Apia, the nation's capital, is situated in the north of the district. The national parliament also sits at Mulinuʻu to the west of Apia, and the main seaport is situated at Matautu to the north of Apia around the shores of Apia harbour.

Afega, Safata and the pāpā titles

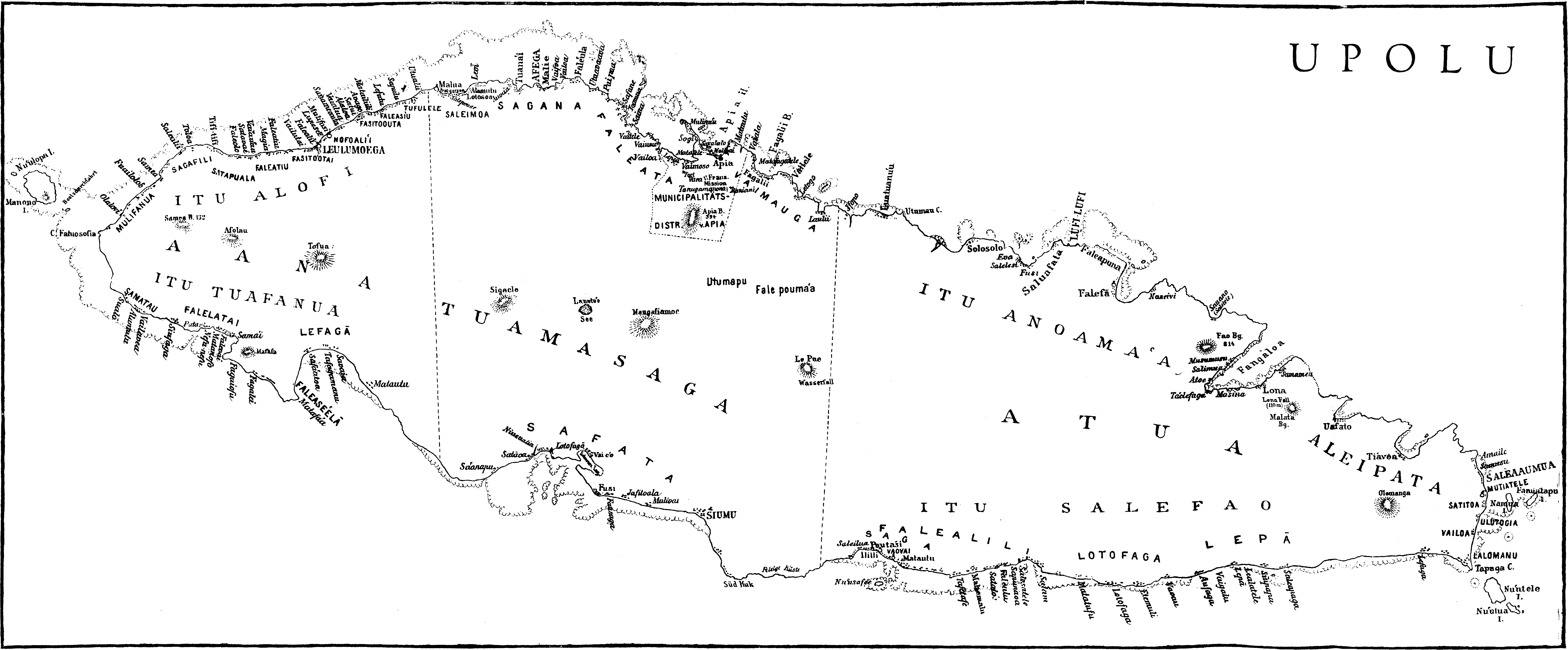
Tuamasaga district on the map of 1924

The paramount pāpā titles of Tuamasaga are Gatoaitele and Vaetamasoalii. Afega is the seat of Gatoaitele. Once a decision is made, the village of Afega, through the chiefs Fata and Maulolo, must lead the bestowal process on behalf of the Fale Tuamasaga (the parliament of Tuamasaga). Safata is the seat of the Vaetamasoalii pāpā. These pāpā titles are usually bestowed upon the highest matai of Tuamasaga and one of the four Tama-a-Aiga (noble families) of Samoa.

Historically, the Fale Tuamasaga meets at Afega (malae a Vaitoelau) in times of war and at Malie (malae a filemu) in times of peace.

=== Tumua ===
Together with the faleiva of Leulumoega and the faleono of Lufilufi, the lead orators of Malie & Afega (collectively called 'Tuisamau ma Auimatagi') comprise the group of tulafale alii (orator chiefs) who speak on behalf of Upolu on matters of state, the Tumua.

== Archaeology ==
Archaeology in Samoa has uncovered earth mounds and archaeological remains at the village of Vailele in the sub-district of Vaimauga, on the central north coast to the east of Apia.
