= Tofilau Eti Alesana =

5th Prime Minister of Samoa

The Honourable Tofilau Eti Alesana
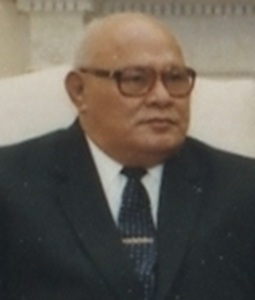
- Alesana in 1992

5th Prime Minister of Samoa
- In office 8 April 1988 – 23 November 1998
- O le Ao o le Malo: Malietoa Tanumafili II
- Deputy: Tuila'epa Sa'ilele Malielegaoi
- Preceded by: Va'ai Kolone
- Succeeded by: Tuila'epa Sa'ilele Malielegaoi
- In office 31 December 1982 – 30 December 1985
- O le Ao o le Malo: Malietoa Tanumafili II
- Preceded by: Tupuola Efi
- Succeeded by: Va'ai Kolone

4th Minister of Foreign Affairs
- In office 8 April 1988 – 23 November 1998
- Preceded by: Va'ai Kolone
- Succeeded by: Tuila'epa Sa'ilele Malielegaoi
- In office 1984 – 30 December 1985
- Preceded by: Lauofo Meti
- Succeeded by: Va'ai Kolone

Minister without Portfolio
- In office 23 November 1998 – 19 March 1999
- Prime Minister: Tuila'epa Sa'ilele Malielegaoi

Personal details
- Born: Aualamalefalelima Alesana; 4 June 1924 Vaitogi, Tutuila, American Samoa
- Died: 19 March 1999 (aged 74) Apia, Samoa
- Resting place: Lalomavala, Savaii
- Party: HRPP
- Spouse: Pitolua Alesana

Tofilau Eti Alesana (born Aualamalefalelima Alesana; 4 June 1924 – 19 March 1999) was a Samoan politician who served as the fifth prime minister of Samoa from 1982 to 1985, and again from 1988 until his resignation in 1998.

== Biography ==
=== Background ===
Alesana was born in Vaitogi, Tutuila, American Samoa into a Samoan upper-class family. At the age of 24, he became a clan chief. Alesana's parents, Alesana James Enoka and Vaoita Iosefa Mala’itai, were pastors in Vaitogi. He was the youngest of twelve children and was given the birth name Aualamalefalelima, which is the traditional salutation of the tulafales of Vaitogi village. He attended schools on Tutuila and Upolu islands. He later joined the New Zealand Defence Force in Western Samoa during World War II, and worked in Fagatogo, American Samoa after the war ended. His parents moved with him to Savaiʻi to be a matai in the village of Lalomalava and Alesana joined Western Samoa politics a few years later.

=== Political career ===
In 1957 he was elected to the legislative council, and in 1958 he became health minister. He helped draft the constitution for the newly independent state of Western Samoa. Alesana helped form the Human Rights Protection Party which won power in 1982. Alesana served as prime minister for the first time from 1982 until 1985 when he was deposed by Parliament with the help of disgruntled members of his own party. He regained control of the party in 1988 and became prime minister. Alesana led the party to almost complete control of the country, with more than a 2/3 majority in the Parliament. In 1997 Alesana's government changed the country's name from Western Samoa to Samoa.

Alesana began to suffer from health problems in the 1990s, finally resigning as Prime Minister in November 1998 but remained a member of Cabinet as Minister Without Portfolio until his death in the capital, Apia. His party would go on to hold power until 2021. Alesana was also Minister of Foreign Affairs of Samoa from 1984 to 1985 and from 1988 to 1998.

== Family ==
Tofilau was born to Samoan upper-class parents, Reverend James Alesana Fai'ivae and Vaoita Iosefa Mala'itai. He was the first of a prominent political family in both Samoas. He was the uncle of former Governor of American Samoa, Tauese Sunia as well as the former U.S. Congressional Representative Fofō Iosefa Fiti Sunia, the former Lt. Governor of American Samoa, Faoa Aitofele Sunia and a second cousin of former American Samoa Congressional representative, Eni Faleomavaega.

His wife was Pitolua Alesana. Alesana's son, Tautua Samoa Party President Va'aelua Eti Alesana, died in 2011.

== Honours ==
Alesana was awarded the Queen Elizabeth II Coronation Medal in 1953, and the New Zealand 1990 Commemoration Medal. On 6 July 1994, he was appointed an Honorary Companion of the Order of Australia (AC), for "eminent service to Australian/Western Samoan relations and to South Pacific multilateral relations".

Legislative Assembly of Samoa
Legislature established	Member of Parliament for Fa'asaleleaga 1; 1962–1967	Succeeded by Luamanuvae Eti
Preceded by Lilomaiava Niko	Member of Parliament for Fa'asaleleaga 1; 1970–1973	Succeeded by Muagututi'a Lavilavi
Preceded by Muagututi'a Lavilavi	Member of Parliament for Fa'asaleleaga 1; 1976–1999	Succeeded by Tofilau Tauvaga
Political offices
Preceded by Tupuola Efi	Prime Minister of Samoa; 1982–1985	Succeeded by Vaʻai Kolone
Preceded by Lauofo Meti	Minister of Foreign Affairs; 1984–1985	Succeeded by Vaʻai Kolone
Preceded by Va‘ai Kolone	Prime Minister of Samoa; 1988–1998	Succeeded by Tuila'epa Sa'ilele Malielegaoi
Preceded by Va‘ai Kolone	Minister of Foreign Affairs; 1988–1998	Succeeded by Tuila'epa Sa'ilele Malielegaoi
Party political offices
Preceded by Va‘ai Kolone	Leader of the Human Rights Protection Party; 1982–1998	Succeeded by Tuila'epa Sa'ilele Malielegaoi
