= Tui Ātua Tupua Tamasese Efi =

O le Ao o le Malo of Samoa from 2007 to 2017

His Highness Le Afioga Tui Ātua Tupua Tamasese Efi
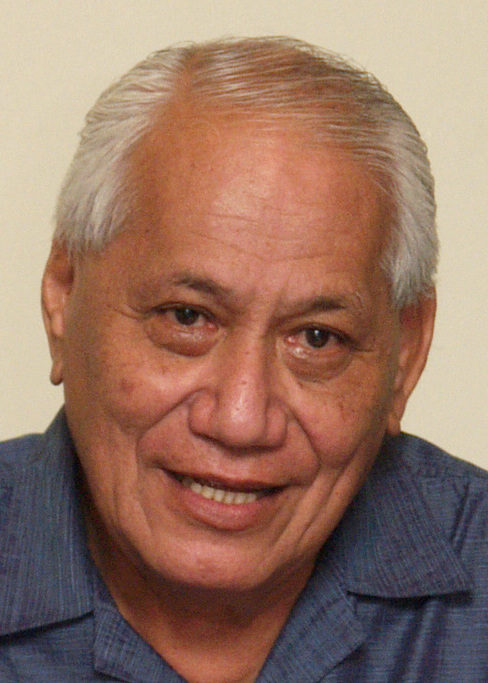
- Tupua in 2006

O le Ao o le Malo of Samoa
- In office 20 June 2007 – 21 July 2017; Acting: 11 May 2007 – 20 June 2007
- Prime Minister: Tuila'epa Sa'ilele Malielegaoi
- Preceded by: Malietoa Tanumafili II
- Succeeded by: Tuimalealiʻifano Vaʻaletoʻa Sualauvi II

3rd Prime Minister of Western Samoa
- In office 18 September 1982 – 31 December 1982
- O le Ao O le Malo: Malietoa Tanumafili II
- Preceded by: Va'ai Kolone
- Succeeded by: Tofilau Eti Alesana
- In office 24 March 1976 – 13 April 1982
- O le Ao O le Malo: Malietoa Tanumafili II
- Preceded by: Lealofi IV (acting)
- Succeeded by: Va'ai Kolone
Other offices
Member of the Council of Deputies
Incumbent
Assumed office 10 January 2025
O le Ao o le Malo	Tuimalealiʻifano Vaʻaletoʻa Sualauvi II
In office 2004 – 20 June 2007
O le Ao o le Malo	Malietoa Tanumafili II
Deputy Prime Minister of Western Samoa
In office 30 December 1985 – 8 April 1988
Prime Minister	Va'ai Kolone
Succeeded by	Tuila'epa Sa'ilele Malielegaoi
1st Minister of Foreign Affairs
In office 18 September 1982 – 31 December 1982
Preceded by	Va'ai Kolone
Succeeded by	Lauofo Meti
In office 24 March 1976 – 13 April 1982
Succeeded by	Va'ai Kolone
Constituency
Member of the Samoan Parliament
In office 26 February 1988 – 2004
Preceded by	Afioga Savea Sione
Succeeded by	Lufilufi Moefaauo
Constituency	Anoama'a East
In office 7 February 1970 – 26 February 1988
Preceded by	Taimalie Meapelo
Succeeded by	Alipia Siaosi
Constituency	Aana Alofi No. 2
In office May 1965 – 25 February 1967
Preceded by	Masoe Tulele
Succeeded by	Va'ai Kolone
Constituency	Vaisigano No. 1

Personal details
- Born: 1 March 1938 (age 88) Motootua, Western Samoa (now Samoa)
- Party: Independent
- Other political affiliations: National Development Party (1988–2003); Christian Democratic Party (1985–1988)
- Spouse: Masiofo Filifilia Imo Tamasese
- Parents: Tupua Tamasese Meaʻole (father); Irene Gustava Noue Nelson (mother)
- Education: Victoria University of Wellington

Tui Ātua Tupua Tamasese Tupuola Tufuga Efi (born 1 March 1938) is a Samoan paramount chief, politician and statesman who served as prime minister of Samoa from 1976 to 1982, and as O le Ao o le Malo (head of state) of Samoa from 2007 to 2017. He is currently a member of the Council of Deputies, having previously sat on the council from 2004 to 2007.

As a paramount chief (tamaʻāiga) and head of the Tupua Tamasese lineage, he heads one of Samoa's two royal families, the Sā Tupua (descendants of Queen Salamasina); he also holds the ancient pāpā title of Tui Ātua (sovereign of Atua).

== Early life and education ==
Tupua was born on 1 March 1938 at Motoʻotua in Samoa. He is the son of Tupua Tamasese Meaʻole (1905–1963), who served as head of state alongside Malietoa Tanumafili II following the independence of Western Samoa in 1962, and Irene Gustava Noue Nelson, of Samoan, Swedish and British descent. He is also a nephew of Tupua Tamasese Lealofi III, a prominent Samoan independence leader, and a cousin of Tupua Tamasese Lealofi IV, who later served as Western Samoa's prime minister during the 1970s.

Tupua attended primary school at the Marist Brothers School at Mulivai in the Samoan capital of Apia. He continued his education at St. Patrick's College in Silverstream, Wellington, New Zealand. He was also educated at Victoria University of Wellington, in New Zealand's capital city.

== Prime Minister of Samoa ==
Tupua began his political career in May 1965, when he was elected to the Legislative Assembly from the Vaisigano No. 1 constituency. He served as Samoa's Minister of Works from 1970 until 1972.

Tupua served as prime minister for two consecutive terms from 1976 to 1982. He also served as deputy prime minister from 1985 to 1988. It was during his second term as prime minister that the Public Service Association went on a general strike in 1981, paralysing the country for several months and paving the way for the opposition Human Rights Protection Party's entry to government in 1982. The party would go on to hold power until 2021.

Tupua became Leader of the Opposition following his Christian Democratic Party's election defeat in 1982. He also headed the Samoan National Development Party. He continued to serve Anoamaʻa East as MP until 2004 when he was appointed to Samoa's Council of Deputies alongside Tuimalealiʻifano Vaʻaletoʻa Sualauvi II.

== Tupua Tamasese title ==
Upon Tupua Tamasese Lealofi IV's death in 1983, the question as to a successor was raised with Tupuola Efi staking his claim. However, this would require ʻĀiga Sā Fenunuivao agreeing to his appointment. Salani agreed, however Falefa and Lufilufi opposed it. Tupuola Efi proceeded without the unanimous support of ʻĀiga Sā Fenunuivao. On the morning of his installation ceremony, the nation's public broadcaster, Radio 2AP, read an announcement from the family's matua, Moeono Alaiʻasā Kolio, notifying the country that both Falefa and Lufilufi had not sanctioned Tufuga Efi's ascension to the title, nullifying the candidate's grasp for the title once again.

In 1986, Tupuola Efi again sought out ʻĀiga Sā Fenunuivao's blessing. Falefa and Lufilufi eventually agreed to Tupuola Tufuga Efi's ascension to the titles after the ailing Moeono granted his approval. In November 1986, ʻĀiga Sā Fenunuivao, ʻĀiga o Mavaega and ʻĀiga Sā Tuala jointly conferred the title on Tupuola Efi in an installation ceremony at Vaimoso jointly registering the title under their family names. This uneasy agreement to joint conferral would later be challenged in Samoa's Land and Titles Court.

The following year, the court ruled that the right of conferral of the Tupua Tamasese title belonged exclusively to ʻĀiga Sā Fenunuivao of Falefa and Salani.

== O le Ao o le Malo ==
Following the death of Malietoa Tanumafili II on 11 May 2007, Tupua and Tuimalealiʻifano performed the functions of the head of state in an acting capacity, as members of the Council of Deputies. Tupua was elected head of state on 16 June 2007. His was the only nomination put forth in Samoa's Fono (parliament) and thus the decision was unanimous. His election was welcomed by many Samoans both in Samoa and abroad. He was sworn into office on 20 June 2007.

He was re-elected in July 2012 by a majority vote of the Legislative Assembly. However, he was not re-appointed as of 20 July 2017 after a controversial move by then-prime minister Tuilaʻepa Saʻilele Malielegaoi, which saw a legislative assembly vote of 23 to 15. This was after an initial vote that was taken, which saw the tamaʻāiga gain the majority of support from the ruling HRPP caucus. This was seen as but a mere formality and that Tui Ātua would again be elected to office to serve as Head of State. However, owing to decades of tension with Tuilaʻepa, Tui Ātua was instead replaced in a backroom vote by Tuimalealiʻifano.

== Later political career ==
In December 2024 he was reappointed to the Council of Deputies. He formally took his seat on the council in January 2025.

== Academia ==
Tupua held a number of academic positions during and after his political career as an MP and prime minister.

Tupua served as an adjunct professor for Te Whare Wananga o Awanuiarangi in New Zealand. He later became an associate member of the Matahauariki Institute at Waikato University. He was a PhD examiner at Australian National University in Canberra for Pacific and Samoan history.

Tupua was a resident scholar of the Pacific Studies Centre of the Australian National University and the Macmillan Brown Centre for Pacific Studies at University of Canterbury in New Zealand.

Tupua helped to begin excavations at Samoa's important Pulemelei Mound archaeological site. Samoans, under Tupua Tamasese, carried out a ceremony to honour Thor Heyerdahl for his contributions to Polynesia and the Pulemelei Mound excavations in 2003.

In late 2007 Tupua established an overseas boarding school scholarship to St. Patrick's College, Silverstream, which allows one student per year to live and be schooled in New Zealand for all their college years, beginning in 2008.

Tupua was awarded an honorary doctorate by St Andrew's University in 2019.

== Publications ==
Tupua wrote three books, and articles in scholarly journals and publications.

== Honours ==
In July 2008, he was made a Knight Grand Cross with Collar of the Order of the Crown of Tonga, while in Tonga for the coronation of King George Tupou V.

He was awarded the Order of Merit of Samoa in the 2023 Samoa Honours and Awards.

== Personal life ==
Tupua is married to Masiofo Filifilia Imo, who is also known as Masiofo Filifilia Tamasese.

== Ancestry ==
Tupua Tamasese family tree

Muagututiʻa	Fenunuivao
Tupua Fuiavalili	Toelupetu
Tafaʻifa Galumalemana	Galuegapapa
Nofoasaefa
Maeaeafe
Tupua Leasiolagi; Moegagogo	Taʻeleumete
Tupua Tamasese; Titimaea (1830–1891)	Leafinealiʻi
Tupua Tamasese; Lealofiaʻana I (d. 1915)	Vaʻaiga ʻAsi
Tupua Tamasese; Lealofiaʻana II (d. 1918)	Tupua Tamasese; Lealofiaʻana III (1901–1929)	Tupua Tamasese; Meaʻole (1905–1963)
Tupua Tamasese; Lealofiaʻana IV (1922–1983)	Tupua Tamasese; Tufuga Efi (b. 1938)

Notes:
- Morgan A. Tuimalealiʻifano (2006). O tama a ʻāiga: the politics of succession to Sāmoa's paramount titles. editorips@usp.ac.fj. p. 28. ISBN 9820203775.

== See also ==
- Faʻamatai, the chiefly system of Samoa
- Legislative Assembly of Samoa

Legislative Assembly of Samoa
Preceded by Masoe Tulele	Member of Parliament for Vaisigano No. 1; 1965–1967	Succeeded by Vaʻai Kolone
Preceded by Taimalie Meapelo	Member of Parliament for Aana Alofi No. 2; 1970–1988	Succeeded by Alipia Siaosi
Preceded by Afioga Savea Sione	Member of Parliament for Anoama'a East; 1988–2004	Succeeded by Lufilufi Moefaauo
Political offices
Preceded by Tupua Tamasese Lealofi IV	Prime Minister of Western Samoa; 1976–1982	Succeeded by Vaʻai Kolone
Preceded by Vaʻai Kolone	Prime Minister of Western Samoa; 1982	Succeeded by Tofilau Eti Alesana
Preceded by Tofilau Eti Alesana	Leader of the Opposition; 1988–2001	Succeeded by Asiata Sale'imoa Va'ai
Preceded by Malietoa Tanumafili II	O le Ao o le Malo of Samoa; 2007–2017	Succeeded by Tuimalealiʻifano Vaʻaletoʻa Sualauvi II
Party political offices
New political party	Leader of the Christian Democratic Party; 1985–1988	Party Dissolved
New political party	Leader of the Samoan National Development Party; 1988–2001	Succeeded by Le Mamea Ropati
Regnal titles
Preceded by Tupua Tamasese Lealofi IV	Tupua Tamasese; 1983–present	Incumbent
