= List of members of the Legislative Assembly of Western Samoa (1961–1964) =

Members of the Legislative Assembly of Western Samoa were elected on 4 February 1961. The 46 members consisted of 41 Samoans elected in single-member constituency and five Europeans elected from a nationwide constituency.

== List of members ==
Constituency	Member	Notes
Aana Alofi No. 1	Leaupepe Faatoto	
Aana Alofi No. 2	Pilia'e Iuliano	
Aana Alofi No. 3	Letelemaana Tala	
Aiga i le Tai	Mafua Tamoto	
Alataua West	Taua'iaufa'i Fuifui	
Aleipata Itupa i Lalo	Amoa Tausilia	Speaker
Aleipata Itupa i Luga	Sagapolutele Pose	
Anoamaa East	Iuli Veni	
Anoamaa West	Tagaloa Siaosi	
European	Fred Betham	Minister for Finance
European	Frank Nelson	Minister for Works and Transport
European	Peter Plowman	
European	Arno Max Gurau	Gurau died in June 1961
European	Hans Joachim Keil II	
Faasaleleaga No. 1	Magele Ate	
Faasaleleaga No. 2	Tuilagi Simi	Deputy Speaker
Faasaleleaga No. 3	Segi Lafa	
Faasaleleaga No. 4	Peseta Uisa	
Falealili	Tuatagaloa Leutele Te'o	Minister for Education
Falealupo	Foa'imea Muava'a	
Faleata East	Vaitagutu Siaki	
Faleata West	Feaunati Panapa	
Falelatai & Samatau	Faalavaau Galu	Minister for Post Office, Radio & Broadcasting
Gagaemauga No. 1	Tevaga Paletasala	
Gagaemauga No. 2	Malotutoatasi Sauni Iiga Kuresa	
Gagaemauga No. 3	Leota Lu	
Gagaifomauga No. 1	Peseta Seko	
Gagaifomauga No. 2	Tu'u Lolesio	
Gagaifomauga No. 3	Laauli Paoa	
Lefaga & Faleseela	Tuaopepe Taula Tame	
Lepa	Fatialofa Frederick Makisua	
Lotofaga	Fiame Mata'afa	Prime Minister
Palauli East	Afoafouvale Misimoa	
Palauli le Falefa	Fepuleai Mani	
Palauli West	Faiumu Apete	
Safata	Anapu Solofa	Minister for Justice. Died in 1963
Sagaga le Falefa	Laufili Tusani Time	
Sagaga le Usoga	Leapaitausiliilenuu Sefo	
Salega	To'omata Lilomaiava Tua	Minister for Land
Satupaitea	Asiata Lagolago	Minister for Agriculture
Siumu	Tofaeono Taulima	
Vaa o Fonoti	Ulualofaiga Talamaivao	
Vaimauga East	Leniu Fanene Avaona	
Vaimauga West	Tofaeono Muliaga	
Vaisigano East No. 1	Tufuga Fatu	Minister for Health
Vaisigano East No. 2	Lesatele Rapi	
Source: Parliament of Samoa
