= List of members of the Legislative Assembly of Western Samoa (1964–1967) =

Members of the Legislative Assembly of Western Samoa were elected on 4 April 1964. The 47 members consisted of 45 Samoans elected in one- or two-member constituency and two 'individual voters' elected from a nationwide constituency.

== List of members ==
Constituency	Member	Notes
A'ana Alofi No. 1	Apulu Moeva	
A'ana Alofi No. 1	Aiono Luluali'i	
A'ana Alofi No. 2	Pilia'e Iuliano	
A'ana Alofi No. 3	Vaili Tatupu	
Aiga-i-le-Tai	Lesa Anisi	
Alataua West	Folasa Maauga	
Aleipata Itupa-i-Lalo	Amoa Tausilia	Speaker
Aleipata Itupa-i-Luga	Fuataga Penita	
Anoamaa East	Leutele Poutoa	
Anoamaa West	Fulu Misiata	
Fa'asaleleaga No. 1	Magele Ate	Deputy Speaker
Fa'asaleleaga No. 1	Tofilau Lealofi	
Fa'asaleleaga No. 2	Papali'i Poumau	Minister for Education
Fa'asaleleaga No. 3	Toleafoa Talitimu	
Fa'asaleleaga No. 4	I'iga Kalapu	
Falealili	Tuatagaloa Leutele Te'o	Minister for Justice
Falealili	Fuimaono Faafete	
Falealupo	Seumanutafa Maumea	
Faleata East	Vaitagutu Siaki	
Faleata West	Ulu Lui	
Falelatai & Samatau	Faalavaau Galu	Minister for Post Office, Radio & Broadcasting
Gaga'emauga No. 1	Tuala Paulo	
Gaga'emauga No. 2	Malotutoatasi Sauni Iiga Kuresa	
Gaga'emauga No. 3	Galuvao Farani	
Gaga'ifomauga No. 1	Tapusoa Peni	
Gaga'ifomauga No. 2	Amituanai Vili	
Gaga'ifomauga No. 3	Polataivao Fosi	
Individual voters	Fred Betham	Minister for Finance
Individual voters	Frank Nelson	Minister for Works, Transport Licensing, Marine and Civil Aviation. Died in early 1967.
Lefaga & Falese'ela	Tuaopepe Taula Tame	
Lepa	Auelua Filipo	
Lotofaga	Fiame Mata'afa	Prime Minister
Palauli East	Afoafouvale Misimoa	
Palauli-le-Falefa	Maposua Malo	
Palauli West	Faatupuinati Faavae	
Safata	Tuia Iosefa	
Sagaga-le-Falefa	Laufili Tusani Time	Minister for Agriculture
Sagaga-le-Usoga	Savea Toso	
Salega	To'omata Lilomaiava Tua	Minister for Land & Land Registry
Satupa'itea	Asiata Lagolago	
Siumu	Mano Togamau	
Va'a-o-Fonoti	Ulualofaiga Talamaivao	Minister for Health
Vaimauga East	Leniu Fanene Avaona	
Vaimauga West	Tofaeono Muliaga	
Vaimauga West	Toomalatai Pekina	
Vaisigano East No. 1	Masoe Tulele	
Vaisigano East No. 2	Lesatele Rapi	
Source: Parliament of Samoa Samoa Election Results Database
