= List of members of the Legislative Assembly of Western Samoa (1957–1961) =

Members of the Legislative Assembly of Western Samoa were elected on 15 November 1957. The 46 members consisted of 41 Samoans elected in single-member constituency and five Europeans elected from a nationwide constituency.

== List of members ==
Constituency	Member	Notes
A'ana Alofi No. 1	Aiono Urima	
A'ana Alofi No. 2	Pilia'e Iuliano	
A'ana Alofi No. 3	Saipaia Galumalemana Uepa	
Aiga-i-le-Tai	Leiataua Samuelu	
Alataua West	Usu To'avalu	
Aleipata Itupa-i-Lalo	Amoa Tausilia	
Aleipata Itupa-i-Luga	Sagapolutele Pose	
Anoamaa East	Iuli Veni	
Anoamaa West	Pulepule Matu'u	
European	Fred Betham	
European	Hans Joachim Keil II	
European	Frank Nelson	
European	Eugene Paul	
European	Peter Plowman	
Fa'asaleleaga No. 1	Luamanuvae Eti Alesana	
Fa'asaleleaga No. 2	Papali'i Pesamino	
Fa'asaleleaga No. 3	Ufagalilo Fa'atafa	
Fa'asaleleaga No. 4	Vui Fale	
Falealili	Tuatagaloa Leutele Te'o	
Falealupo	Soifua Solia Gese	
Faleata East	Matai'a Europa	
Faleata West	Seiuli Tolova'a Iakopo	
Falelatai & Samatau	Faalavaau Galu	
Gaga'emauga No. 1	Tevaga Paletasala	
Gaga'emauga No. 2	Tuala Tiaina	
Gaga'emauga No. 3	Seuamuli Etimani	
Gaga'ifomauga No. 1	Peseta Seko	
Gaga'ifomauga No. 2	Tugaga Isa'aka	
Gaga'ifomauga No. 3	Leasi Avaula	
Lefaga & Faleseela	Fenunuti Tauafua	
Lepa	Fatialofa Faimalo	
Lotofaga	Fiame Mata'afa	
Palauli East	Tualaulelei Mauri	
Palauli-le-Falefa	Maposua Seilala	
Palauli West	Tuato Poto	
Safata	Anapu Solofa	
Sagaga-le-Falefa	Luatua Mata'ese	
Sagaga-le-Usoga	Luafatasaga Su'e Taule'alo	
Salega	To'omata Lilomaiava Tua	
Satupa'itea	Asiata Lagolago	
Siumu	Toloafa Lafaele	
Va'a-o-Fonoti	Ulualofaiga Talamaivao	
Vaimauga East	Ulumalautea Papali'i	
Vaimauga West	Tofaeono Muliaga	
Vaisigano No. 1	Tufuga Fatu	
Vaisigano No. 2	Lesatele Rapi	
Speaker	Luafatasaga Kalapu	
Official members	L.M. Cook	Financial Secretary
Official members	H.A. Levestam	Secretary
Official members	C.E.J. Paul	Attorney-General
Source: Parliament of Samoa, Meleisea & Meleisea
