= List of members of the Legislative Assembly of Western Samoa (1970–1973) =

Members of the Legislative Assembly of Western Samoa were elected on 7 February 1970. The 47 members consisted of 45 Samoans elected in one or two-member constituency and two 'individual voters' elected from a nationwide constituency.

== List of members ==
Constituency	Member	Notes
A'ana Alofi No. 1	Faigamaa Sapa	
A'ana Alofi No. 1	Tofa Siaosi	Minister for Finance
A'ana Alofi No. 2	Tufuga Efi	Minister for Works and Transport
A'ana Alofi No. 3	Vaili Tatupu	
Aiga-i-le-Tai	Tauti Fuatau	
Alataua West	Aunei Talaivela	
Aleipata Itupa-i-Lalo	Amoa Tausilia	Minister for Education (until 1971), Minister of Justice (from 1971)
Aleipata Itupa-i-Luga	Fuataga Penita	
Anoamaa East	Tupua Tamasese	Prime Minister
Anoamaa West	Leota Leuluaiali'i Ituau Ale	
Fa'asaleleaga No. 1	Tofilau Eti Alesana	
Fa'asaleleaga No. 1	Magele Ate	
Fa'asaleleaga No. 2	Leilua Iuliano	
Fa'asaleleaga No. 3	Su'a Aloese	
Fa'asaleleaga No. 4	Vui Pipo	
Falealili	Fuimaono Moasope	Minister for Health (until 1971), Minister for the Post Office, Radio and Broadcasting (from 1971)
Falealili	Fuimaono Mimio	
Falealupo	Aeau Taulupoo	
Faleata East	Mataia Europa	
Faleata West	Ulugia Suivai	
Falelatai & Samatau	Faalavaau Galu	
Gaga'emauga No. 1	Tuala Paulo	Minister of Justice (until 1971), Minister for Education (from 1971)
Gaga'emauga No. 2	Lofipo Ropati	
Gaga'emauga No. 3	Tiatia Lokeni	
Gaga'ifomauga No. 1	Utumapu Saunoa	
Gaga'ifomauga No. 2	Leaumoana Fereti	
Gaga'ifomauga No. 3	Polataivao Fosi	Minister for Land and Land Registry
Individual Voters	Fred Betham	Resigned in 1971. Sam Saili won the resulting by-election
Individual Voters	Thomas Ott	
Lefaga & Falease'ela	Tuaopepe Tame	
Lepa	Fatialofa Momo'e	Minister for the Post Office, Radio and Broadcasting (until 1971)
Lotofaga	Fiame Mata'afa	
Palauli East	Tupua Siliva	
Palauli-le-Falefa	Le Tagaloa Pita	
Palauli West	Faimaala Filipo	
Safata	Taoa Fa'aoloviti	
Sagaga-le-Falefa	Laufili Time	
Sagaga-le-Usoga	Seiuli Taulafo	
Salega	To'omata Lilomaiava Tua	Tua died shortly after the election. He was replaced by Tui Samuelu.
Satupa'itea	Asiata Lagolago	
Siumu	Mano Togamau	
Va'a-o-Fonoti	Ulualofaiga Talamaivao	Talamaivao died in 1971
Vaimauga East	Ulumalautea Sione	
Vaimauga West	Asi Leavasa	Minister of Agriculture
Vaimauga West	Seumanutafa Moepogai	
Vaisigano No. 1	Va'ai Kolone	Minister of Health (from 1971)
Vaisigano No. 2	Lesatele Rapi	
Source: Samoa Election Results Database
