= List of members of the Legislative Assembly of Western Samoa (1967–1970) =

Members of the Legislative Assembly of Western Samoa were elected on 25 February 1967. The 47 members consisted of 45 Samoans elected in one or two-member constituency and two 'individual voters' elected from a nationwide constituency.

== List of members ==
Constituency	Member	Notes
A'ana Alofi No. 1	Faigamaa Sapa	
A'ana Alofi No. 1	Leaupepe Fiti	
A'ana Alofi No. 2	Taimalie Meapelo	
A'ana Alofi No. 3	Afamasaga Maua	
Aiga-i-le-Tai	Taupau Pale	
Alataua West	Siilata Milo Maiava Leo	
Aleipata Itupa-i-Lalo	Amoa Tausilia	
Aleipata Itupa-i-Luga	Fuataga Penita	
Anoamaa East	Leutele Poutoa	
Anoamaa West	Leota To'omata Siaki	
Fa'asaleleaga No. 1	Magele Ate	Speaker
Fa'asaleleaga No. 1	Luamanuavae Eti	Minister for Health
Fa'asaleleaga No. 2	Leilua Iuliano	
Fa'asaleleaga No. 3	Su'a Aloese	
Fa'asaleleaga No. 4	I'iga Kalapu	
Falealili	Fuimaono Moasope	
Falealili	Tuatagaloa Leutele Te'o	
Falealupo	Lamositele Tautala	
Faleata East	Letele-Taneolevo Siaosi	
Faleata West	Ulugia Suivai	
Falelatai & Samatau	Faalavaau Galu	Minister for Post Office, Radio & Broadcasting
Gaga'emauga No. 1	Tuala Paulo	Deputy Speaker
Gaga'emauga No. 2	Semau Peleseuma	
Gaga'emauga No. 3	Seuamuli Etimani	
Gaga'ifomauga No. 1	Lavea Leitupo	
Gaga'ifomauga No. 2	Taulealeausumai Taulauniu	
Gaga'ifomauga No. 3	Polataivao Fosi	
Individual voters	Fred Betham	Minister for Finance
Individual voters	Peter Paul	
Lefaga & Falese'ela	Tuaopepe Taula Tame	Minister for Education
Lepa	Fatialofa Momo'e	
Lotofaga	Fiame Mata'afa	Prime Minister
Palauli East	Mataafā Samaeli	
Palauli-le-Falefa	Maposua Malo	
Palauli West	Tuitolovaa Epati	
Safata	Taoa Faaolotoi	
Sagaga-le-Falefa	Laufili Tusani Time	Minister for Agriculture
Sagaga-le-Usoga	Saena Sa'imoa	
Salega	To'omata Lilomaiava Tua	Minister for Land & Land Registry
Satupa'itea	Asiata Lagolago	
Siumu	Tofaeono Taulima	
Va'a-o-Fonoti	Ulualofaiga Talamaivao	Minister for Justice
Vaimauga East	Ulumalautea Sione	
Vaimauga West	Tofaeono Muliaga	
Vaimauga West	Asi Leulua'ialii Alekana	
Vaisigano No. 1	Va'ai Kolone	
Vaisigano No. 2	Lesatele Rapi	Minister for Works and Transport
Source: Parliament of Samoa
