= Fonoti Ioane =

Samoan politician

Member for Health
- In office 1956–1957
- Succeeded by: Luamanuvae Eti

Member for Agriculture
- In office 1954–1956
- Succeeded by: To'omata Lilomaiava Tua

Member of the Legislative Assembly
- In office 1948–1951, 1954–1957
- Constituency: Atua

Personal details
- Born: 17 February 1901
- Died: 9 October 1974 (aged 73)

Fonoti Matautia Ioane (John) Brown (17 February 1901 – 9 October 1974) was a Western Samoan chief, businessman and politician. He was a member of the Legislative Assembly in two spells between 1948 and 1957, and held the portfolios of Agriculture and Health.

== Biography ==
Born in 1901, Ioane was educated at the Marist Brothers school between 1908 and 1913. He worked as a salesman for Burns Philp and Westbrook before setting up his own business. He owned a bakery in Matatufu, ran a successful plantation in Lotofaga and owned cattle, as well as setting up Samoa Traders and J.B. Fonoti. In the 1940s he was described as the only independent Samoan merchant in Apia. In 1939 he was a claimant to the Mata'afa title, but lost it to Fiame Faumuina.

A member of the Fono of Faipule, he served as its president between 1939 and 1947. In 1948 he was elected to the new Legislative Assembly. Although he lost his seat in 1951, he returned to the Legislative Assembly following the 1954 elections, after which he joined the Executive Council and was given the Agriculture portfolio. In 1956 the Executive Council was reorganised and he became member for Health.

Ioane retired from politics due to ill health prior to the 1957 elections. In 1959 he was appointed a director of the new Bank of Western Samoa. However, he returned to politics to contest the 1964 elections, running against incumbent Prime Minister Fiame Mataafa. He lost by 60 votes to 26.

Ioane died in October 1974.
