= List of members of the Legislative Assembly of Western Samoa (1976–1979) =

Members of the Legislative Assembly of Western Samoa were elected on 21 February 1976. The 47 members consisted of 45 Samoans elected in one or two-member constituency and two 'individual voters' elected from a nationwide constituency.

== List of members ==
Constituency	Member	Notes
A'ana Alofi No. 1	Apulu Opeloge	
A'ana Alofi No. 1	Le'aupepetele Taoipu	
A'ana Alofi No. 2	Tufuga Efi	
A'ana Alofi No. 3	Tagoiaega Pologa	
Aiga-i-le-Tai	Leiataua Iosefa	
Alataua West	Aiolupotea Faiva	
Aleipata Itupa-i-Lalo	Letiu Tamatoa	
Aleipata Itupa-i-Luga	Tiatia Tu'iuli	
Anoamaa East	Tupua Tamasese	Tamasese resigned shortly after the elections
Anoamaa West	Leota Leuluaiali'i Ituau Ale	
Fa'asaleleaga No. 1	Lilomaiava Niko	
Fa'asaleleaga No. 1	Tofilau Eti Alesana	
Fa'asaleleaga No. 2	Asi Eikeni	
Fa'asaleleaga No. 3	Unasa Ioane	
Fa'asaleleaga No. 4	I'iga Suafole	
Falealili	Fuimaono Mimio	
Falealili	Te'o Fetu	
Falealupo	Lamusitele Sio	
Faleata East	Manuleleua Fouvale	
Faleata West	Ulugia Nofoa'iga	
Falelatai & Samatau	Aumua Ioane	
Gaga'emauga No. 1	Sala Suivai	
Gaga'emauga No. 2	Semau Peleseuma	
Gaga'emauga No. 3	Seuamuli Kurene	
Gaga'ifomauga No. 1	Timu Kolio	
Gaga'ifomauga No. 2	Tugaga Maulalo	
Gaga'ifomauga No. 3	Polata'ivao Fosi	
Individual Voters	Sam Saili	
Individual Voters	Sina Annandale	
Lefaga & Falease'ela	Vaafusuaga Poutoa	
Lepa	Fatialofa Momo'e	
Lotofaga	Sitagata Liaina	
Palauli East	Lagaaia Faamaga	
Palauli-le-Falefa	Mapuilesua Malo	
Palauli West	Vaovasamanaia Filipo	
Safata	Muliagatele Vena	
Sagaga-le-Falefa	Luatuanuu Aitaua	
Sagaga-le-Usoga	Taliaoa Maoama	
Salega	Tuisalega Semu	
Satupa'itea	Tuimaseve Faasalafa	
Siumu	Mano Togamau	Togamau died in 1978
Va'a-o-Fonoti	Ulualofaiga Talamaivao Niko	
Vaimauga East	To'ailoa Siaosi	
Vaimauga West	Toomalatai Siaki II	
Vaimauga West	Tofaeono Tile	
Vaisigano No. 1	Va'ai Kolone	
Vaisigano No. 2	Lesatele Rapi	
Source: Samoa Election Results Database
