= 1960 Western Samoan Constitutional Assembly election =

Constitutional Assembly elections were held in Western Samoa on 23 July 1960.

== Background ==
In preparation for independence on 1 January 1962, a Constitutional Assembly was called to write a constitution for the soon-to-be independent country. The Assembly was to include the 46 members of the Legislative Assembly elected in 1957 (41 Samoans and 5 Europeans), the Fautua (the two paramount chiefs of Samoa, Malietoa Tanumafili II and Tupua Tamasese Meaʻole), Tama-a-Aiga Tuiaana Tuimaleali'ifano Suatipatipa II, 123 elected chiefs (three elected from each of the 41 Samoan Legislative Assembly constituencies) and 10 elected Europeans.

In order to vote in the elections, European residents were required to take Samoan citizenship. However, only 500 of the 1,500 eligible Europeans did so, with some arguing that they should not have to renounce their nationality at a time when the Samoan state did not exist.

== Campaign ==
In the 41 Samoan constituencies, only twelve had more than three candidates and required a vote to take place. All candidates were matais. Only five Europeans were nominated for the ten seats, all of whom were returned unopposed.

== List of members ==
Constituency	Sitting MLAs	Elected members
Fautua	Tupua Tamasese Meaʻole	
Fautua	Malietoa Tanumafili II	
Tama-a-Aiga	Tuiaana Tuimaleali'ifano Suatipatipa II	
A'ana Alofi No. 1	Aiono Urima	Leaupepe Aifualaau, Tuaautoto'a Iefata, Fesola'i Pio
A'ana Alofi No. 2	Pilia'e Iuliano	Taimalie Meapelo, Umaga Pa'u, Ugapo Tauaneai
A'ana Alofi No. 3	Saipaia Galumalemana Uepa	Afamasaga Maua, Feiloaivao Pa'u Peter, Tauvalaau Lua
Aiga-i-le-Tai	Leiataua Samuelu	Levaa Fofoa, Leiataua Poai, Taupa'u Semu
Alataua West	Usu To'avalu	Tuai'aufa'i Fuifui, Aiolupotea Mana'ia, Tanuvasa Taotafa
Aleipata Itupa-i-Lalo	Amoa Tausilia	Mata'utia Fetaui, Tataivaatele Ioane, Faliuila T
Aleipata Itupa-i-Luga	Sagapolutele Pose	Seuala Meauli, Fuataga Penita, Saumalu Tui
Anoamaa East	Iuli Veni	Moeono Alai'asa Kolio, Moala Maugatai Limutau Asueru, Nonoa Aleli
Anoamaa West	Pulepule Matu'u	Leota Leauma, Luafalealo Pesa, Tagaloa Siaosi
European	Fred Betham	W.F. Betham
European	Hans Joachim Keil II	O.R. Crichton
European	Frank Nelson	Arno Max Gurau
European	Eugene Paul	H.E Hunkin
European	Peter Plowman	Percy Morgan
Fa'asaleleaga No. 1	Luamanuvae Eti Alesana	Magele Ate, Tofilau Moeloa, Seumanu Saleilua
Fa'asaleleaga No. 2	Papali'i Pesamino	Faletufuga Asiasi, Moalele Mau'afu, Tuilagi Pa'o
Fa'asaleleaga No. 3	Ufagalilo Fa'atafa	Pini F, Segi Lafa, Tofa Peleti
Fa'asaleleaga No. 4	Vui Fale	Mulitalo Faleniu, Matafeo Siatiu, Peseta Tavai
Falealili	Tuatagaloa Leutele Te'o	Fuimaono Faafete, Fonoti Faagalu, Paitomaleifi Siaki
Falealupo	Soifua Solia Gese	Fuiono Alefosio, Solia Sikuka, A'e'au Taulupo'o
Faleata East	Matai'a Europa	Taala Ioelu, Leleua Peni, Vaitagutu Siaki
Faleata West	Seiuli Tolova'a Iakopo	Ulugia Fa'alua, Ale Pusi, Matai'a Si'utaulalova'a
Falelatai & Samatau	Faalavaau Galu	Pa'u Tito
Gaga'emauga No. 1	Tevaga Paletasala	Auali'itia Faa'ole'ole, Tuala Milo, Tuala Osooso
Gaga'emauga No. 2	Tuala Tiaina	Tevaga Matafa, Semau Peleseuma, Lauago M. Tofu
Gaga'emauga No. 3	Seuamuli Etimani	Leota Iakopo, Faamoe Sasi, Matai'a Tavale
Gaga'ifomauga No. 1	Peseta Seko	Timu Kolio, Lavea Lala, Tapusoa Peni
Gaga'ifomauga No. 2	Tugaga Isa'aka	Malaitai Lautaimi, Safuneituuga Meatuai, Fui Eli Seuamuli
Gaga'ifomauga No. 3	Leasi Avaula	Polataivao Luni, One Sofai, Fiu Tanielu
Lefaga & Faleseela	Fenunuti Tauafua	Le Mamea Matatumua Ata, Fui Tauaivale, Tuala Siaki
Lepa	Fatialofa Faimalo	Auelua Filipo, Faolotoi Momoe, Auelua Tagoa'i Tufi
Lotofaga	Fiame Mata'afa	Fiso Faamotu, Seinafolava Sofara, Muagututi'a Tautau
Palauli East	Tualaulelei Mauri	Lagaaia Faamaga, Toluono Lama, Fiso Fusi
Palauli-le-Falefa	Maposua Seilala	To'ala Mulifusi, Mauisii Sefo, Mata'utia Ueni
Palauli West	Tuato Poto	Faiumu Apete, Matale Tuugafala
Safata	Anapu Solofa	Tuia Iosefa, Soalaupule Sale
Sagaga-le-Falefa	Luatua Mata'ese	Telea Fasi, Leiataatimu P, Luatuanuu Tolai
Sagaga-le-Usoga	Luafatasaga Su'e Taule'alo	Fata M, Leapaitausiliilenuu Sefo, Fafai Tuivale
Salega	To'omata Lilomaiava Tua	Tuisalega E, Fasavalu Faali'i, Tapuai Kuka
Satupa'itea	Asiata Lagolago	Faanana Fenika, Gasu Taatua, Asiata Tulelei
Siumu	Toloafa Lafaele	Li'omatefili T, Mano Togamau
Va'a-o-Fonoti	Ulualofaiga Talamaivao	Savusa Faavela, Leausa Foe, Tuimalatu Suli
Vaimauga East	Ulumalautea Papali'i	Faoasau Ausage, Leniu Fanene Avaona, Tuli'aupupu Muliaga
Vaimauga West	Tofaeono Muliaga	Toomalatai Fiso, Tuiletufuga Taualai, Asi Falana'ipupu Ulu Filiva'a
Vaisigano No. 1	Tufuga Fatu	Tapu Atonio Fidow, Fao Isaia, Masoe Pele
Vaisigano No. 2	Lesatele Rapi	Mata'u Fiaali'i, Lealuga Vaaiga
Source: Parliament of Samoa Pacific Islands Monthly
