= Tuatagaloa Leutele Teʻo =

Samoan high chief & politician (1908–1980)

Minister of Justice
- In office 1964–1967
- Succeeded by: Ulualofaiga Talamaivao Vaelaʻa

Minister of Education
- In office 1956–1964
- Succeeded by: Papaliʻi Poumau

Member of the Legislative Assembly
- In office 1957–1970
- Succeeded by: Fuimaono Mimio
- Constituency: Falealili
- In office 1951–1957
- Preceded by: Fonoti Ioane
- Constituency: Atua

Personal details
- Born: 31 May 1908
- Died: 28 July 1980 (aged 72) Poutasi, Western Samoa

Afioga Tuatagaloa Leutele Teʻo Satele Simaile (31 May 1908 – 28 July 1980) was a Western Samoan high chief and politician. He served as a member of the Legislative Assembly from 1951 until 1970 and as Minister of Education and Minister of Justice between 1956 and 1967. He was a High Chief of Poutasi, Falefa and Safata.

== Biography ==
Simaile was born in 1908 and worked as a clerk, trader and planter. He was conferred with the chiefly titles Leutele, Teʻo and Satele, before becoming Tuatagaloa in the 1940s. He became a member of the Fono of Faipule, and was elected to the Legislative Assembly from the Atua constituency in 1951. He was appointed to the Executive Council in 1953. In the 1954 elections he received the same number of votes as Fonoti Ioane. It was decided that as the incumbent, Simaile should remain the representative for the constituency, while Ioane was made a non-constituency member. The Executive Council introduced a Member System in 1956 and Simaile became Member for Education.

When the Legislative Assembly was reconstituted in 1957. he was re-elected from the Falealili constituency and was appointed Minister of Education in the new government, also initially holding the portfolio of Broadcasting. When Eugene Paul was appointed Leader of Government Business in 1958, he took on District Affairs, with Faalavaau Galu taking on Broadcasting. He was part of the 1960 Constitutional Assembly and a signatory of the independence constitution. He was re-elected in 1961 and renamed Minister of Education until the 1964 elections, after which he was appointed Minister of Justice.

Although Simaile was re-elected in 1967, he was dropped from the cabinet. He did not contest the 1970 elections.

He died in Poutasi in 1980 at the age of 72.
