= Molioʻo Setu =

Samoan politician

Member of the Legislative Assembly
- In office 1948–1951
- Succeeded by: Olaʻaiga Paʻu
- Constituency: Vaʻa-o-Fonoti

Personal details
- Died: 8 September 1959

Molioʻo Pouli Setu (died 8 September 1959) was a Western Samoan chief and politician. He served as a member of the Legislative Assembly between 1948 and 1951.

== Biography ==
A member of the Fono of Faipule, Setu was selected as the Samoan representative for Vaʻa-o-Fonoti when the Legislative Assembly was established in 1948. However, he failed to be re-elected in the 1951 elections. He also served as a district judge.

He married Tuʻiemanu Manuʻa. Their daughter Lili Tunu married Malietoa Tanumafili II in 1940. He died on 8 September 1959 at the age of 70, leaving six children.
