= Leilua Iuliano =

Samoan politician

Member of the Legislative Assembly
- In office 1957–1967
- Succeeded by: Taimalie Meapelo
- Constituency: A'ana Alofi No. 2
- In office 1967–1973
- Preceded by: Papali'i Poumau
- Succeeded by: Asi Eikeni
- Constituency: Fa'asaleleaga No. 2

Personal details
- Born: 16 January 1900
- Died: March 1974 (aged 74)

Leilua Pilia'e Iuliano (16 January 1900 – March 1974) was a Western Samoan politician. He was a member of the Legislative Assembly from 1957 until 1973.

== Biography ==
Iuliano was born in 1900 and educated at Catholic schools in Apia. He worked for several companies, and was conferred with the Pilia'e chiefly title in his 20s. He became a member of the Fono of Faipule and was involved with local government.

Iuliano was elected to the Legislative Assembly from the A'ana Alofi No. 2 constituency in the 1957 elections, going onto become an MLA renowned for his oratory skills. He was a member of the 1960 Constitutional Assembly and a signatory of the constitution. He was re-elected in A'ana Alofi No. 2 in 1961 and 1964, before successfully running in Fa'asaleleaga No. 2 in the 1967 elections. He was re-elected again in 1970, before retiring prior to the 1973 elections.

He died in March 1974 at the age of 70, survived by his wife and eleven children.
