= Fata Tamati =

Samoan politician

Member of the Legislative Assembly
- In office 1948–1951
- Succeeded by: Mataia Europa/Anapu Solofa
- Constituency: Tuamasaga

Fata Tamati was a Western Samoan chief and politician. He served as a member of the Legislative Assembly from 1948 to 1951.

== Biography ==
When the Legislative Assembly was established in 1948, Tamati was chosen to represent Tuamasaga by the three Fautua (high chiefs). He was not re-elected in 1951.
