= Gatoloai Peseta Sio =

Samoan politician

Member of the Legislative Assembly
- In office 1954–1957
- Preceded by: Vui Manu'a
- Succeeded by: Va'ai Kolone
- Constituency: Fa'asaleleaga
- In office 1950–1951
- Constituency: Fa'asaleleaga

Personal details
- Born: 15 July 1910 Puapua, German Samoa
- Died: 2 July 1990 (aged 79)

Gatoloaifaana Peseta Siaosi Sio (15 July 1910 – 2 July 1990) was a Western Samoan chief, musician, writer and politician. He served as a member of the Legislative Assembly from 1950 to 1951, and again from 1954 to 1957.

== Biography ==
The son of a London Missionary Society pastor, Peseta was educated at government schools. He worked as a schoolteacher and trader, and was conferred with the chiefly title Gatoloai. He also became a well-known Iiga songwriter alongside two brothers including Toleafoa Talitimu.

After the death of Fautua Mata'afa Faumuina Fiame Mulinu'u I in 1948, the Fono of Faipule requested that they be allowed to elect a twelfth member to the Legislative Assembly to replace him. This was authorised by the Samoa Amendment Act 1949, and Peseta was elected by the Fono to be the twelfth member on 1 April 1950. However, he was not re-elected in 1951. He then served as chairman of the Fono from 1951 to 1953, and he was awarded a Coronation Medal in 1953. He returned to the Assembly following the 1954 elections after being elected in the Fa'asaleleaga constituency. He served as an MLA until the 1957 elections. In 1958 he was appointed to the Public Service Board of Appeal for a three-year term.
