= Masoe Tulele =

Samoan politician

Member of the Legislative Assembly
- In office 1964–1967
- Preceded by: Tufuga Fatu
- Succeeded by: Va'ai Kolone
- Constituency: Vaisigano No. 1
- In office 1948–1954
- Succeeded by: Tufuga Fatu
- Constituency: Vaisigano

Afioga Masoe Tulele was a Western Samoan chief and politician. He served as a member of the Legislative Assembly from 1948 to 1954, and again from 1964 to 1967.

== Biography ==
When the Legislative Assembly was established in 1948, Tulele was chosen to represent Vaisigano by the three Fautua (high chiefs). He was re-elected in 1951, but lost his seat in the 1954 elections.

He returned to the Legislative Assembly after winning the Vaisigano No. 1 seat in the 1964 elections, defeating future Prime Minister Va'ai Kolone by six votes. He did not contest the 1967 elections, and was succeeded by Kolone.
