= Tufuga Fatu =

Samoan politician

Minister for Health
- In office 1961–1964
- Preceded by: Luamanuvae Eti
- Succeeded by: Ulualofaiga Talamaivao

Member of the Legislative Assembly
- In office 1957–1964
- Succeeded by: Masoe Tulele
- Constituency: Vaisigano No. 1
- In office 1954–1957
- Preceded by: Masoe Tulele
- Constituency: Vaisigano

Personal details
- Born: 5 February 1914
- Died: 5 December 1981 (aged 67) Apia, Western Samoa

Tauaanae Tufuga Fatuatia (5 February 1914 – 5 December 1981) was a Western Samoan chief and politician. He served as a member of the Legislative Assembly from 1954 until 1964, and as Minister for Health from 1961 to 1964.

== Biography ==
Born in 1914, Fatu attended Avele College and became a schoolteacher. He was conferred with the Tufuga title in the 1930s, and was involved in the Methodist church, chairing its lands development board, also serving as a director of the Development Bank of Western Samoa.

A member of the Fono of Faipule, he was elected to the Legislative Assembly from the Vaisigano constituency in 1954. He was re-elected in 1957 elections and was a member of the 1960 Constitutional Convention and a signatory of the independence constitution. He was re-elected again in 1961, after which he was appointed Minister for Health. However, he lost his seat in the 1964 elections. He unsuccessfully contested the constitutuency again in 1970 and 1976.

In 1981 he was elected to the executive committee of the Commonwealth Parliamentary Association. However, he died in December the same year at the age of 67.
