= Percy Morgan (disambiguation) =

Percy Morgan may refer to:

- Percy Morgan, a Welsh cricketer
- Percy Gates Morgan, a New Zealand scientist and administrator
- Percy Lewis McDonald Morgan, a Western Samoan politician
