= Mano Togamau =

Samoan politician

Minister of Lands, Survey and Broadcasting
- In office 1976–1978
- Succeeded by: Lesatele Rapi

Member of the Legislative Assembly
- In office 1970–1978
- Preceded by: Tofaeono Taulima
- In office 1964–1967
- Preceded by: Tofaeono Taulima
- Succeeded by: Tofaeono Taulima
- Constituency: Siumu

Personal details
- Born: Vaiee, Western Samoa
- Died: 1978 (aged 77)

Mano Togamau (died 1978) was a Western Samoan politician. He served as a member of the Legislative Assembly in two spells from 1964 and as Minister of Lands from 1976 until his death two years later.

== Biography ==
Togamau was born in Vaiee on the island of Upolu. He attended the Marist Brothers school in Pago Pago and Malifa High School in Apia. He then attended medical school in Fiji, subsequently working in the Western Samoa national hospital. In 1960 he was elected to the Constitutional Assembly that produced the independence constitution.

After retiring in 1964, Togamau entered politics and was elected to the Legislative Assembly in the Siumu constituency in the elections that year, defeating the incumbent Tofaeono Taulima by two votes. Although he lost his seat to Taulima in the 1967 elections, he returned to the Legislative Assembly in the 1970 elections after defeating him for a second time. He was re-elected in 1973, and after being re-elected again in 1976, he was appointed Minister of Lands, Survey and Broadcasting.

In 1978 Togamau was injured when a truck broke through the wall of his office and pinned him against the wall. He was flown to New Zealand for treatment, but died in the plane during the journey. He was survived by his wife and five children.
