= Papaliʻi Poumau =

Samoan politician

Minister for Education
- In office 1964–1967
- Preceded by: Tuatagaloa Leutele Teʻo
- Succeeded by: Tuaopepe Tame

Member of the Legislative Assembly
- In office 1964–1967
- Preceded by: Tuilagi Simi
- Succeeded by: Leilua Iuliano
- Constituency: Faʻasaleleaga No. 2

Personal details
- Died: New Zealand

Papaliʻi Asiata Fauatea Poumau MBE was a Western Samoan politician. He served as Minister for Education between 1964 and 1967.

== Biography ==
A former court interpreter and registrar in the Land and Titles Court, Poumau worked in the Western Samoa Public Service Commission, later becoming Resident Commissioner of Savaiʻi. In 1958 he became the first Samoan to represent New Zealand at the South Pacific Commission. He was made an MBE in the 1961 New Year Honours. In February 1961 he was appointed as the Samoan administrator of the referendum on independence and a new constitution.

After retiring from the civil service, he contested the Faʻasaleleaga No. 2 constituency in the 1964 general elections, defeating incumbent MLA Tuilagi Simi by 68 votes to 63. Following the elections, he was surprisingly appointed Minister for Education by Prime Minister Fiame Mataʻafa. However, he lost his seat in the 1967 elections, losing to Leilua Iuliano by 78 votes to 64. He ran again in the 1970 elections, but finished fourth out of five candidates with only eleven votes.

Poumau died in New Zealand in the early 1970s.
