= Leiataua Soloa =

Samoan politician

Member of the Legislative Assembly
- In office 1948–1951
- Succeeded by: Taupa'u Semu
- Constituency: Aiga-i-le-Tai

Leiataua Soloa was a Western Samoan chief and politician. He served as a member of the Legislative Assembly from 1948 to 1951.

== Biography ==
Soloa became the high chief of Manono Island, and was given the chiefly title of Leiataua. Following the creation of the Legislative Assembly in 1948, he was chosen to represent Aiga-i-le-Tai by the three Fautua (high chiefs). However, he was not re-elected in 1951.
