= Tuala Tulo =

Samoan politician

Member of the Legislative Assembly
- In office 1948–1953
- Constituency: Gaga'emauga

Nominated member of the Legislative Council
- In office 1936–1948

Personal details
- Died: 4 October 1953; Leauvaa, Western Samoa

Tuala Tulo (died 4 October 1953) was a Western Samoan politician who served as a member of the Fono of Faipule, Legislative Council and Legislative Assembly between 1936 and 1953.

== Biography ==
Tulo was a member of the anti-colonial Mau movement. He was arrested and subsequently prosecuted for sedition in 1934, leading to a fine.

When the Fono of Faipule was reconstituted in 1936, Tulo became a member of the legislature. He was subsequently nominated by the Fono to become a member of the Legislative Council, taking his seat on 16 December. He was re-nominated following the 1938 elections.

In 1948 he was selected as one of the eleven Samoans to join the new Legislative Assembly. He retained his seat when the Samoan members were chosen as part of the 1951 election process.

Tulo died at his home in Leauvaa in October 1953.
