= Willie Stowers =

Samoan politician

- Stowers in 1912

Member of the Legislative Assembly
- In office 1948–1951

Personal details
- Born: 25 September 1887; Lano, Samoa
- Died: 15 May 1971 (aged 83); Tokoroa, New Zealand

William Frederick Stowers (25 September 1887 – 15 May 1971) was a Western Samoan politician. He served as a member of the Legislative Assembly from 1948 to 1951.

== Biography ==
Stowers was born in Lano on Savaii in September 1887, the son of Eugene James Simi Stowers and Mary Tereisea Fa'aletea Pa'u. He was educated at the Marist Brothers School in Apia, and later moved to Auckland in New Zealand, where he worked for John Burns & Co.

He signed up for the New Zealand Expeditionary Force in March 1916, and after three months training with the Mounted Rifles, departed for Europe in June. He served in France alongside two of his brothers and was involved in the Battle of the Somme and the Battle of Messines, during which he was shot in the neck. He subsequently recovered in a hospital in England. After a short trip to see family in Samoa in 1918, he returned to New Zealand. However, he later came back to Samoa and became involved in horse racing during the 1920s.

Following the introduction of the Legislative Assembly in 1948, he contested the European seats in the first elections as a member of the United Citizens Party, and was elected in fifth place. His wife Bella died in April 1951, and he did not contest the elections shortly afterwards. He died in Tokoroa in New Zealand in 1971.
