= Asiata Muese =

Samoan politician

Member of the Legislative Assembly
- In office 1948–1951
- Succeeded by: To'omata Lilomaiava Tua
- Constituency: Satupa'itea

Member of the Legislative Council
- In office 1939–1940

Asiata Muese was a Western Samoan chief and politician. He served as a member of the Legislative Council from 1938 to 1939, and then as a member of the Legislative Assembly from 1948 to 1951.

== Biography ==
A member of the executive committee of the Mau movement, Muese was appointed to the Legislative Council in January 1939 following the November 1938 elections. However, when the Samoan membership was reorganised in August 1940, he was not reappointed.

When the Legislative Council was replaced by the Legislative Assembly in 1948, he was chosen to represent Satupa'itea by the three Fautua (high chiefs). He was not re-elected in 1951.
