= Lavea Lala =

Samoan politician

Member of the Legislative Assembly
- In office 1948–1951
- Succeeded by: Timu Kolio
- Constituency: Gaga'ifomauga

Lavea Lala was a Western Samoan chief and politician. He served as a member of the Legislative Assembly from 1948 to 1951.

== Biography ==
Following the creation of the Legislative Assembly in 1948, he was chosen to represent Gaga'ifomauga by the three Fautua (high chiefs). However, he was not re-elected in 1951. In 1960 he was elected to the Constitutional Assembly that drew up the independence constitution, and was a signatory of the document.
