= Ministry of Justice and Courts Administration (Samoa) =

The Ministry of Justice and Courts Administration of Samoa has several roles and responsibilities such as the following:

- Providing sound policy advice to the government
- Gathering input from the public to develop justice-related legislation and improve the justice system
- Improving and providing judicial support through the administration, case management, technology, human resource support, and funding for judicial training and development
- Leading the Law and Justice Sector by providing advice and overseeing the managing and budgetary processes
- Managing and processing of cases for Lands and Titles Court and Registration of Matai titles
- Resolving and collecting court-imposed monetary penalties and infringement fines
- Support corporate functions such as human resource management, information and communications technology, and other processes.

== List of ministers ==
Term	Minister
1959–1963	Anapu Solofa
1963–1964	Fiamē Mataʻafa Faumuina Mulinuʻu II
1964–1967	Tuatagaloa Leutele Teʻo
1967–1970	Ulualofaiga Talamaivao
1970–1971	Tuala Paulo
1971–1973	Amoa Tausilia
1973–1975	Tupua Tamasese Lealofi IV
1975–1979	Lilomaiava Niko
1979–1982	Asi Eikeni
1982	Taliaoa Maoama
1982	Papaliʻi Laupepa
1982–1985	Taliaoa Maoama
1985	Tafua Kalolo
1985–1988	George Lober
1988	Tofilau Eti Alesana
1988–1991	Leiataua Vaiao Alailima
1991–1996	Fulmaono Lotomau
1996–1998	Vaʻai Papu Vailupe
1998–2001	Molioo Teofilo Vaeluaga
2001–2004	Seumanu Aita Ah Wa
2004–2006	Gaʻina Tino
2007–2011	Unasa Mesi Galo
2011–2016	Fiamē Naomi Mataʻafa
2016–2021	Faaolesa Katopau Ainuu
2021–	Matamua Vasati Pulufana

== See also ==
- Justice ministry
- Politics of Samoa
