= Jacob Helg =

Samoan politician

Member of the Legislative Assembly
- In office 1948–1954

Personal details
- Born: 30 July 1894 Utumapu, Samoa

Jacob Helg (born 30 July 1894) was a Western Samoan politician. He served as a member of the Legislative Assembly from 1948 to 1954.

== Biography ==
Helg was born in Utumapu in 1894, the son of Swiss immigrant Johannes Helg and a Samoan mother. He was educated at the Marist Brothers School in Apia, and later become president of the Samoan branch of the Marist Old Boys Union. He married Augustina in 1920, with whom he had six children. He worked for O.F. Nelson & Co from 1918 to 1934 and then I.H. Carruthers until 1940. After working as the stores manager for the New Zealand Reparations Estates from 1940 to 1948, he became manager of the Mulifauna Trading Company.

Following the creation of the Legislative Assembly in 1948, he contested the European seats in the first elections as a member of the United Citizens Party, and was elected in second place. He was re-elected in 1951 (in fifth place), and in 1953 was part of the Western Samoan delegation to New Zealand for the visit of the new Queen Elizabeth II. He lost his seat in the 1954 elections, when he was placed sixth.
