= Tofa Siaosi =

Samoan politician

Minister of Finance
- In office 1970–1973
- Preceded by: Fred Betham
- Succeeded by: Sam Saili

Member of the Legislative Assembly
- In office 1970–1973
- Preceded by: Leaupepe Fiti
- Constituency: A'ana Alofi No. 1
- In office 1967–1970
- Preceded by: Vaitagutu Siaki
- Succeeded by: Mataia Europa
- Constituency: Faleata East

Personal details
- Died: June 1981; Apia, Western Samoa

Tuatagaloa Tofa Siaosi (died June 1981) was a Western Samoan politician. He served as a member of the Legislative Assembly from 1967 until 1973 and was Minister of Finance between 1970 and 1973.

== Biography ==
Born George Nauer, the son of politician Thomas Nauer, he was educated in New Zealand. After returning to Samoa, he took Samoan status and adopted the Samoan version of his name. He married the niece of Tupua Tamasese Lealofi IV and gained the titles Taneolevo, Tofa and Tuatagaloa.

In 1967 Siaosi was elected unopposed to the Legislative Assembly from the Faleata East constituency, becoming the youngest person ever elected to the Legislative Assembly. In 1969 he introduced a bill for universal suffrage, replacing the restriction on only matai being allowed to vote, but it was defeated by a vote of 37–6.

Siaosi switched to the A'ana Alofi No. 1 constituency for the 1970 elections and was re-elected. Following the elections, he was appointed Minister of Finance by Prime Minister Tupua Tamasese, becoming the country's youngest minister at only 27. However, he lost his seat in the 1973 elections, in which he ran in the Falealili constituency. He subsequently worked as an accountant for Peter Meredith firm. He unsuccessfully contested the Aana Alofi No. 1 constituency again in 1976.

He died in Apia in June 1981 following a heart attack.
