= Percy Lewis McDonald Morgan =

Samoan politician

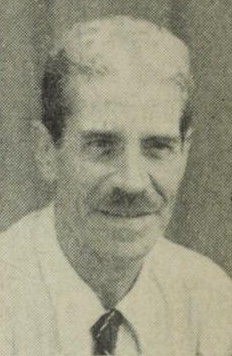

Member of the Legislative Assembly
- In office 1954–1957

Personal details
- Born: New Zealand
- Party: Independent
- Profession: Civil servant, plantation owner

Percy Lewis McDonald Morgan was a New Zealand-born Western Samoan politician.

== Biography ==
Born in New Zealand, Morgan emigrated to Western Samoa. He originally worked in the civil service, serving as Chief Clerk in the Treasury Department and Public Works Department, and Secretary of the Board of Trade. He later left to take over a cocoa plantation.

Morgan contested the 1948 general elections as an independent, but failed to be elected. He ran again in 1954 and was elected. He lost his seat in the 1957 elections.

Despite having been a strong opponent of moves towards self-government, he was part of the Constitutional Convention that produced the 1960 independence constitution. However, he refused to sign the document, the only member of the convention to do so. The following year he contested the general elections, but was unsuccessful.
