= VUI =

VUI or Vui or variation, may refer to:

Computing

- Voice user interface, a voice/speech platform that enables human interaction with computers
- Video usability information, extra information that can be inserted into a video stream to enhance its use

Medicine and biology

- VUI – 202012/01, a "variant under investigation" of SARS-CoV-2, the virus which causes COVID-19
- Vattikuti Urology Institute, Henry Ford Hospital, Detroit, Michigan, USA

People

- Vui Florence Saulo, American Samoan businesswoman and politician
- Vui Manu'a, Western Samoan chief and politician
- Chris Vui (born 1983) New Zealand rugby footballer
- Shambeckler Vui (born 1997) Australian rugby player
