= Thomas Nauer =

Samoan politician (1910–1953)

Member of the Legislative Assembly
- In office 1948–1953
- Constituency: A'ana

Personal details
- Born: 1910
- Died: 9 February 1953

Thomas George Nauer (1910 – 9 February 1953), also known as Tofa Tōmasi, was a Western Samoan politician who served as a member of the Legislative Assembly between 1948 and 1953.

== Biography ==
Nauer was the son of a German trader and his Samoan wife, a daughter of a Fa'amatai. He was educated at the Marist school, and later became a trader based in Falealili, where he married Pulaloa, who was also half German and the daughter of a Samoan chief.

During World War II Nauer was deported to New Zealand as a result of his German citizenship and interned. Whilst in New Zealand he studied commercial law and accountancy. When he returned to Samoa after the war, he renounced his European status, becoming one of the first European-Samoans to take Samoan status. He took the title Tofa Tōmasi, and lived as a matai at Faleasiu, where he ran a small shop. After being nominated to be a member of the Legislative Assembly for A'ana as part of the 1948 election process, he was initially unable to take his seat due to his German nationality. However, after gaining British citizenship, he was able to become a member of the legislature. He was subsequently re-elected in the 1951 elections, and remained an MLA until his death on 9 February 1953 at the age of 43, having been widely viewed as a strong candidate to become Samoa's first Prime Minister.

Nauer's son George initially held European status, but also changed to Samoan, inheriting his father's title. He later became a government minister in 1970.
