= Peter Plowman =

Samoan politician

Member for Transport and Communications
- In office 1956–1957
- Succeeded by: Frank Nelson

Member of the Legislative Assembly
- In office 1954–1964
- Constituency: European

Personal details
- Born: 10 December 1902 Hobart, Australia
- Died: July 1983 (aged 80) Apia, Western Samoa

Peter Plowman (10 December 1902 – July 1983) was an Australia-born businessman and politician in Western Samoa. He served as a member of the Legislative Assembly between 1954 and 1964, and as Member for Transport and Communications from 1956 to 1957.

== Biography ==
Born in Hobart in December 1902, Plowman was educated at Scott's College and Hutchin's College. He began working at a cattle station in the Northern Territory in 1920, before becoming a plantation manager in the Solomon Islands in 1923. The following year he relocated to the New Hebrides where he did the same job until moving to Sydney in 1931 to join Airzone Ltd as a manager and director. During World War II he served in the Royal Australian Navy and the Royal Navy, becoming an explosives specialist.

After his marriage to Elsie Paxton ended, he moved to Apia in Western Samoa in 1947 to work for A.G. Smyth & Co, later setting up his own import-export business. He also became one of the largest poultry farmers in the islands. After settling in Samoa, he married Aggie Mann, with whom he had two children.

In 1954 he was elected to the Legislative Assembly from the European constituency, also becoming a member of the Executive Council. In 1956 he was appointed Member for Transport and Communications. He was re-elected in 1957 and was a member of the 1960 Constitutional Assembly that produced the independence constitution, becoming one of its signatories. He was re-elected again in 1961, but did not contest the 1964 elections when the number of European seats was reduced from five to two. He ran unsuccessfully in 1967, finishing last out of the four candidates.

In 1966 he was appointed chairman of the Apia Harbour Board. He died in Apia in July 1983 at the age of 80.
