= Anapu Solofa =

Samoan politician

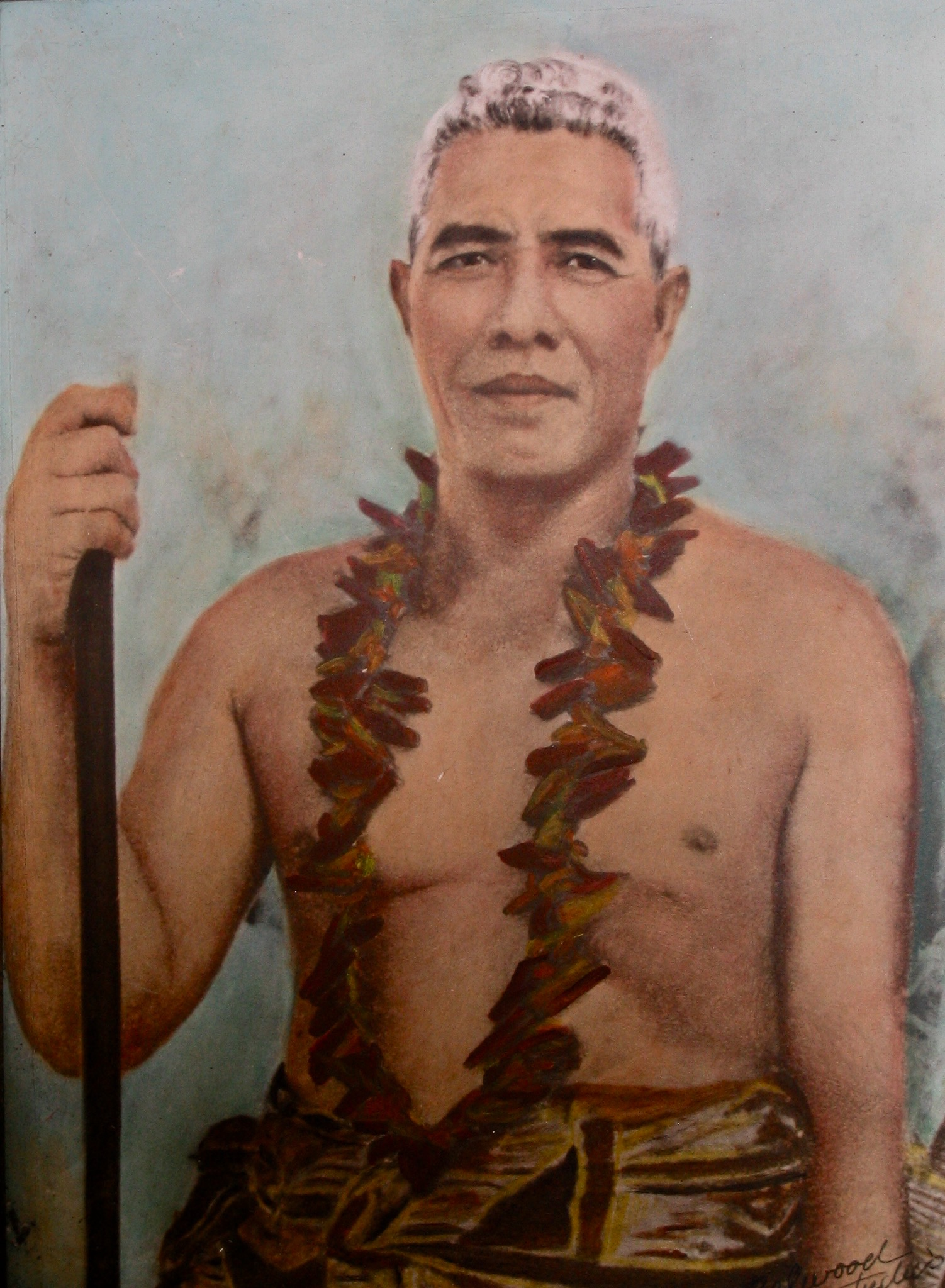

Minister of Justice
- In office 1959–1963
- Succeeded by: Fiame Mata'afa

Member of the Legislative Assembly
- In office 1951–1954
- Constituency: Tuamasaga South
- In office 1957–1963
- Constituency: Safata

Personal details
- Born: 12 January 1903
- Died: May 1963 (aged 60)

Anapu Solofa (12 January 1903 – May 1963) was a Western Samoan chief and politician. He served as a member of the Legislative Assembly and as Minister of Justice.

== Biography ==
Born on 12 January 1903, in Sa’anapu, Upolu, the son of Anapu Tui’i (Sa’anapu) and Fa’ao Anae (Falelatai), Solofa was given the chiefly title Anapu in 1916 at the age of 13. In 1924 he became the first head boy of the new Avele College. He was a member of the anti-colonial Mau movement and the Speaker of the Fono of Faipule. In 1937 he became an assessor in the High Court.

Solofa was elected to the Legislative Assembly in the 1951 elections, winning the Tuamasaga South constituency. He lost his seat in the 1954 elections, but later participated in the 1954 constitutional convention. He returned to the Legislative Assembly following the 1957 elections as the representative of Safata and became a member of the Executive Council. When cabinet government was introduced in 1959, he was appointed Minister of Justice.

As a member of the Legislative Assembly, Solofa participated in the 1960 constitutional convention and was one of the signatories of the constitution. Following the 1961 elections, he remained Minister of Justice in the government led by Fiame Mata'afa Faumuina Mulinu'u II.

He died of a heart attack at a church conference in May 1963.
