= Asiata Lagolago =

Samoan politician

Minister for Agriculture
- In office 1961–1964
- Preceded by: Tualaulelei Mauri
- Succeeded by: Laufili Time

Member of the Legislative Assembly
- In office 1957–1973
- Succeeded by: Asiata Iakopo
- Constituency: Satupa'itea

Personal details
- Born: 5 June 1914
- Died: 1973 (aged 58)

Afioga Asiata Lagolago (5 June 1914 – 1973) was a Western Samoan politician. He served as Minister for Agriculture between 1961 and 1964, and as a member of the Legislative Assembly from 1957 until his death in early 1973.

== Biography ==
Lagolago worked as a teacher between 1934 and 1942. He became a businessman, running a bus company and later cocoa and coconut plantations on Vaega.

After being conferred with the Asiata title in 1956, he was elected to the Legislative Assembly in 1957. He participated in the 1960 Constitutional Assembly and was one of the signatories of the constitution. After being re-elected in 1961 he was appointed Minister for Agriculture by Prime Minister Fiame Mata'afa. Although he retained his seat in the 1964 elections, he was replaced as Minister of Agriculture by Laufili Time. He subsequently chaired the Bills Committee and Public Accounts Committee, and was re-elected in 1967 and 1970.

Lagolago died shortly before the 1973 elections.
