= Faipule =

Faipule may refer to:

- Faipule, village leaders of an atoll in the politics of Tokelau
- Fono of Faipule, former legislative body in Samoa
- Electoral districts of Samoa
