= Afoafouvale Misimoa =

Samoan politician

Secretary-General of the South Pacific Commission
- In office 1970–1971
- Preceded by: John E. de Young
- Succeeded by: Fred Betham

Member for Works
- In office 1956–1957
- Succeeded by: Frank Nelson

Member of the Legislative Assembly
- In office 1961–1967
- Preceded by: Tualaulelei Mauri
- Succeeded by: Mataafā Samaeli
- Constituency: Palauli East
- In office 1951–1957
- Constituency: European

Personal details
- Born: 25 September 1900; Western Samoa
- Died: 18 February 1971 (aged 70); Tarawa, Gilbert and Ellice Islands

Afioga Afoafouvale Misimoa (25 September 1900 – 18 February 1971), also known by his European name Harry William Moors, was a Western Samoan businessman and politician. He served as a member of the Legislative Assembly in two spells between 1951 and 1967, and was the first Pacific Islander to become Secretary-General of the South Pacific Commission. He also founded the Samoa Rugby Union.

== Biography ==
Misimoa was born in September 1900, the son of Harry Jay Moors, an American trader and friend of Robert Louis Stevenson. He attended Auckland Grammar School in New Zealand and Belmont Military Academy in the United States before studying at Stanford University. During World War I he served in the American military in France and Germany.

After returning to Western Samoa, Misimoa joined the civil service, working for the Department of Samoan Affairs. A keen sportsman, he founded the Samoa Rugby Football Union in 1924 and built the first golf course in Western Samoa. In 1928 he joined O.F. Nelson and Co, working for his brother-in-law Olaf Frederick Nelson, before leaving in 1934 to establish a dairy firm. He was also a founder member of the Apia Chamber of Commerce. He joined the Samoa Defence Force in 1938, serving as Commander of the group of Samoan troops that joined the Māori Battalion. He was subsequently seconded to the United States Marine Corps, training American army personnel in bush tactics and jungle warfare.

Misimoa entered politics in the early 1950s. He was elected to the Legislative Assembly as a European representative in 1951, and was re-elected in 1954 as the most voted-for candidate. He was appointed to the Executive Council, and when a Member System was introduced in 1956, he became Member for Works. However, he lost his seat in the 1957 elections. Prior to the 1961 elections he renounced his European status and contested the Samoan constituency of Palauli East, defeating former Minister Tualaulelei Mauri by 46 votes to 42. However, Mauri submitted a petition seeking to overturn his defeat, claiming that a death oath had been placed on voters by a local chief if Misimoa was not elected. Mauri's case was later dismissed due to contradictory evidence. He was re-elected in 1964, but surprisingly lost his seat in the 1967 elections.

Having served as Senior Commissioner for Western Samoa on the South Pacific Commission, in January 1970 Misimoa became the organisation's Secretary-General, the first Pacific Islander to hold the post. He died during an official visit to Tarawa in the Gilbert and Ellice Islands in February 1971.
