= Lesatele Rapi =

Samoan politician

Minister of Lands and Survey
- In office 1979
- Preceded by: Mano Togamau

Minister of Lands
- In office 1973–1976
- Preceded by: Polataivao Fosi
- Succeeded by: Mano Togamau

Minister for Works and Transport
- In office 1967–1970
- Preceded by: Frank Nelson
- Succeeded by: Tupuola Efi

Member of the Legislative Assembly
- In office 1957–1979
- Succeeded by: Matautia Fanolua
- Constituency: Vaisigano No. 2

Personal details
- Died: December 1979 (aged 70)

Afioga Lesatele Rapi (died December 1979) was a Western Samoan chief and politician. He was a member of the Legislative Assembly and served in the cabinet three times between 1967 and his death.

== Biography ==
Rapi was elected to the Legislative Assembly in the 1957 elections. He was a member of the 1960 Constitutional Assembly and a signatory of the independence constitution. He was re-elected in 1961 and ran unopposed in the 1964 elections. After being re-elected unopposed again in the 1967 elections he was appointed Minister for Works and Transport by Prime Minister Fiame Mata'afa. Despite being re-elected unopposed in the 1970 elections, he was left out of the cabinet of new Prime Minister Tupua Tamasese.

Mata'afa returned as Prime Minister following the 1973 elections and Rapi was appointed Minister of Lands. Returned unopposed again in 1976, he was not included in the new government of Tupuola Efi. However, he returned as Minister of Lands and Survey following the February 1979 elections; prior to his appointment to the cabinet he had voted for Efi and against his brother Va'ai Kolone in the vote for Prime Minister, which Efi won by a single vote.

He died in the national hospital in December 1979 after collapsing outside the Legislative Assembly, survived by his wife Tiresa and twelve children.
