= 1948 Western Samoan general election =

General elections were held in Western Samoa on 28 April 1948, the first to the new Legislative Assembly. The United Citizens Party won four of the five directly elected seats.

== Electoral system ==
The new 26-member Legislative Assembly consisted of the Administrator, six civil servants, eleven Samoans appointed by the Fono of Faipule, three Fautua (Samoan chiefs) and five members directly elected by people with European status, which included people of mixed European and Samoan descent.

== Campaign ==
The European seats were contested between the United Citizens Party, which was formed at a meeting on 16 March and supported by prominent businessmen in Apia, and the Labour Party led by Amando Stowers. Both parties nominated a full slate of five candidates, with the United Citizens Party holding a primary election to select its candidates after nine members put themselves forwards.

The campaign included radio broadcasts, public meetings and leafleting.

== Results ==
=== European members ===
Party	Votes	%	Seats
United Citizens Party	2,259	63.01	4
Labour Party	1,208	33.70	1
Independents	118	3.29	0
Total	3,585	100.00	5
Source: Pacific Islands Monthly

==== By candidate ====
Candidate	Party	Votes	%	Notes
Eugene Paul	United Citizens Party	568	15.84	Elected
Jacob Helg	United Citizens Party	510	14.23	Elected
Fred Betham	United Citizens Party	468	13.05	Elected
Amando Stowers	Labour Party	436	12.16	Re-elected
Willie Stowers	United Citizens Party	383	10.68	Elected
Arno Max Gurau	Labour Party	342	9.54	
Sammy Meredith	United Citizens Party	330	9.21	
Emil Fabricius	Labour Party	226	6.30	
G.J. Pritchard	Labour Party	129	3.60	
Percy Morgan	Independent	118	3.29	
D. Crichton	Labour Party	75	2.09	
Total		3,585	100.00	
Source: Pacific Islands Monthly

=== Samoan members ===
A series of meetings was held in January 1948 to select the 11 Samoan representatives. However, the meetings were inconclusive, and instead a list of 31 names was given to the three fautua, Mataʻafa, Malietoa and Tamasese to choose from. The choices were announced in mid-April.

Districts	Member
Aʻana	Thomas Nauer
Aiga-i-le-Tai	Leiataua Soloa
Atua	Fonoti Ioane
Faʻasaleleaga	Vui Manuʻa
Gagaʻemauga	Tuala Tulo
Gagaʻifomauga	Lavea Lala
Palauli	Tualaulelei Mauri
Satupaʻitea	Asiata Muese
Tuamasaga	Fata Tamati
Vaʻa-o-Fonoti	Molioʻo Setu
Vaisigano	Masoe Tulele
Source: Meti

== Aftermath ==
The new Legislative Assembly was opened on 2 June 1948 with a ceremony at Mulinuʻu involving the new national flag being formally raised for the first time.

After the death of Fautua Mataʻafa Faumuina Fiame Mulinuʻu I in 1948, the Fono requested that they be allowed to elect a twelfth member to replace him. This was authorised by the Samoa Amendment Act 1949, and Gatoloai Peseta Sio was elected by the Fono to be the twelfth member on 1 April 1950.
