= Vui Manuʻa =

Samoan politician

Member of the Legislative Assembly
- In office 1948–1954
- Succeeded by: Gatoloai Peseta Sio
- Constituency: Faʻasaleleaga

Vui Manuʻa was a Western Samoan chief and politician. He served as a member of the Legislative Assembly from 1948 to 1954.

== Biography ==
Following the creation of the Legislative Assembly in 1948, he was chosen to represent Faʻasaleleaga by the three Fautua (high chiefs). He was re-elected in 1951, serving until the 1954 elections.
