= Tuala Paulo =

Western Samoan journalist and politician

Minister of Education
- In office 1971–1973
- Preceded by: Fuimaono Moasope
- Succeeded by: Alfonso Philipp

Minister of Justice
- In office 1970–1971
- Preceded by: Ulualofaiga Talamaivao
- Succeeded by: Amoa Tausilia

Member of the Legislative Assembly
- In office 1964–1973
- Preceded by: Tevaga Paletasala
- Succeeded by: Muagututi'a Pinati
- Constituency: Gaga'emauga No. 1

Personal details
- Died: 1979 (aged 49)

Tuala Paulo (died 1979) was a Western Samoan journalist and politician. He served as a member of the Legislative Assembly between 1964 and 1973 and as Minister of Education and Minister of Justice during the early 1970s.

== Biography ==
Paulo worked as a journalist, rising to become editor of the Samoa Bulletin. He contested the Gaga'emauga No. 1 constituency in the 1964 elections and was elected to the Legislative Assembly. He was re-elected in 1967, after which he was a candidate for the speakership. Although he lost 24–22 to Magele Ate in the second round of voting, he was then the only candidate for the deputy speakership and took up the post.

After being re-elected in 1970, Paulo was appointed Minister of Justice. In a cabinet reshuffle the following year he became Minister of Education. However, he was defeated by Muagututi'a Pinati in the 1973 elections. He returned to journalism, becoming editor of the South Seas Star and later Tautai.

He died in 1979 at the age of 49.
