= Eugene Paul =

Samoan politician

Eugene Paul OBE

Leader of Government Business
- In office 1958–1959
- Succeeded by: Fiame Mataʻafa (as Prime Minister)

Minister of Finance
- In office 1959–1961
- Prime Minister: Fiame Mataʻafa
- Preceded by: L. M. Cook (Financial Secretary)
- Succeeded by: Fred Betham

Minister of Economic Development
- In office 1957–1959

Member of the Legislative Assembly
- In office 1948–1954, 1957–1961
- Constituency: European

Personal details
- Born: 3 November 1901
- Died: 28 December 1971 (aged 70) Honolulu, United States

Eugene Friedrich Paul OBE (3 November 1901 – 28 December 1971) was a Western Samoan businessman and politician. He served as a member of the Legislative Assembly in two spells between 1948 and 1961, was the first Leader of Government Business in 1958, and held the posts of Minister of Economic Development and Minister of Finance between 1957 and 1961.

== Biography ==
Paul attended German Government School and the Marist Brothers school in Apia. After leaving school he joined the American military to fight in World War I. When he returned to Samoa after the war, he worked for P.C. Fabricus and O.F. Nelson. He married Flora in 1924, and started his own business, Gold Star Transport, in 1926. In 1935 he founded Samoa Theatres Ltd, and in 1945 established the Samoa Printing and Publishing Company.

Paul was elected to the Legislative Assembly as a United Citizens Party candidate in the 1948 elections, topping the poll in the European constituency. He topped the poll again in 1951, but did not contest the 1954 elections. Returning to politics three years later, he topped the poll again in the 1957 elections. Following the elections, he was appointed Minister of Economic Development in the Executive Council. In February 1958 he was elected the first Leader of Government Business.

In 1959 a full cabinet system was introduced. Paul ran for election to the post of Prime Minister, but was defeated by Fiame Mata'afa as Samoan MLAs preferred to have a full Samoan in post. He was subsequently appointed Minister of Finance by Mata'afa, but did not contest the 1961 elections and retired from politics.

Having founded Polynesian Airlines in 1959, he became its chair in 1960 and also served as president of the Chamber of Commerce. He was made an OBE in the 1962 New Year Honours. He died in the Queen's Hospital in Honolulu in December 1971 following a spinal operation, and was survived by his wife and three children.
