= Minister of Finance (Samoa) =

This is a list of finance ministers of Samoa.

- Leicester Mitchell Cook, 1952–1959 (Financial Secretary)
- Eugene Paul, 1959–1961
- Fred Betham, 1961–1970
- Tofa Siaosi, 1970–1973
- Sam Saili, 1973–1975
- Aumua Ioane, 1975–1976
- Vaovasamanaia Filipo, 1976–1982
- Tofilau Eti, 1982–1984
- Tuilaepa Aiono Sailele Malielegaoi, 1984–1985
- Sam Saili, 1985–1987
- Faasootauloa Pualanga, 1987–1988
- Tuilaepa Aiono Sailele Malielegaoi, 1988–2001
- Misa Telefoni, 2001—2006
- Niko Lee Hang, 2006—2011
- Faumuina Tiatia Liuga, 2011–2014
- Tuilaepa Aiono Sailele Malielegaoi, 2014–2016
- Sili Epa Tuioti, 2016–2021
- Mulipola Anarosa Ale Molioo, 2021–
