= Tugaga Maulalo =

Western Samoan politician and judge

Member of the Legislative Assembly
- In office 1976–1979
- Preceded by: Le'aumoana Fereti
- Succeeded by: Malaitai Magasiva
- Constituency: Gaga'ifomauga No. 2

Personal details
- Died: 1986

Tugaga Maulalo (died 1986) was a Western Samoan politician and judge. He served as a member of the Legislative Assembly from 1976 to 1979.

== Biography ==
A civil servant, Maulalo served as a clerk and administrative officer. He contested the Gaga'ifomauga No. 2 constituency in the 1976 elections, defeating Malaitai Magasiva by five votes. He lost his seat in the 1979 elections, finishing fourth out of five candidates. He was subsequently appointed as a judge on the Land and Titles Court.

He died at his home in 1986.
