= Tualaulelei Mauri =

Samoan politician

Minister of Agriculture
- In office 1959–1961
- Preceded by: Fiame Mata'afa
- Succeeded by: Asiata Lagolago

Minister of Lands
- In office 1956–1959
- Preceded by: Post created
- Succeeded by: To'omata Lilomaiava Tua

Member of the Legislative Assembly
- In office 1948–1957
- Constituency: Palauli
- In office 1957–1961
- Constituency: Palauli East

Member of the Legislative Council
- In office 1943–1948

Personal details
- Born: 12 June 1903
- Died: 8 September 1961 (aged 58); Apia, Western Samoa

Tualaulelei Mauri (12 June 1903 – 8 September 1961) was a Western Samoan chief and politician. He served as a member of the Legislative Council and Legislative Assembly between 1943 and 1961, and as Minister of Lands and Minister of Agriculture between 1956 and 1961.

== Biography ==
Mauri was born on 12 June 1903. Originally from the villages of Siumu and Vaito'omuli, he attended the Marist Brothers schools in Apia and Suva in Fiji. He subsequently worked in the civil service for eleven years in the departments of Post and Telegraphs, Public Works and the Secretariat. He also spent 15 year working in the private sector. In 1938 he was made a chief.

In 1943 Mauri was appointed to the Legislative Council by Administrator Alfred Turnbull, and was reappointed following the 1944 elections. In the 1948 elections to the new Legislative Assembly, he was elected in the Palauli constituency. He was re-elected in 1951, and in In 1953, was awarded the Queen Elizabeth II Coronation Medal. He was re-elected again in 1954. Having previously served on the Executive Council, when a Member System was introduced in 1956, he became Member for Lands.

The Legislative Assembly was expended prior to the 1957 elections and Mauri was re-elected in Palauli East. Following the elections, full ministerial government was introduced and Mauri was appointed Minister of Lands. In February 1959 he was convicted in the High Court of assault and had to give up his seat and ministerial position. However, in the subsequent by-election he was returned unopposed. When the office of Prime Minister was created later in the year, he was one of three candidates for the post, but was defeated by Fiame Mata'afa. He was appointed Minister for Agriculture, Avele College and Marketing Division in Mata'afa's new government.

In the 1961 elections he lost to Afoafouvale Misimoa in the Palauli East constituency by 46 votes to 42. He submitted a petition to the high court to have the result overturned, claiming that a death oath had been placed on voters by a local chief if Misimoa was not elected. However, his case was dismissed due to contradictory evidence.

Mauri died at his home in Apia on 8 September 1961.
