= Amoa Tausilia =

Samoan politician

Speaker of the Legislative Assembly
- In office 1961–1967
- Preceded by: Luafatasaga Kalapu
- Succeeded by: Magele Ate

Minister of Justice
- In office 1971–1973
- Preceded by: Tuala Paulo
- Succeeded by: Tupua Tamasese Lealofi

Minister of Education
- In office 1970–1971
- Preceded by: Tuaopepe Tame
- Succeeded by: Tuala Paulo

Member of the Legislative Assembly
- In office 1957–1973
- Succeeded by: Tafua Kalolo
- Constituency: Aleipata Itupa-i-Lalo

Personal details
- Born: 24 August 1922 (age 104) Samusu, Western Samoa

Amoa Lolesio Tausilia (born 24 August 1922) was a Western Samoan chief and politician. He served as Speaker of the Legislative Assembly from 1961 to 1967 and as Minister of Education and Minister of Justice from between 1970 and 1973.

== Biography ==
Tausilia was born Samusu on Upolu in August 1922. He was educated at the Marist Brothers School in Apia and subsequently worked as a teacher, serving as headteacher of Chanel Primary School between 1943 and 1947. From 1948 to 1951 he worked as a merchandise manager for Samoa Traders. He was conferred with the chiefly title Amoa in 1950, and later joined the civil service, working for the Registrar of Co-operative Societies.

Tausilia contested the Aleipata Itupa-i-Lalo constituency in the 1957 general elections and was elected to the Legislative Assembly. The following year he was elected Deputy Speaker. As a member of the Legislative Assembly he criticised new Zealand's colonial educational policy for the lack of trained samoan administrators and professionals. He was later part of the 1960 Constitutional Assembly that drew up the independence constitution, to which he was a signatory. After being re-elected in 1961, he was elected Speaker. He was re-elected Speaker following the 1964 elections, serving until the 1967 elections.

After being re-elected again in 1970, Tausilia was appointed Minister of Education. In a cabinet reshuffle the following year, he became Minister of Justice. He lost his seat in the 1973 elections. He contested the seat unsuccessfully again in 1976, 1979 and 1982.
