= Arno Max Gurau =

Samoan politician

Member of the Legislative Assembly
- In office 1951–1957, 1961

Personal details
- Born: Berlin, Germany
- Died: 1 June 1961 Apia, Western Samoa

Arno Max Gurau (died 1 June 1961) was a Western Samoan politician and the only Jewish inhabitant of the country. He served as a member of the Legislative Assembly between 1951 and 1957, and again in 1961.

== Biography ==
Gurau was born and grew up in Berlin. He began working in the timber industry, including a stint in Russia. He later joined the Germany Army, and following two years of training, moved to German South West Africa in 1911 to work as a railway construction clerk. In 1913 he spent time in New Zealand and Tonga, before moving to German Samoa shortly before the outbreak of World War I.

After settling in Samoa he worked as a clerk for O.F. Nelson & Co, before becoming a cocoa planter in Lesea. He later worked for the government, monitoring banana shipments, before becoming an accountant and office manager at P.C. Fabricus. When the firm was sold, he set up as a trader. He was married to Ailafo Mulifanua (c. 1899) in 1919 and had one son, Max Tafa. Arno later married Mathilda Roebeck in 1923 and had another son Hans Rudolf Gurau. Thirdly married Elizabeth Sophie (Alisa) Huch in 1926.Brunt, T. To Walk Under Palm Trees - The Germans in Samoa, Snapshots from Albums -1. In total had six children and 23 grandchildren. In 1951 he was described by the Jewish Telegraphic Agency as the only Jew in Western Samoa.

In 1948 Gurau ran in the elections for the new Legislative Assembly as a representative of the Labour Party, finishing as the highest-placed candidate not to be elected. However, he was successful in the 1951 elections, and was re-elected in 1954. He lost his seat in the 1957 elections.

In 1960 Gurau was elected to the Constitutional Assembly that was to draw up the independence constitution for Western Samoa. In the Legislative Assembly elections in February the following year, he was returned to the legislature. However, he died at his home in Apia on 1 June 1961 at the age of 75.
