= Luafatasaga Kalapu =

Samoan politician

Speaker of the Legislative Assembly
- In office 1957–1961
- Preceded by: Guy Powles (president)
- Succeeded by: Amoa Tausilia

Luafatasaga Kalapu was a Western Samoan civil servant. He served as the first Speaker of the Legislative Assembly from 1957 to 1961.

== Biography ==
Kalapu first joined the civil service in 1921. He later spent ten years working for the Klinkmueller and Kronfeldt legal firm in Apia, before rejoining the civil service in the Samoan Affairs Department in 1947, later becoming chief interpreter for the government.

In November 1957 he was elected the first Speaker of the Legislative Assembly, replacing the High Commissioner, who had previously served as President of the Legislative Assembly. He served as Speaker until the 1961 elections, after which Speakers were elected from amongst the members of the Legislative Assembly.

In 2018, a new building for MLAs next to the Legislative Assembly was named after him.
