= 1973 Western Samoan general election =

← 1970	24 February 1973	1976 →

All 47 seats in the Legislative Assembly
	First party
Party	Independents
Last election	47 seats
Seats won	47
Seat change	Steady
Prime Minister before election
Tupua Tamasese Lealofi IV
Independent
Subsequent Prime Minister
Fiamē Mataʻafa Faumuina Mulinuʻu II
Independent

General elections were held in Western Samoa on 24 February 1973. All candidates ran as independents and voting was restricted to Faʻamatai and citizens of European origin ("individual voters"), with the matai electing 45 MPs and Europeans two. Following the election, Fiamē Mataʻafa Faumuina Mulinuʻu II became Prime Minister for a second term, having previously held the office between 1959 and 1970.

== Campaign ==
Prior to the elections, candidates were decided upon at meetings of chiefs. If there was unanimity, only one candidate would be put forward; if there were disagreements, multiple candidates would be nominated. A total of 160 candidates contested the elections, with twelve seats having only one candidate (seven of whom were incumbents), who were returned unopposed. Former Prime Minister Mata'afa, who held one of the four highest chiefly titles, was challenged by Aupito Tulaniu, an opponent of the domination of Samoan society by chiefs. His candidacy was regarded by several chiefs as the 'work of the devil'.

The incumbent government led by Tupua Tamasese had become increasingly unpopular since taking office following the 1970 elections. An increase in import duties led to rising food costs and car prices, whilst cabinet infighting and perceived lack of work ethic of some ministers had also been issues.

The Samoa Times reported that the election campaign saw candidates giving away food and money.

== Results ==
Twenty-eight of the forty-seven members were new to the Legislative Assembly, with only eleven incumbent MLAs in contested seats being re-elected. Minister of Education Tuala Paulo, Minister of Finance Tofa Siaosi, Minister of Justice Amoa Tausilia, Minister for the Post Office Fuimaono Moasope and the Speaker Magele Ate were all defeated.

In Gaga'ifomauga No. 1 the result was a tie between Tiapili Filisi and Timu Kolio. The outcome was decided by drawing lots, with Tiapili declared the winner.

Voting in Satupa'itea constituency was delayed until May due to the death of Asiata Lagolago, one of the candidates.

Party	Votes	%	Seats
Independents	7,241	100.00	47
Total	7,241	100.00	47
Valid votes	7,241	99.12	
Invalid/blank votes	64	0.88	
Total ballots cast		–	
Registered voters/turnout	10,075	–	
Source: Nohlen et al.

== Aftermath ==
Following the elections, the victory of Mapuilesua Malo in Palauli-le-Falefa was challenged by losing candidate Le Tagaloa Pita, who alleged that ten matai should not have been able to vote in the constituency. A recount was ordered by Chief Justice Gaven Donne, with Pita subsequently declared the winner.

Toleafoa Talitimu was elected Speaker with 28 votes, defeating Leaupepe Faimaala (12) and Teo Fetu (6). Fetu subsequently defeated Faimaala in the Deputy Speaker election by a margin of 27 votes to 18. Three candidates stood to be Prime Minister; incumbent Tupua Tamasese, former Prime Minister Fiame Mata'afa and Tufuga Efi. In the first round of voting, Mata'afa won with 23 votes; Efi received 13 and Tamasese 9. Mata'afa subsequently appointed a new cabinet.

Position	Minister
Prime Minister	Fiame Mata'afa
Minister for Agriculture	Muagututi'a Pinati
Minister for Education	Alfonso Philipp
Minister for Finance	Sam Saili
Minister for Health	Seiuli Taulafo
Minister of Justice	Tupua Tamasese
Minister of Lands	Lesatele Rapi
Minister for the Post Office and Radio	Tapua'i Ene
Minister for Works and Marine	Laumea Matolu II

Mata'afa died in May 1975, after which Tupua Tamasese was appointed as his replacement, also appointing a new cabinet. However, later in 1975 he sacked both Pinati and Saili. Minister for Works Aumua Ioane became the new Finance Minister, while Vaovasamanaia Filipo was appointed as the new Minister for Agriculture, and Tofaeono Tile as Minister for Works to replace Ioane.

Position	Minister
Prime Minister	Tupua Tamasese
Minister for Agriculture	Muagututia Pinati
Minister for Education	Alfonso Philipp
Minister for Finance	Sam Saili
Minister for Health	Seiuli Taulafo
Minister of Justice	Lilomaiava Niko
Minister for the Post Office and Radio	Fepuleai Samuelu
Minister for Works and Marine	Aumua Ioane

== See also ==
- List of members of the Legislative Assembly of Western Samoa (1973–1976)
