= Faalavaau Galu =

Samoan politician

Minister for the Post Office, Radio and Broadcasting
- In office 1957–1970
- Succeeded by: Fatialofa Momo'e

Member of the Legislative Assembly
- In office 1957–1973
- Succeeded by: Aumua Ioane
- Constituency: Falelatai & Samatau

Nominated Member of the Legislative Council
- In office 1939–1946

Personal details
- Born: 12 September 1902
- Died: 29 October 1975 (aged 73)

Faalavaau Galu (12 September 1902 – 29 October 1975) was a Western Samoan chief and politician. He was a member of the Legislative Assembly from 1957 until 1973, and served as Minister for the Post Office, Radio and Broadcasting between 1957 and 1970.

== Biography ==
Born in 1902, Galu was conferred with the Faalavaau title in 1923. During his youth he was an excellent cricketer and rugby player.

He joined the anti-colonial Mau movement, becoming its secretary. A member of the Fono of Faipule, he also served as the body's chair. In 1939 he was appointed to the Legislative Council, serving until 1946. After leaving the Council, he worked for the Union Company and I.H. Carruthers. In 1956 he was convicted of failing to account for goods at his employer and sentenced to six months in prison. However, after the money was repaid, his sentence was replaced with a £15 fine.

Galu returned to politics in 1957, when he was elected to the reconstituted Legislative Assembly. Following the elections, he was appointed Minister for the Post Office and Radio, with Broadcasting added to his portfolio in 1958. In 1960 he participated in the Constitutional Assembly and was one of the signatories of the new constitution. He was re-elected in 1961, 1964 and 1967, retaining his ministerial portfolio under Prime Minister Fiame Mata'afa following each election. Although he was re-elected again in 1970, Mata'afa lost the election for Prime Minister and Galu was not appointed to a post in the new cabinet. He did not contest the 1973 elections.

Galu died in October 1975 at the age of 73. He was survived by his wife and their four adopted daughters.
