= Magele Ate =

Samoan politician

Speaker of the Legislative Assembly
- In office 1967–1973
- Preceded by: Amoa Tausilia
- Succeeded by: Toleafoa Talitimu

Member of the Legislative Assembly
- In office 1961–1973
- Preceded by: Eti Alesana
- Constituency: Faasaleleaga No. 1

Personal details
- Born: 26 June 1921
- Died: 26 May 1982 (aged 60)

Magele Tagaileono Ate Penn (26 June 1921 – 26 May 1982) was a Western Samoan politician. He served as Speaker of the Legislative Assembly from 1967 to 1973.

== Biography ==
Ate worked for the New Zealand Reparation Estates. He originally had 'European' status, but changed to become Samoan.

In 1960 Ate was elected to the Constitutional Assembly that drew up the independence constitution, and was a signatory of the document. He was elected to the Legislative Assembly unopposed from the Faasaleleaga No. 1 constituency in 1961. Although, the result was subsequently overturned and a by-election ordered for 10 June, Ate was returned again. He was re-elected in 1964 and became Deputy Speaker. After being re-elected in 1967 he was elected Speaker. He remained Speaker after the 1970 elections. However, he lost his seat in the 1973 elections. He contested the 1976 elections, but failed to regain his seat.
