= Ulualofaiga Talamaivao Vaelaʻa =

Samoan politician

Minister for Health
- In office 1964–1967
- Preceded by: Tufuga Fatu
- Succeeded by: Luamanuvae Eti

Minister of Justice
- In office 1967–1970
- Preceded by: Tuatagaloa Leutele Teʻo
- Succeeded by: Tuala Paulo

Member of the Legislative Assembly
- In office 1954–1971
- Preceded by: Olaʻaiga Paʻu
- Constituency: Vaʻa-o-Fonoti

Personal details
- Born: 1902–1903
- Died: 5 September 1971 (aged 68); Motootua, Western Samoa

Ulualofaiga Talamaivao Vaelaʻa (1902 or 1903 – 5 September 1971) was a Western Samoan politician and paramount chief of Fagaloa. He served as a member of the Legislative Assembly from 1954 until his death, and as Minister for Health and Minister of Justice in the 1960s.

== Biography ==
Educated at Avele School, Vaelaʻa spent three years working for Burns Philp before joining the police. After six years in the police force, he worked for a sawmill and then for E.A. Coxon.

In 1954 he was elected to the Legislative Assembly from the Vaʻa-o-Fonoti constituency. He was re-elected in 1957 elections and was a member of the 1960 Constitutional Convention and a signatory of the independence constitution. He was re-elected again in 1961, and following the 1964 elections he was appointed Minister for Health. After the 1967 elections he was moved to Minister of Justice. Although he was re-elected in 1970, he was left out of the new cabinet.

He died in hospital in Motootua in September 1971 at the age of 68.
