= To'omata Lilomaiava Tua =

Samoan politician

Minister for Land and Land Registry
- In office 1959–1970
- Preceded by: Tualaulelei Mauri
- Succeeded by: Polataivao Fosi

Member for Agriculture
- In office 1956–1957
- Preceded by: Fiame Mata'afa

Member of the Legislative Assembly
- In office 1957–1970
- Succeeded by: Tui Samuelu
- Constituency: Salega
- In office 1951–1957
- Preceded by: Asiata Muese
- Constituency: Satupa'itea

Personal details
- Born: 10 July 1905
- Died: February 1970

To'omata Lilomaiava Tua (10 July 1905 – February 1970) was a Western Samoan chief and politician. He served as a member of the Legislative Assembly from 1951 and as Minister of Lands from 1959, holding both roles until his death in 1970.

== Biography ==
Born in 1905, Tua was conferred with the chiefly title To'omata in 1924. He became a member of the Fono of Faipule and served as its chairman.

He was elected to the Legislative Assembly from the Satupa'itea constituency in 1951. After being re-elected in 1954, he was appointed to the Executive Council. When a Member System was introduced in 1956, he was given the Agriculture portfolio. Although he was re-elected again in 1957, he was omitted from the Executive Council. However, when a full cabinet system was introduced in 1959, he was appointed Minister of Lands.

In 1960 he was a member of the Constitutional Assembly that drew up the independence constitution. He was re-elected in 1961, 1964 and 1967, retaining his ministerial portfolio on each occasion; in 1964 the role became Minister for Land and Land Registry.

Tua was re-elected in the February 1970 elections, but died before the Assembly convened to elect the Prime Minister. His death deprived incumbent Prime Minister Fiame Mata'afa of a majority in a tied vote, and led to Tupua Tamasese Lealofi IV becoming prime minister.
