= Percy Morgan =

Welsh cricketer

Personal information
- Full name: William Percival Morgan
- Born: 1 January 1905; Abercrave, Brecknockshire, Wales
- Died: 3 March 1983 (aged 78); Neath, Glamorgan, Wales
- Batting: Right-handed
- Bowling: Right-arm medium

Domestic team information
- Years: Team
- 1925: Glamorgan

Career statistics
Competition	FC
Matches	1
Runs scored	4
Batting average	2.00
100s/50s	–/–
Top score	4
Balls bowled	6
Wickets	–
Bowling average	–
5 wickets in innings	–
10 wickets in match	–
Best bowling	–
Catches/stumpings	–/–
- Source: Cricinfo, 26 June 2010

William 'Percy' Percival Morgan (1 January 1905 - 3 March 1983) was a Welsh cricketer. Morgan was a right-handed batsman who bowled right-arm medium pace. He was born at Abercrave, Brecknockshire.

Morgan represented Glamorgan in a single first-class in 1925 against Nottinghamshire at St. Helen's.

In 1935, he played 2 Minor Counties Championship matches for the Glamorgan Second XI against Oxfordshire and Dorset.

Morgan died at Neath, Glamorgan on 3 March 1983.
