= Frank Nelson (Western Samoan politician) =

Western Samoan politician

Minister of Works, Transport, Marine and Civil Aviation
- In office 1957–1967
- Preceded by: Harry Moors/Peter Plowman
- Succeeded by: Lesatele Rapi

Member of the Legislative Assembly
- In office 1957–1967
- Constituency: Individual voters

Personal details
- Born: 4 August 1917; Apia, Western Samoa
- Died: 5 January 1967 (aged 49); Apia, Western Samoa

Frank Clemens Frederick Nelson (4 August 1917 – 5 January 1967) was a Western Samoan politician. He served as a member of the Legislative Assembly and as Minister of Works, Transport, Marine and Civil Aviation from 1957 until his death.

== Biography ==
Nelson was born in Apia in 1917. He was educated at the Marist Brothers school in Apia and Sacred Heart College in Auckland. He worked for the New Zealand Reparation Estates between 1947 and 1950, before becoming secretary of O.F. Nelson & Co, remaining at the firm until 1955. A keen sportsman, he chaired the Apia Rugby Union management committee and was president of the Western Samoa Amateur Sports Federation.

In 1957 Nelson was elected to the Legislative Assembly as a member of the Progressive Citizens League. Following the elections, he was appointed Minister for Public Works and Road Transport. He was re-elected in 1961 and 1964, retaining his place in the cabinet after both elections.

Nelson died in Apia in January 1967 following a visit to the dentist. His funeral at the Immaculate Conception Cathedral was reportedly the largest in Apia's history.
