= Fred Betham =

Samoan politician

Secretary General of the South Pacific Commission
- In office 1971–1975
- Preceded by: Afoafouvale Misimoa
- Succeeded by: Macu Salato

Minister of Finance
- In office 1961–1970
- Preceded by: Eugene Paul
- Succeeded by: Tofa Siaosi

Member of the Legislative Assembly
- In office 1948–1971
- Succeeded by: Sam Saili
- Constituency: Individual Voters

Personal details
- Born: 11 April 1915 Apia, Western Samoa
- Died: 31 March 1984 (aged 68)

Gustav Frederick Dertag Betham OBE (11 April 1915 – 31 March 1984), also known by the Samoan name Fereti Misipita, was a Western Samoan politician and diplomat. He served as a member of the Legislative Assembly from 1948 to 1971 and as Minister of Finance from 1961 to 1970. In 1971 he was appointed Secretary General of the South Pacific Commission, a role he held for four years.

== Biography ==
Born in Apia in 1915 to Bertha and Montgomery Betham, Betham attended Newton West School in Auckland and then Seddon Memorial Technical College. He returned to Western Samoa to join the civil service, leaving after eight years to work in business, joining O.F. Nelson. An excellent tennis player, in 1939 he won the men's singles, the men's doubles and the mixed doubles with Olive Nelson, who he married in 1942. He later became president of the local tennis association. In World War II he was part of the Western Samoa Defence Force.

Betham was elected to the Legislative Assembly from the European constituency in 1948, and re-elected in 1951, 1954 and 1957. In 1953, he was awarded the Queen Elizabeth II Coronation Medal. As a member of the Legislative Assembly, he was part of the 1960 Constitutional Assembly that drew up the independence constitution, of which he was a signatory. After being re-elected again in 1961, Betham was appointed Minister of Finance. He was appointed an OBE in the 1962 New Year Honours and remained in the cabinet until the 1970 elections, when Tupua Tamasese replaced Fiame Mata'afa as prime minister.

In 1971 he was a candidate to become Secretary-General of the South Pacific Commission. After a tie in the first round of voting, his opponent Oala Oala-Rarua withdrew from the contest, allowing Betham to win. He served as Secretary General until 1975, and in 1976 was appointed High Commissioner of Western Samoa to New Zealand, a role he held until 1980.

He died in March 1984 at the age of 68.
