= 1954 Western Samoan general election =

Election in Western Samoa

General elections were held in Western Samoa on 13 April 1954.

== Electoral system ==
The 26-member Legislative Assembly consisted of the Administrator, six civil servants, twelve Samoans appointed by the Fono of Faipule, two Fautua (Samoan chiefs) and five members directly elected by people with European status, most of whom were part-Samoan.

== Results ==
=== European members ===
| Candidate | Votes | % | Notes |
|---|---|---|---|
| Harry Moors | 587 | 17.01 | Re-elected |
| Peter Plowman | 488 | 14.14 | Elected |
| Fred Betham | 465 | 13.48 | Re-elected |
| Arno Max Gurau | 448 | 12.99 | Re-elected |
| Percy Morgan | 437 | 12.67 | Elected |
| Jacob Helg | 379 | 10.99 | Unseated |
| Emil Fabricius | 276 | 8.00 | |
| Edward Westbrook | 157 | 4.55 | |
| W.E. Betham | 107 | 3.10 | |
| R. Latwer | 106 | 3.07 | |
| Total | 3,450 | 100.00 | |
Source: Pacific Islands Monthly

=== Samoan members ===
Two candidates for the Atua seat, Tuatagaloa Leutele Te'o and Fonoti Ioane received the same number of votes. It was decided that as the incumbent Te'o should remain the representative for the constituency, whilst Ioane would be made the twelfth, non-constituency member.

| Districts | Member |
|---|---|
| A'ana | Alipia Tusiata |
| Aiga-i-le-Tai | Leiataua Puipui |
| Atua | Tuatagaloa Leutele Te'o |
| Fa'asaleleaga | Gatoloai Peseta Sio |
| Gaga'emauga | Lealaiauloto Aso |
| Gaga'ifomauga | Tu'u Lolesio |
| Palauli | Tualaulelei Mauri |
| Satupa'itea | To'omata Lilomaiava Tua |
| Tuamasaga | Tofaeono Muliaga |
| Va'a-o-Fonoti | Talamaivao Vaelaa |
| Vaisigano | Tufuga Fatu |
| Twelfth seat | Fonoti Ioane |
Source: Pacific Islands Monthly

== Aftermath ==
In 1956 the Executive Council was reorganised and a Member System introduced. To'omata Lilomaiava Tua was appointed Member for Agriculture, Tuatagaloa Leutele Te'o as Member for Education, Fonoti Ioane as Member for Health, Tualaulelei Mauri as Member for Lands, Peter Plowman as Member for Transport and Communications, and Harry Moors as Member for Works.
