= Tupua Tamasese Lealofi IV =

2nd Prime Minister of Western Samoa

Tui Ātua Tupua Tamasese Lealofi IV
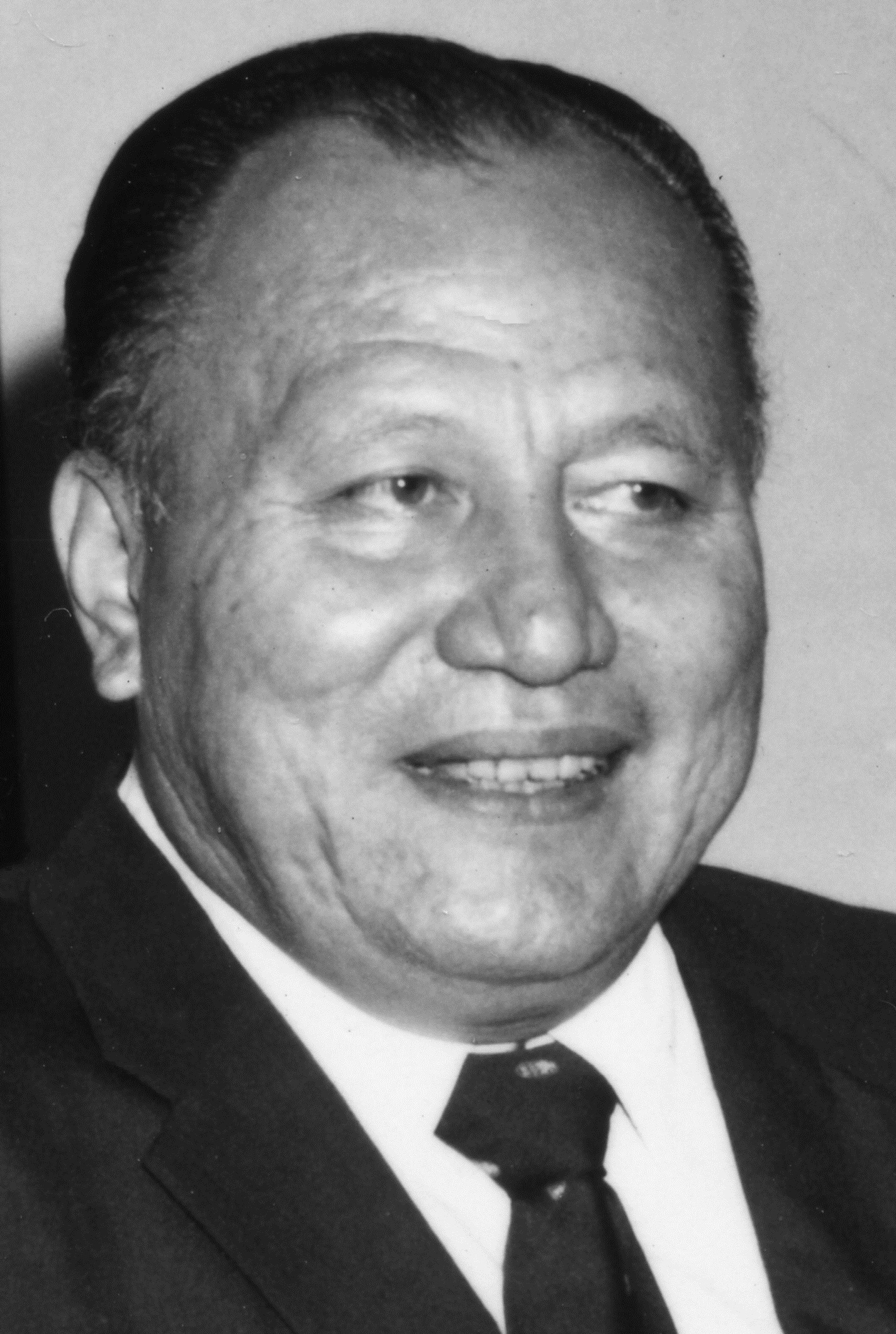

2nd Prime Minister of Western Samoa
- In office 21 May 1975 – 24 March 1976; Acting
- O le Ao O le Malo: Malietoa Tanumafili II
- Preceded by: Fiamē Mataʻafa Faumuina Mulinuʻu II
- Succeeded by: Tupuola Efi
- In office 25 February 1970 – 20 March 1973
- O le Ao O le Malo: Malietoa Tanumafili II
- Preceded by: Fiamē Mataʻafa Faumuina Mulinuʻu II
- Succeeded by: Fiamē Mataʻafa Faumuina Mulinuʻu II

Member of the Council of Deputies
- In office 1968–1970, 1976–1983

Minister of Justice
- In office 1973–1975
- Prime Minister: Fiamē Mataʻafa Faumuina Mulinuʻu II
- Preceded by: Amoa Tausilia
- Succeeded by: Lilomaiava Niko

Member of the Legislative Assembly
- In office 1970–1976
- Preceded by: Leutele Poutoa
- Constituency: Anoamaa East

Personal details
- Born: 8 May 1922 Apia, Western Samoa Trust Territory (Now Samoa)
- Died: 9 July 1983 (aged 61) Matautu, Western Samoa
- Party: Independent
- Spouse: Rita Lolani
- Children: 4
- Parent(s): Tupua Tamasese Lealofi III, Alaisalatemaota
- Education: Fiji School of Medicine

Tui Ātua Tupua Tamasese Lealofi IV (8 May 1922 – 9 July 1983) was the second prime minister of Samoa from 25 February 1970 to 20 March 1973 and again from 21 May 1975 to 24 March 1976. He held the title of Tupua Tamasese, one of the four main chiefly titles of Samoa (the Tama-a-Aiga) from 1965 until his death in 1983.

== Biography ==
Lealofi was born in Apia in May 1922, the eldest son of Mau movement leader Tupua Tamasese Lealofi III, who was killed by New Zealand Police in 1929. After studying at the Marist Brothers school and Malifa high school, he attended the Fiji School of Medicine between 1940 and 1945, qualifying as a medical practitioner. He then worked as a doctor for the Health Department. In 1965 he became Tupua Tamasese following the death of his uncle Tupua Tamasese Meaʻole. This entitled him to become a member of the Council of Deputies, to which he was elected in 1968.

In 1970 he resigned from the Council of Deputies to contest elections to the Legislative Assembly, and was elected in the Anoamaa East constituency. Following the elections, he was elected Prime Minister, defeating incumbent Fiame Mata'afa in the third round of voting. However, following the 1973 elections he was eliminated in the first round of voting for Prime Minister, and was succeeded by Mata'afa. Mata'afa subsequently appointed him as Minister of Justice.

Mata'afa died in 1975 and Lealofi was appointed by then Head of State, Malietoa Tanumafili II, as his replacement. Following the 1976 elections he was defeated in the vote for Prime Minister by his cousin, Tupuola Efi. He subsequently resigned from the Legislative Assembly and was elected to the Council of Deputies again.

Lealofi died in Matautu on Upolu Island in July 1983 at the age of 61.

Legislative Assembly of Samoa
Preceded by Leutele Vaafusuaga Poutoa	Member of Parliament for Anoama'a East; 1970–1976	Succeeded by Faamatuainu T. Mailei
Political offices
Preceded by Fiamē Mataʻafa Faumuina Mulinuʻu II	Prime Minister of Western Samoa; 1970–1973	Succeeded by Fiamē Mataʻafa Faumuina Mulinuʻu II
Preceded by Amoa Tausilia	Minister of Justice; 1973–1975	Succeeded by Lilomaiava Niko
Preceded by Fiamē Mataʻafa Faumuina Mulinuʻu II	Prime Minister of Western Samoa; Acting; 1975–1976	Succeeded by Tupuola Efi
Regnal titles
Preceded by Tupua Tamasese Meaʻole	Tupua Tamasese; 1962–1983	Succeeded by Tui Ātua Tupua Tamasese Efi
