= Member System =

Political system in British Malaya

The Member System, modeled on the cabinet system, was created by British authorities in the Federation of Malaya to provide self-governance. Like the Communities Liaison Committee, it drew on members of different communities, and was later described as setting a precedent for the powersharing multiracial Malayan and Malaysian cabinets post-independence.

At 1951, Sir Henry Gurney, the British High Commissioner in Malaya announced the members, their duty started at April 1951 until June 1955, before the election.

3 portfolios still holding by British, they are Housing and Public Works by J. D. Mead, Industry and Social Relations, and Economic Affairs.

| Portrait | Holder | Portfolio |
|---|---|---|
| | Onn Jaafar | Home Affairs |
| | E. E. C. Thuraisingham | Education |
| | Lee Tiang Keng | Health |
| | Tunku Yaacob ibni Sultan Abdul Hamid | Agriculture and Forestry |
| | Dato' Sir Mahmud Mat | Land, Mining and Communications |
3 Portfolios were offered to citizens of Malaya at 1954.
| | Nik Ahmad Kamil | Local Government, Housing and Urban Planning |
| | H. S. Lee | Transportation |
| | Dr. Ismail Abdul Rahman | Natural Resources |
