= List of speakers of the Legislative Assembly of Samoa =

The Speaker of the Legislative Assembly of Samoa is the presiding officer of Legislative Assembly of Samoa, elected by all members of the assembly for a term of 5 years.

== Presidents of the Legislative Assembly ==
From 1948 to 1957 the High Commissioner served as President of the Legislative Assembly.

Name	Period
Francis William Voelcker	1948–1949
Guy Richardson Powles	1949–1957

== Speakers of the Legislative Assembly ==
Name	Took office	Left office	Notes
Luafatasaga Kalapu	1957	1961	
Amoa Tausilia	1961	1967	
Magele Ate	1967	1973	
Toleafoa Talitimu	1973	1976	
Leota Leuluaiali'i Ituau Ale	1976	1979	
Dr Tu'u'u Faleto'ese	1979	1982	'Tunu Faletolu'
Nonumalo Nanai Leulumoega Sofara	1982	1988	
A'eau Peniamina Le'avai	1988	1991	
Fatu Vaili Afamasaga	7 May 1991	1995	
Leaupepe Toleafoa Faafisi	1996	2006	
Tolofuaivalelei Falemoe Lei’ataua	22 April 2006	18 March 2011	
La'aulialemalietoa Leuatea Polataivao Fosi	18 March 2011	16 March 2016	
Leaupepe Toleafoa Faafisi	16 March 2016	9 April 2021	
Papaliʻi Liʻo Taeu Masipau	24 May 2021	16 September 2025	
Auapaʻau Mulipola Aloitafua	16 September 2025	Incumbent	
