= 1951 Western Samoan general election =

General elections were held in Western Samoa on 27 April 1951. Although the 1948 elections had been fought by two political parties, the 1951 elections saw all candidates run as independents.

== Electoral system ==
The Legislative Assembly included twelve Samoans elected by the Fono of Faipule and five Europeans members directly elected by people with European status, which included people of mixed European and Samoan descent. Prior to the elections, Chinese residents had been granted European status, with 164 registering to vote.

== Results ==
=== European members ===
Candidate	Votes	%	Notes
Eugene Paul	704	18.16	Re-elected
Fred Betham	640	16.51	Re-elected
Arno Max Gurau	628	16.20	Elected
Harry Moors	509	13.13	Elected
Jacob Helg	476	12.28	Re-elected
Alfred Smyth	400	10.32	
W.F. Betham	153	3.95	
Edward Westbrook	151	3.90	
Joseph Stowers	125	3.22	
R. Latwer	90	2.32	
Total	3,876	100.00	
Source: Pacific Islands Monthly

=== Samoan members ===
Districts	Member
A'ana	Thomas Nauer
Aiga-i-le-Tai	Taupa'u Semu
Atua	Tuatagaloa Leutele Te'o
Fa'asaleleaga	Vui Manu'a
Gaga'emauga	Tuala Tulo
Gaga'ifomauga	Timu Kolio
Palauli	Tualaulelei Mauri
Satupa'itea	To'omata Lilomaiava Tua
Tuamasaga North	Mataia Europa
Tuamasaga South	Anapu Solofa
Va'a-o-Fonoti	Ola'aiga Pa'u
Vaisigano	Masoe Tulele
Source: Meti
