= 1957 Western Samoan general election =

General elections were held in Western Samoa on 15 November 1957.

== Background ==
A Constitutional Convention was held in 1954, which recommended the merger of the 41-member Fono of Faipule and the 29-member Legislative Assembly into a new 48-member Legislative Assembly with 41 elected Samoan members, five elected European members and two ministers (the Minister of Finance and Minister of Justice), with the number of Samoan members rising to 45 in future in line with population increases. The 41 Samoan members would be elected from the same constituencies used for the Fono of Faipule, with voting restricted to matais. The five European members would be elected from a single nationwide constituency by universal suffrage for people with European status; of the 1,432 people with European status, around 175 were European, 125 Chinese and 1,100 mixed-race.

The proposals also introduced cabinet government, with a Premier chosen by the Legislative Assembly, and proposed making the two Fautuas, Tupua Tamasese Meaʻole and Malietoa Tanumafili II, joint heads of state for life, which was approved by the vast majority of the 170 delegates and opposed by only around six. The decision provoked a furious response from Fiame Mata'afa Faumuina Mulinu'u II, one of the other four paramount chiefs alongside Tamasese and Malietoa, and on the final day of the convention, Mata'afa announced that he would withdraw from public life in protest at the decision.

== Campaign ==
In 31 of the 41 Samoan seats, there was only one candidate, resulting in no vote taking place and the candidate being returned unopposed. The five European seats were contested by 11 candidates, including all five incumbent MLAs. Five of the European candidates (incumbent Peter Plowman and four others) ran as the Progressive Citizens League, with the rest standing as independents.

== Results ==
In the Samoan seats, six of the incumbent MLCs were re-elected. In the European seats, the Progressive Citizens League won four of the five seats, with three of the five incumbents losing their seats. Around 1,100 of the 1,432 European voters voted.

=== European seats ===
Candidate	Party	Votes	%	Notes
Eugene Paul	Progressive Citizens League	811	15.98	Elected
Frank Nelson	Progressive Citizens League	614	12.10	Elected
Fred Betham	Independent	592	11.67	Re-elected
Peter Plowman	Progressive Citizens League	563	11.09	Re-elected
Hans Joachim Keil II	Progressive Citizens League	562	11.07	Elected
Harry Moors	Independent	561	11.05	Unseated
Kurt Meyer	Progressive Citizens League	518	10.21	
Arno Max Gurau	Independent	278	5.48	Unseated
Percy Morgan	Independent	235	4.63	Unseated
July Ah Mu	Independent	171	3.37	
Z.F. Betham	Independent	170	3.35	
Total		5,075	100.00	
Total votes		1,100	–	
Registered voters/turnout		1,432	76.82	
Source: Pacific Islands Monthly

== Aftermath ==
Following the elections, Luafatasaga Kalapu was elected as the first Speaker. An Executive Council of six ministers was appointed. Despite his previous announcement that he would withdraw from public life, Fiame Mata'afa Faumuina Mulinu'u II was amongst its members.

Position	Minister
Minister of Agriculture	Fiame Mata'afa Faumuina Mulinu'u II
Minister of Economic Development	Eugene Paul
Minister of Education	Tuatagaloa Leutele Te'o
Minister of Lands	Tualaulelei Mauri
Minister for the Post Office and Radio	Faalavaau Galu
Minister for Public Works and Road Transport	Frank Nelson

Formal cabinet government was introduced in 1959, with the new government sworn in on 1 October 1959, headed by Mata'afa as Western Samoa's first Prime Minister.

Position	Member
Minister of Agriculture	Tualaulelei Mauri
Minister of Education	Tuatagaloa Leutele Te'o
Minister of Finance	Eugene Paul
Minister of Health	Luamanuvae Eti
Minister of Justice	Anapu Solofa
Minister of Lands	To'omata Lilomaiava Tua
Minister for the Post Office and Radio	Faalavaau Galu
Minister for Public Works and Road Transport	Frank Nelson

== See also ==
- List of members of the Legislative Assembly of Western Samoa (1957–1961)
