= 1961 Western Samoan general election =

- 4 February 1961

All 46 seats in the Legislative Assembly
	First party
Party	Independents
Last election	46 seats
Seats won	46
Seat change	Steady
Prime Minister before election
Fiamē Mataʻafa Faumuina Mulinuʻu II
Independent
Subsequent Prime Minister
Fiamē Mataʻafa Faumuina Mulinuʻu II
Independent

General elections were held in Western Samoa on 4 February 1961. They had originally been planned for November 1960, but were postponed by three months.

== Electoral system ==
The Legislative Assembly had 46 elected members, of which 41 were Samoans elected in single-member constituencies (with voting limited to matais, and five were Europeans elected form a single national constituency.

== Campaign ==
In 21 of the 41 Samoan constituencies there was only one candidate, who was returned unopposed, whilst two had no candidates. Elections went ahead in the remaining 18 constituencies, with by-elections held for the two vacant seats in March.

Although the number of voters on the European roll dropped by around half compared to the 1957 elections, eight candidates contested the five available seats.

== Results ==
=== European seats ===
Candidate	Notes
Fred Betham	Re-elected
Arno Max Gurau	Elected
Hans Joachim Keil II	Re-elected
Frank Nelson	Re-elected
Peter Plowman	Re-elected
T.M. Allen	
William Betham	
Percy Morgan	
Source: Pacific Islands Monthly

== Aftermath ==
Following the elections, petitions were submitted to the High Court regarding alleged malpractice in the Faasaleleaga I, Palaluli East, Faleata West and European constituencies. The petition by losing candidate William Betham to have the European results annulled on the basis that 55 voters had been added to the voter roll after registration closed was dismissed, with the judge stating that it was not an irregularity and would not have affected the results.

Former Minister of Agriculture Tualaulelei Mauri submitted a petition seeking to overturn his 46–42 vote defeat by Afoafouvale Misimoa in Palauli East, where he claimed that a death oath had been placed on voters by a local chief if Misimoa was not elected. However, his case was dismissed due to contradictory evidence. The petition concerning the result in Faasaleleaga I (Magele Ate had been elected unopposed) was successful, with a by-election ordered for 10 June.

=== Government formation ===
A government was appointed by Prime Minister Fiame Mata'afa Faumuina Mulinu'u II.

Position	Minister
Minister for Agriculture	Asiata Lagolago
Minister for Education	Tuatagaloa Leutele Te'o
Minister for Finance	Fred Betham
Minister for Health	Tufuga Fatu
Minister of Justice	Anapu Solofa
Minister for Lands	To'omata Lilomaiava Tua
Minister for the Post Office, Radio and Broadcasting	Faalavaau Galu
Minister for Works	Frank Nelson

== See also ==
- List of members of the Legislative Assembly of Western Samoa (1961–1964)
