= 1964 Western Samoan general election =

General election held in Samoa

← 1961	4 April 1964	1967 →

All 47 seats in the Legislative Assembly
	First party
Party	Independents
Last election	46 seats
Seats won	47
Seat change	▲1
Prime Minister before election
Fiamē Mataʻafa Faumuina Mulinuʻu II
Independent
Subsequent Prime Minister
Fiamē Mataʻafa Faumuina Mulinuʻu II
Independent

General elections were held in Western Samoa on 4 April 1964, the first since independence in 1962. All candidates ran as independents. Following the elections, Fiamē Mataʻafa Faumuina Mulinuʻu II remained prime minister.

== Electoral system ==
There were two voter rolls; one for indigenous Samoans (which was restricted to Faʻamatai) and one for non-indigenous citizens, known as "individual voters". People of mixed ancestry could choose which roll to register on. As women rarely gained matai titles, it was unusual for women to be able to vote or stand for election in the Samoan seats.

Prior to the elections, the number of elected members was increased from 46 to 47; the number of Samoan seats was increased from 41 to 45, and the number of non-indigenous seats reduced from five to two. Only around 7,000 of the adult population of 45,000 was able to vote.

== Campaign ==
A total of 107 candidates contested the elections, with only one female candidate, Lefine Satia in Faasaleleaga 3. Prime Minister Mata'afa was challenged in his Lotofaga constituency by former MLA Fonoti Ioane.

Fourteen candidates in the Samoan constituencies were returned unopposed. Only three candidates contested the two-seat individual voter constituency, all of which were incumbent MLAs.

== Results ==
27 of the 47 elected MLAs were new to the legislature. Voter turnout was around 90% for individual voters.

Party	Votes	%	Seats
Independents	4,967	100.00	47
Total	4,967	100.00	47
Valid votes	4,967	98.36	
Invalid/blank votes	83	1.64	
Total ballots cast		–	
Registered voters/turnout	6,979	–	
Source: Nohlen et al.

== Aftermath ==
Following the elections, Mata'afa was unanimously re-elected as prime minister by the Legislative Assembly. He then appointed a nine-member cabinet, including three new ministers, Papaliʻi Poumau, Ulualofaiga Talamaivao Vaelaʻa and Laufili Time.

Position	Minister
Prime Minister	Fiamē Mataʻafa
Minister for Agriculture	Laufili Time
Minister for Education	Papaliʻi Poumau
Minister for Finance	Fred Betham
Minister for Health	Ulualofaiga Talamaivao
Minister of Justice	Tuatagaloa Leutele Te'o
Minister for Land and Land Registry	To'omata Lilomaiava Tua
Minister for the Post Office, Radio and Broadcasting	Faalavaau Galu
Minister for Works and Transport	Frank Nelson

== See also ==
- List of members of the Legislative Assembly of Western Samoa (1964–1967)
