= 1967 Western Samoan general election =

- 25 February 1967

All 47 seats in the Fono
| | First party |
|---|---|
| Party | Independents |
| Last election | 47 seats |
| Seats won | 47 |
| Seat change | Steady |
Prime Minister before election
Fiame Mataʻafa Faumuina Mulinuʻu II
Independent
Subsequent Prime Minister
Fiame Mataʻafa Faumuina Mulinuʻu II
Independent

General elections were held in Western Samoa on 25 February 1967. All candidates ran as independents and voting was restricted to Faʻamatai and citizens of European origin ("individual voters"), with the Matai electing 45 MPs and Europeans two. Following the election, Fiamē Mataʻafa Faumuina Mulinuʻu II remained Prime Minister.

== Campaign ==
A total of 126 candidates contested the 45 Samoan seats, with five running in the individual voter seats.

Although voting was restricted to matais, the ability of traditional chiefs to create new matai led to significant changes in voter demographics in some areas, with the number of matais more than doubling since 1961. In Vaisigano No. 1 constituency, the number of matais increased from 139 in 1965 to over 1,400 by the 1967 elections. Trucks had been sent out to collect people and register them as matai, including many women, who were traditionally rarely made matai.

== Results ==
Sixteen MLAs lost their seats, including Minister of Education Papali'i Poumau. Surprising defeats included Afoafouvale Misimoa in Palauli East and Tufuga Efi in Vaisigano No. 1.

| Party | Votes | % | Seats |
|---|---|---|---|
| Independents | 7,394 | 100.00 | 47 |
| Total | 7,394 | 100.00 | 47 |
| Valid votes | 7,394 | 99.14 | |
| Invalid/blank votes | 64 | 0.86 | |
| Total ballots cast | | – | |
| Registered voters/turnout | 8,184 | – | |
Source: Nohlen et al.

== Aftermath ==
Following the elections, members of the Legislative Assembly elected Magele Ate as Speaker and Tuala Paulo as Deputy Speaker. Fiame Mata'afa was re-elected as Prime Minister, and formed an eight-member cabinet on 17 March, including three new ministers, Luamanuvae Eti, Lesatele Rapi and Tuaopepe Tame.

| Position | Minister |
|---|---|
| Prime Minister | Fiame Mata'afa |
| Minister for Agriculture | Laufili Time |
| Minister for Education | Tuaopepe Tame |
| Minister for Finance | Fred Betham |
| Minister for Health | Luamanuvae Eti |
| Minister of Justice | Ulualofaiga Talamaivao |
| Minister for Land and Land Registry | To'omata Lilomaiava Tua |
| Minister for the Post Office, Radio and Broadcasting | Faalavaau Galu |
| Minister for Works and Transport | Lesatele Rapi |

== See also ==
- List of members of the Legislative Assembly of Western Samoa (1967–1970)
