= 1970 Western Samoan general election =

- 7 February 1970

All 47 seats in the Legislative Assembly
	First party
Party	Independent
Last election	47 seats
Seats won	47
Seat change	Steady
Prime Minister before election
Fiamē Mataʻafa Faumuina Mulinuʻu II
Independent
Subsequent Prime Minister
Tupua Tamasese Lealofi IV
Independent

General elections were held in Western Samoa on 7 February 1970. All candidates ran as independents, with voting restricted to Faʻamatai and citizens of European origin ("individual voters"), with the matais electing 45 MPs and Europeans two. Following the election, Tupua Tamasese Lealofi IV became prime minister.

== Background ==
A parliamentary debate on introducing universal suffrage was held on 27 March 1969. The motion by Letele Taneolevao Siaosi, the youngest member of parliament, would still limit candidacy to the 8,500 matais, but allow all citizens over the age of 21 (numbering over 30,000) to vote in elections. Prior to 1967 elections, the number of matais was increased significantly, as candidates seeking to increase their vote were able to bestow titles on people to create new matai. Following the elections, a law was introduced that prohibited conferring of a matai title on anyone younger than 21.

Although Prime Minister Fiamē Mataʻafa Faumuina Mulinuʻu II had been in favour of universal suffrage during the 1954 and 1960 constitutional conventions, he opposed the motion, arguing that voters had approved limiting suffrage to matais in the 1961 constitutional referendum, which had been held under universal suffrage. Members of the Legislative Assembly voted 37–6 against the motion.

== Campaign ==
Over 150 candidates contested the elections. Fifteen candidates were returned unopposed, including Faimaala Filipo, who became Western Samoa's first female MP, and Prime Minister Fiamē Mataʻafa.

== Results ==
Twenty-one of the forty-seven elected members were new to the Legislative Assembly.

Party	Votes	%	Seats
Independents	7,038	100.00	47
Total	7,038	100.00	47
Valid votes	7,038	98.67	
Invalid/blank votes	95	1.33	
Total ballots cast		–	
Registered voters/turnout	9,968	–	
Source: Nohlen et al.

== Aftermath ==
The newly elected Legislative Assembly met for the first time on 25 February. In the first round of the election for prime minister, Fiamē Mataʻafa received 19 votes, Tupua Tamasese Lealofi IV 17 and Tufuga Efi 10. The second ballot saw Mata'afa and Tupua both receive 23 votes. A third round of voting was held the following day, which Tupua won by 25 votes to 20. It was reported that Mata'afa would almost certainly have won in the second round had one of his supporters, To'omata Lilomaiava Tua, not died the previous week.

Tupua's new cabinet consisted entirely of first-time ministers.

Position	Minister
Prime Minister	Tupua Tamasese Lealofi IV
Minister for Agriculture	Asi Leavasa
Minister for Education	Amoa Tausilia
Minister for Finance	Tofa Siaosi
Minister for Health	Fuimaono Moasope
Minister of Justice	Tuala Paulo
Minister for Land and Land Registry	Polataivao Fosi
Minister for the Post Office, Radio and Broadcasting	Fatialofa Momoʻe
Minister for Works and Transport	Tufuga Efi

A cabinet reshuffle took place in March 1971 when Fatialofa Momoʻe resigned. Vaʻai Kolone was brought into the government as Minister of Health, with Fuimaono Moasope becoming Minister for the Post Office, Radio and Broadcasting in place of Momoʻe. Minister of Justice Tuala Paulo and Minister for Education Amoa Tausilia also exchanged portfolios.

== See also ==
- List of members of the Legislative Assembly of Western Samoa (1970–1973)
