= Fiamē Mataʻafa Faumuina Mulinuʻu II =

1st Prime Minister of Western Samoa

Fiamē Mataʻafa Faumuina Mulinuʻu II CBE
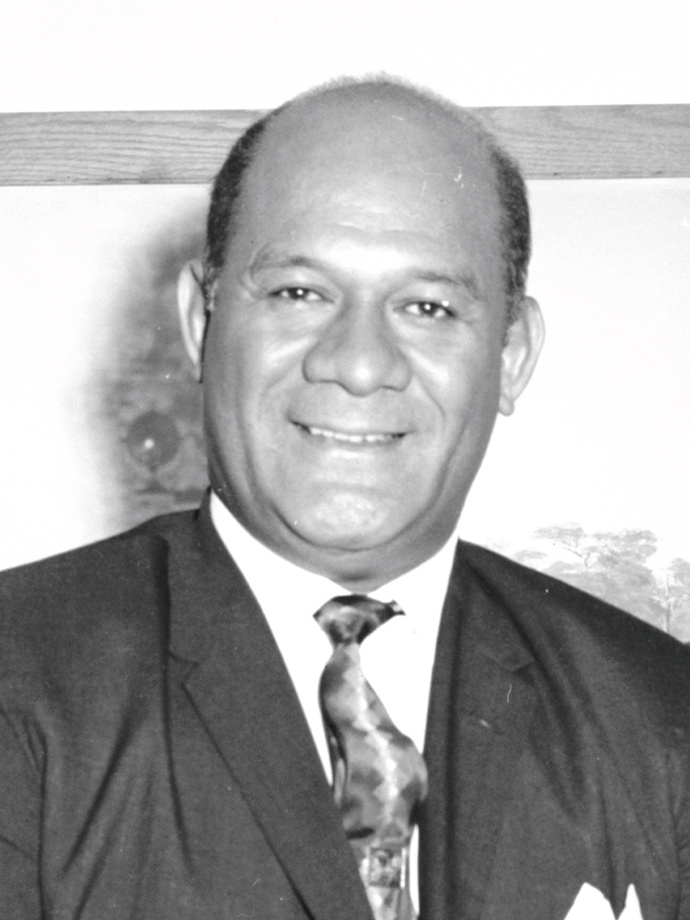
- Mata'afa in 1962

1st Prime Minister of Western Samoa
- In office 20 March 1973 – 20 May 1975
- O le Ao O le Malo: Malietoa Tanumafili II
- Preceded by: Tupua Tamasese Lealofi IV
- Succeeded by: Tupua Tamasese Lealofi IV (Acting); Tupuola Efi
- In office 1 October 1959 – 25 February 1970
- O le Ao O le Malo: Malietoa Tanumafili II (1962–1970); Tupua Tamasese Meaʻole (1962–1963)
- Preceded by: Office established Eugene Paul as Leader of Government Business)
- Succeeded by: Tupua Tamasese Lealofi IV

Minister of Agriculture
- In office 1957–1959
- Preceded by: Toʻomata Lilomaiava Tua
- Succeeded by: Tualaulelei Mauri

Member of the Legislative Assembly
- In office 1957 — 20 May 1975
- Succeeded by: Laulu Fetauimalemau Mataʻafa
- Constituency: Lotofaga

Personal details
- Born: 5 August 1921 Upolu, Western Samoa Trust Territory (present-day Samoa)
- Died: 20 May 1975 (aged 53) Apia, Samoa
- Party: Independent
- Spouse: Laulu Fetauimalemau Mata'afa
- Children: Fiamē Naomi Mataʻafa
- Occupation: Paramount Chief 'Tamaʻaiga 1

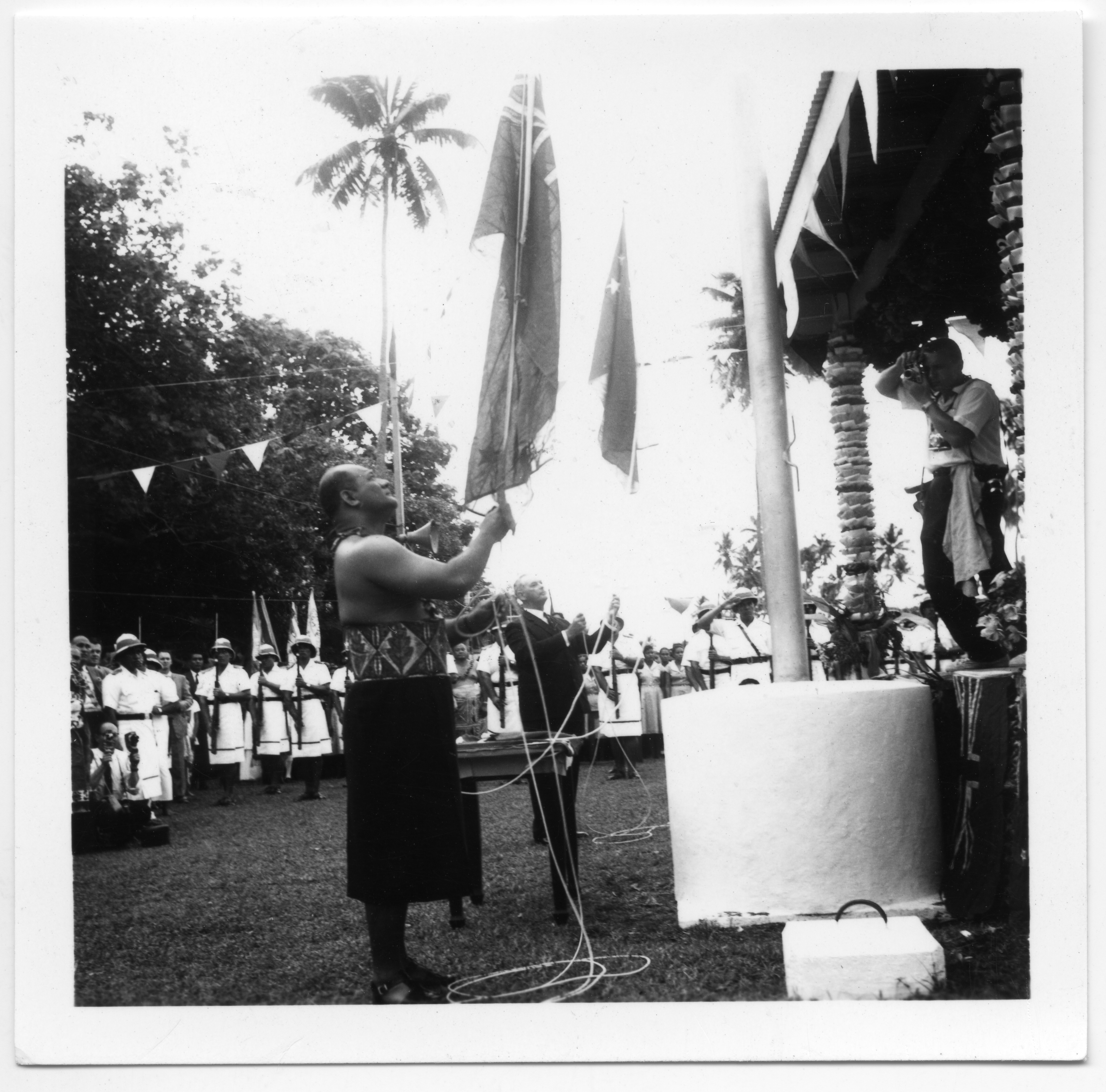
Mataʻafa and New Zealand Prime minister Keith Holyoake lower the trustee flags on Samoan Independence Day, 1 January 1962.

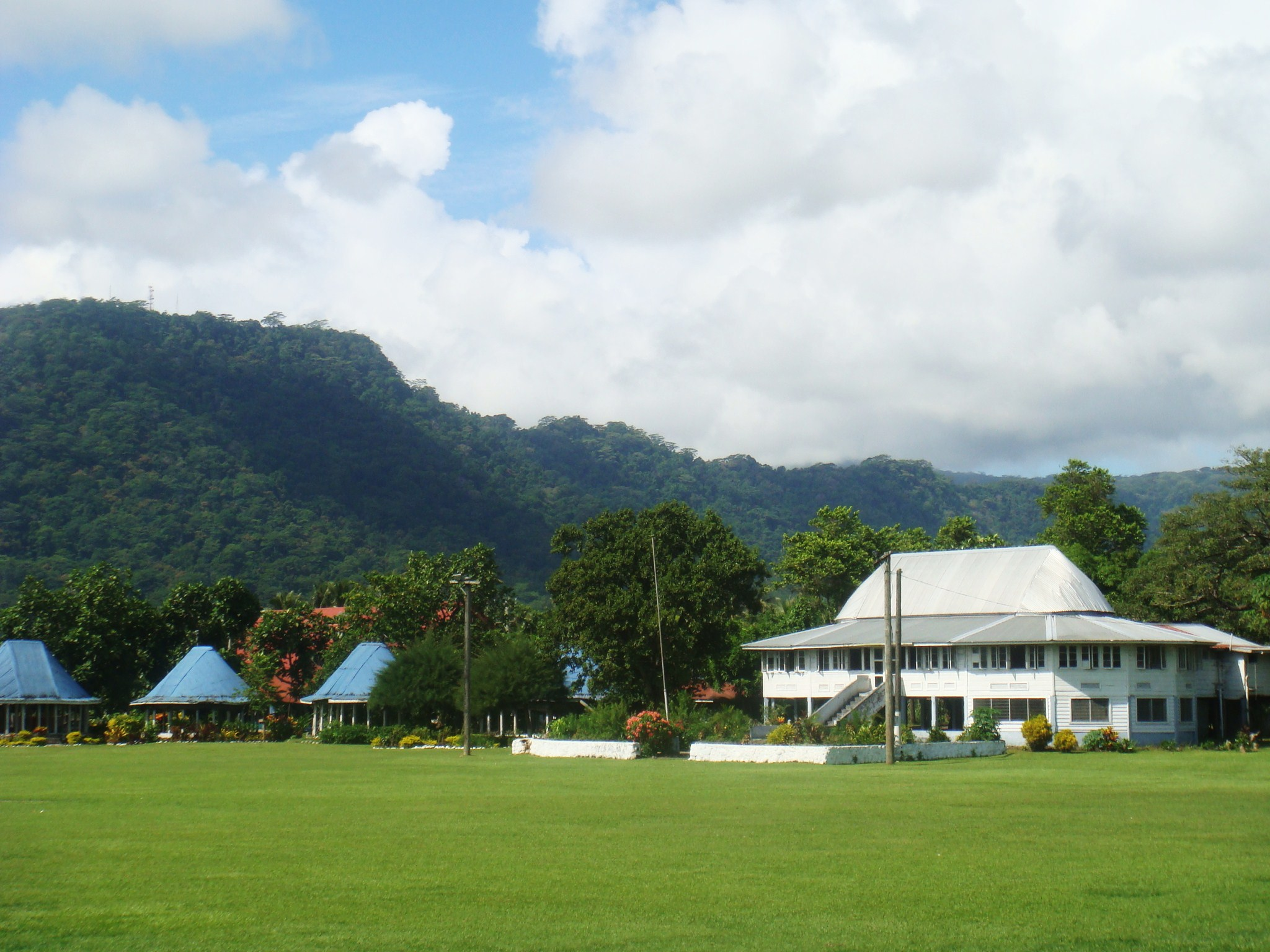
Residence in Lepea village, home of his matai chief title Faumuina.

Fiamē Mataʻafa Faumuina Mulinuʻu II CBE (5 August 1921 – 20 May 1975) was a Samoan paramount chief and politician. The holder of the Mataʻafa title, one of the four main Samoan chieftainships, he became the first prime minister of Samoa in 1959, serving until 1970. He held the position again from 1973 until his death in 1975.

== Biography ==
Mata'afa was born in 1921, the son of Paramount Chief Mata'afa Faumuina Fiame Mulinu'u I. He was educated at the Marist Brothers school in Apia. He married Laulu Fetauimalemau Mata'afa, a teacher educated in New Zealand and who later became Samoa's High Commissioner (1993–1997) to New Zealand. He was bestowed with the Fiame title in 1948, and also became a Faumuina. When his father died in 1948, he acceded to the Mata'afa title. He was a senior grade rugby player and President of the Western Samoan Boys' Brigade.

After it was agreed in the 1954 Constitutional Convention that two of the four paramount chiefs, Tupua Tamasese Meaʻole and Malietoa Tanumafili II, should be made joint heads of state for life, he announced that he would withdraw from public life. However, he later backed down and contested the 1957 elections to the Legislative Assembly, winning the Lotofaga seat.

Following the elections, Mata'afa was appointed to the Executive Council as Minister of Agriculture. When formal cabinet government was introduced in 1959, he became the first Prime Minister, defeating Leader of Government Business Eugene Paul and Tualaulelei Mauri in a vote. He was appointed a Commander of the Order of the British Empire in the 1960 Queen's Birthday Honours.

Mata'afa was re-elected Prime Minister following the 1961 elections, leading the country to independence in 1962. He was re-elected again following elections in 1964 and 1967. However, after the 1970 elections, he was defeated by Tupua Tamasese Lealofi IV by 25 votes to 20 in the third round of voting. It was reported that he would have probably won in the second round (which was tied at 23 votes each) if one of his supporters, To'omata Lilomaiava Tua, had not died the previous week.

In February 1966, Mata'afa ordered that the sport of cricket be banned on every day except Wednesdays and Saturdays, because of the "lackadaisical approach" taken to the clean-up after a cyclone.

Following the 1973 elections, Mata'afa returned as Prime Minister, defeating Lealofi and Tupuola Efi in the first round of voting. He served as Prime Minister until his death in May 1975. His wife Laulu won the subsequent by-election for his Lotofaga seat. His daughter Fiamē Naomi Mataʻafa also later became an MP, and served as Deputy Prime Minister of Samoa from 2016 until her resignation in 2020 after which she would end up as Samoa's first female Prime Minister in 2021.

Legislative Assembly of Samoa
Legislature established	Member of Parliament for Lotofaga; 1962–1975	Succeeded by Laulu Fetauimalemau Mataʻafa
Political offices
Preceded by Toʻomata Lilomaiava Tua	Minister of Agriculture; 1957–1959	Succeeded by Tualaulelei Mauri
New office	Prime Minister of Western Samoa; 1959–1970	Succeeded by Tupua Tamasese Lealofi IV
Preceded by Tupua Tamasese Lealofi IV	Prime Minister of Western Samoa; 1973–1975	Succeeded by Tupua Tamasese Lealofi IV
