= Fono of Faipule =

The Fono of Faipule was a legislature in Western Samoa during the colonial era. It consisted of representatives (faipule) from each district.

== History ==
The Fono was established in 1873 and was initially the lower house in a bicameral legislature; the Fono of Taʻimua was the upper house and consisted of the highest-ranking chiefs. The legislature was abolished by the German authorities in 1905, but the Fono was subsequently reformed as an advisory body that met twice a year at Mulinuʻu.

The Fono was legally recognised by the New Zealand authorities in 1923, and was used by the Administrator to consult on Samoan affairs. The faipule were nominated by chiefs in each district; if the chiefs could not agree, they were to submit two or three names to the Administrator, who would make the final decision.

Following a 'goodwill mission' to Samoa by representatives of the new Labour government of New Zealand in July 1936, the Samoans were promised the right to elect the Fono. The first elections subsequently took place in September, with representatives of the Mau movement winning 31 of the 39 seats. The newly elected Fono met on 30 September. The members of the previous Fono (which still had 18 months of its term remaining) were also in attendance. The first session ended with the decision that members of the old Fono would resign.

The new Fono requested that elections to the Fono should be formalised in legislation, abolishing the previous system of appointment. As a result, the Legislative Council passed the Faipule Election Ordinance in 1939, which provided for elections to a 41-seat Fono, although voting rights were only given to matai (family heads).

When the Legislative Assembly was established in 1947, the Fono was given the right to choose 11 of its 26 members, who sat alongside the Administrator, three fautau (leading chiefs), six civil servants and five elected Europeans. After one of the three fautau died in 1948, the Fono successfully petitioned to increase the number of members it could nominate to 12.

The Fono was abolished in 1957 by an amendment to the Samoa Act by the New Zealand government, which also increased Samoan representation in the Legislative Assembly and gave increased power to the Executive Council.
