= Legislative Assembly of Samoa =

Parliament of Samoa

Legislative Assembly of Samoa Fono Aoao Faitulafono a Samoa
- 18th Parliament

Type
- Type: Unicameral

History
- Founded: 1 January 1962

Leadership
- O le Ao o le Malo: Tuimalealiʻifano Vaʻaletoʻa Sualauvi II since 21 July 2017
- Speaker: Auapaʻau Mulipola Aloitafua, FAST since 16 September 2025
- Deputy Speaker: Afamasaga Leone Mati, FAST since 16 September 2025
- Prime Minister: Laʻauli Leuatea Schmidt, FAST since 16 September 2025
- Leader of the Opposition: Tuilaʻepa Saʻilele Malielegaoi, HRPP since 5 July 2023

Structure
- Seats: 52
- Political groups: Government (34): FAST (34); Official opposition (13): HRPP (13); Others (5): SUP (3); Independents (2)
- Length of term: Up to 5 years

Elections
- Voting system: First-past-the-post
- Last election: 29 August 2025
- Next election: By 2030

Meeting place
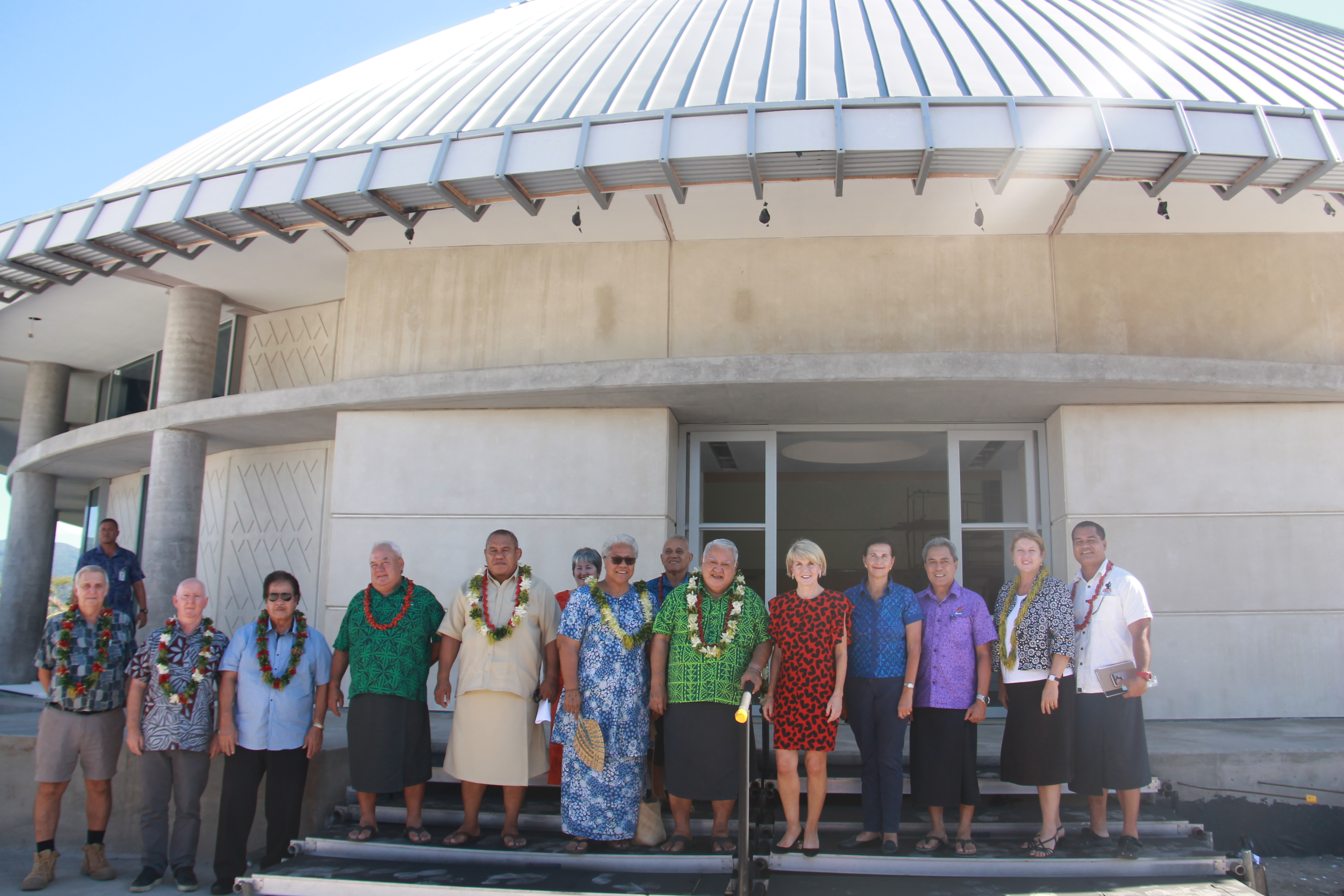
- Maota, Tiafau, Apia

Website
- www.palemene.ws

The Legislative Assembly (Samoan: Fono Aoao Faitulafono a Samoa), also known as the Parliament of Samoa (Samoan: Palemene o Samoa), is the national legislature of Samoa, seated at Apia, where the country's central administration is situated. Samoan Parliament is composed of two parts: the O le Ao o le Malo (head of state) and the Legislative Assembly. The 18th Parliament was inaugurated on 16 September 2025.

In the Samoan language, the Legislative Assembly of Samoa is sometimes referred to as the Samoan Fono while the government of the country is referred to as the Malo. The word fono is a Samoan and Polynesian term for councils or meetings great and small and applies to national assemblies and legislatures, as well as local village councils.

The modern government of Samoa exists on a national level alongside the country's fa'amatai indigenous chiefly system of governance and social organisation. The O le Ao o le Malo can summon and call together the Legislative Assembly, and can prorogue or dissolve Parliament, in order to either end a parliamentary session or call a general election on behalf of the Prime Minister of Samoa.

== History ==
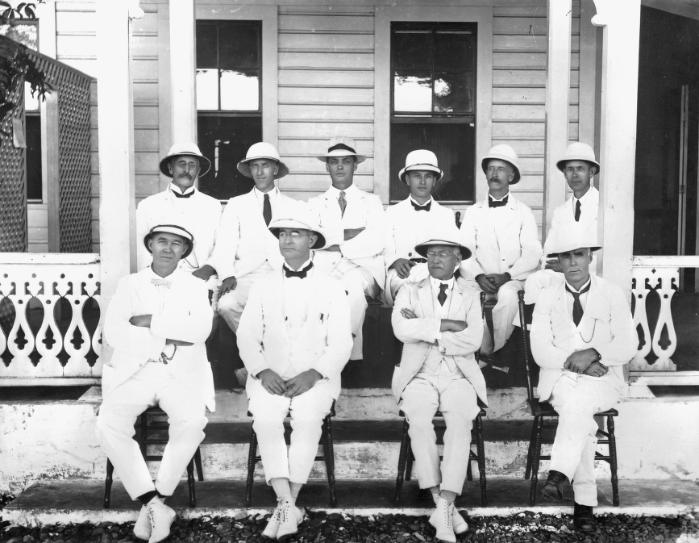
Members of the First Legislative Assembly of Samoa under New Zealand administration, circa 1921.

The Samoan Fono is descended from the Western Samoan Legislative Assembly established under New Zealand rule in the early 1900s. On the country's political independence in 1962, the 5th Legislative Assembly became the 1st Western Samoan Parliament.

== Powers and procedures ==
The Samoan Constitution provides the Legislative Assembly to make laws for the whole or any part of Samoa and laws having effect outside as well as within Samoa. Any Member of Parliament may introduce any bill or propose any motion for debate in the Assembly or present any petition to the Assembly, and the same shall be considered and disposed of under the provisions of the Standing Orders.

Members of Parliament possess parliamentary privilege and immunities.

The Legislative Assembly can be dissolved or prorogue by the O le Ao o le Malo, with the advice of the Prime Minister.

== Members of Parliament ==
Prior to a 2019 constitutional amendment, the Samoan Fono had 49 Members of Parliament. These were elected in six two-seat and 35 single-seat constituencies. Of these 49 seats, 47 were legally reserved for traditional heads of families (matai) and two for special constituencies: These two seats were first reserved for Samoan citizens descended from non-Samoans (so-called 'individual constituencies') and elected on a non-territorial basis until the 2015 constitutional amendment after which these were replaced with specific 'urban constituencies'. These 'urban constituencies' were only in place for the 2016 general election and were then abolished by the 2019 amendment ahead of the next general election. Following this amendment, each electoral constituency elects one member, totalling 51 members of parliament.

An extra Member of Parliament was added after the 2016 election in order to meet the quota of 10% female MPs.

Members of Parliament in Samoa are directly elected by universal suffrage, and serve a five-year term.

== Head of State ==
The ceremonial Head of State or O le Ao o le Malo is elected for a five-year term by the Fono. O le Ao o le Malo is limited to a maximum of 2 terms.

== Elections ==
Elections are held under a simple plurality system. Samoan electors are divided into 51 single member constituencies. Electors must be Samoan citizens and aged over 21. Candidates must be qualified as electors, and are required hold a matai title.

=== Last election results ===
Party	Votes	%	Seats	+/–
Faʻatuatua i le Atua Samoa ua Tasi	36,708	40.86	30	+5
Human Rights Protection Party	33,040	36.78	14	–11
Samoa Uniting Party	7,746	8.62	3	New
Samoa Labour Party	1,042	1.16	0	New
Tumua ma Pule Reform Republican Party	42	0.05	0	New
Constitution Democracy Republic Party	25	0.03	0	New
Independents	11,232	12.50	4	+3
Total	89,835	100.00	51	0
Valid votes	89,835	99.37		
Invalid/blank votes	568	0.63		
Total votes	90,403	100.00		
Registered voters/turnout	101,981	88.65		
Source: OEC, OEC, OEC, Samoa Observer (seats)

== Terms of parliament ==
The Legislative Assembly is currently in its 17th session, its convention did not occur until several months after the 2021 Samoan general election was held, due to the 2021 Samoan constitutional crisis. The 17th parliament convened for the first time on 14 September 2021.

Term	Elected in	Government
1st Legislative Assembly	1948 election	United Citizens Party
2nd Legislative Assembly	1951 election	No parties
3rd Legislative Assembly	1954 election	No parties
4th Legislative Assembly	1957 election	No parties
5th Legislative Assembly / 1st Parliament	1961 election	No parties
2nd Parliament	1964 election	No parties
3rd Parliament	1967 election	No parties
4th Parliament	1970 election	No parties
5th Parliament	1973 election	No parties
6th Parliament	1976 election	No parties
7th Parliament	1979 election	No parties
8th Parliament	1982 election	Human Rights Protection Party
9th Parliament	1985 election	Human Rights Protection Party / Christian Democratic Party
10th Parliament	1988 election	Human Rights Protection Party
11th Parliament	1991 election	Human Rights Protection Party
12th Parliament	1996 election	Human Rights Protection Party
13th Parliament	2001 election	Human Rights Protection Party
14th Parliament	2006 election	Human Rights Protection Party
15th Parliament	2011 election	Human Rights Protection Party
16th Parliament	2016 election	Human Rights Protection Party
17th Parliament	2021 election	Faʻatuatua i le Atua Samoa ua Tasi
18th Parliament	2025 election	Faʻatuatua i le Atua Samoa ua Tasi

== Building ==
The Fono is housed in a beehive-shaped building based on the traditional Samoan fale.

== See also ==
- Electoral Constituencies of Samoa
- List of speakers of the Legislative Assembly of Samoa
- Politics of Samoa
- List of legislatures by country
