= George Latu =

Samoan lawyer and rugby player

- Born: January 1, 1965 (age 61) Apia, Samoa
- Height: 5 ft 11 in (1.80 m)
- Weight: 201 lb (91 kg)
- University: University of Canterbury
- Notable relative: Victoria Latu
- Occupation(s): Barrister and Solicitor

Rugby union career
- Position: Tight head Prop
Amateur team(s)
Years	Team	Apps	(Points)
1992	Canterbury University		
1996	Invercargill		
Senior career
Years	Team	Apps	(Points)
1994-1995	Vaimoso	8	(5)
Provincial / State sides
Years	Team	Apps	(Points)
1992	Canterbury	4	(4)
1996	Southland	4	(0)
International career
Years	Team	Apps	(Points)
1993-1994	Tonga	8	(5)
1994-1995	Samoa	10	(0)

Matafeo George Latu (born January 1, 1965) is a Samoan lawyer and former dual international rugby union player who has played as a prop for both the Samoa national rugby union team and the Tonga national rugby union team. Since ending his rugby career he has worked as a lawyer in Samoa. He is the brother of lawyer and diplomat Leota Kosi Latu, and the husband of former Samoan Attorney-General Taulapapa Brenda Heather-Latu

== Early life ==
Latu was born to a Tongan father and Samoan mother. He was educated at New Plymouth Boys High School in New Zealand and later at the University of Canterbury, where he studied law. After graduating he returned to Samoa to take up a state solicitor role in the Samoa Attorney General's Office.

== Rugby career ==
Latu played for the university of Canterbury rugby team while at university. He played a few games at representative level for Canterbury, and played the 1996 NPC season for Southland in Invercargill. He later captained the Vaimoso Rugby Club.

From 1993 to 1994 he played six matches for the Tonga national rugby union team. In 1994 he was selected for the Samoa national rugby union team, playing his first match against Tonga on 4 June 1994. He was selected for the Manu Samoa squad for the 1995 Rugby World Cup, where he played three matches, replacing injured rugby legend Papali’itele Peter Fatialofa. His last international cap was during the Manu Samoa tour of the British Isles in 1997.

Since retiring as an international Latu has served as an honorary solicitor for the Samoa Rugby Union and as a Judicial Officer for the International Rugby Board. In 2015 he was elected secretary of the Samoa Rugby Union, and from 2016 to 2018 was its vice-chairman. In 2016 he was appointed as Samoa’s representative on the Oceania Rugby Executive Board and attended the World Rugby Congress in London in 2018.

== Legal career ==
Latu was a state solicitor in the murder trial of Leafa Vitale and Toi Aukuso Cain for the political assassination of Luagalau Levaula Kamu in 1999. He later served as a District Court judge.

He is currently the Managing Partner of Latu Lawyers, where he works with his wife Taulapapa Brenda Heather-Latu. He was a legal representative for the FAST party during the 2021 Samoan constitutional crisis, and assisted with the swearing-in of the Samoan Parliament on 24 May 2021. In July 2021 the HRPP regime attempted to have him prosecuted over his role in the ceremony, but the issue was resolved by the Samoan Court of Appeal's July 2021 ruling that the ceremony was legal and binding.

He is the holder of the following chiefly titles : Togia from Lefaga; Matafeo from Asaga, Punafelutu from Lano and Namulauulu from Fogapoa.
