= Lemalu Herman Retzlaff =

Samoan lawyer and jurist

Lemalu Hermann Retzlaff

Attorney General of Samoa
- In office 18 April 2016 – 20 March 2020
- Prime Minister: Tuila'epa Sa'ilele Malielegaoi
- Preceded by: Ming Leung Wai
- Succeeded by: Savalenoa Mareva Betham Annandale

Lemalu Hermann Retzlaff is a Samoan New Zealander lawyer. He served as Attorney-General of Samoa from 2016 to 2020. He is the son of former attorney-general and deputy prime minister Misa Telefoni Retzlaff.

== Early life and career ==
Retzlaff was born in Samoa and was educated at Apia Primary and Leifiifi Intermediate Schools. From 2001 he worked as a commercial law lecturer at the National University of Samoa before moving to New Zealand to work as a Crown Prosecutor. He was later a solicitor with the New Zealand Ministry of Justice's Public Defence Service. For two terms he was president of New Zealand's Pacific Law Association.

In the 2014 New Zealand general election he stood as a candidate for the New Zealand Labour Party in the newly-created electorate of Upper Harbour, losing to Paula Bennett.

== Attorney-General ==
In March 2016 he was appointed Attorney-General of Samoa. Shortly after taking the role Director of Public Prosecutions Mauga Precious Chang was charged with dangerous driving, and police chief Fuiavailili Egon Keil was suspended and charged with unlawful detention. Lemalu hired lawyers from New Zealand to oversee the prosecutions, a decision which was contested by the National prosecution Office. He was also responsible for the assault prosecution of Lands and Titles Court president Fepulea'i Attila Ropati and the subsequent appeal which led to his conviction. In July 2019 his contract as attorney-general was extended.

In February 2020 he resigned as attorney-general in order to take up a position as a crown solicitor in New Zealand. He was replaced as attorney-general by Savalenoa Mareva Betham Annandale. Following his resignation he spoke out in support of the controversial Land and Titles Bills, which were then before Samoa's parliament.

In 2022 Lemalu was appointed the Public Defender Waitakere within the New Zealand Ministry of Justice.
