= Nafanua (disambiguation) =

Nafanua was a historically important Samoan, also known as the "Warrior Princess".

Nafanua may also refer to:

- Western Samoan patrol vessel Nafanua, a Pacific Forum patrol vessel, operated by Western Samoa
- Samoan patrol vessel Nafanua II, a Guardian class replacement for the original Nafanua, commissioned in late 2019
- Nafanua, a nickname for the Samoa women's national cricket team
- Nafanua Volcano, an active underwater cone in the Vailulu'u volcano
