= Brenda Heather-Latu =

Samoan lawyer & jurist (born 1961)

Brenda Heather-Latu MBE

Attorney-General of Samoa
- In office 3 May 1997 – 4 December 2006
- Prime Minister: Tofilau Eti Alesana; Tuila'epa Sa'ilele Malielegaoi
- Succeeded by: Ming Leung Wai

Personal details
- Spouse: George Latu
- Education: Victoria University of Wellington

Taulapapa Brenda Heather-Latu MBE (born 23 December 1961) is a New Zealand-born Samoan lawyer and a former Attorney-General of Samoa. She was the first woman to serve as attorney general, and the first New Zealand-born Samoan to head a Government department in Apia. She is married to former dual international rugby player and lawyer George Latu.

Heather-Latu was born in Wellington, New Zealand. She attended Clyde Quay School in Mount Victoria, Wellington (1967–1974) and Wellington Girls' College in Thorndon (1975–1979) before completing degrees in arts and law at Victoria University of Wellington in 1985 and 1986. She was admitted to the bar as a barrister and solicitor in February 1987. She first worked in the Legal Division of the Dept of Education Head Office in Wellington as a law clerk (1985–1987). She subsequently worked in the Crown Law Office from 1988 until 1996 and where she was appointed a Crown Counsel from 1991 to 1996. In 1996 she resigned and moved to Apia, Samoa under the NZ Staffing Assistance aid programme to assist the Samoa Attorney General. She was subsequently appointed Attorney General of Samoa in May 1997. In June 1998 Prime Minister Tofilau Eti Alesana called on her to resign for allegedly leaking advice that three government contracts had not been properly tendered, including the lack of any bidding process for the construction of a $500,000 government prayer house. As attorney general she prosecuted the Luagalau Levaula Kamu assassination case, resulting in the conviction of the shooter and two former Ministers for murder. In 2004 she assisted the Public Service Commission in charging Ministry of Health Chief Executive Lolofie Taulealeausumai Enosa under the Public Service Act after he was suspended for fraud. When his contract ended before the charges had been fully investigated, she advised that the charges must be dropped given the allegations were unproven. She later advocated for changes to adoption law and for a specialist fraud unit and transnational crime unit. She resigned in August 2006 after criticism from the PM and Cabinet over her handling of an election petition against the then-Health Minister Mulitalo Siafausa Vui where her submissions that the Minister had clearly breached electoral provisions saw him lose his seat for bribery. After multiple failed attempts to find a replacement, she was eventually replaced by Ming Leung Wai.

Following her resignation she served as the inaugural chair of the newly established Samoa National Health Services Board from 2007 to 2009 and was a director and alternate chair of the board of Virgin Samoa from 2005 to 2012. She is currently a director of Habitat for Humanity (New Zealand) and the International Centre for Democratic Partnerships, and chair of the Pacific Leadership Foundation. She is also a serving Judicial Officer for World Rugby, the current chair of the Oceania Rugby Judicial Committee, and Honorary Consul for Great Britain and Northern Ireland to Samoa. She was bestowed the chiefly title of ‘Taulapapa’ from the village of Fogapoa in 2015.

In October 2019 Taulapapa was appointed by the Judicial Service Commission to investigate complaints made against three suspended Lands and Titles Court judges, resulting in two being dismissed and one being forced to retire.

She chaired the Samoa Law Society subcommittee which opposed the HRPP's controversial constitutional amendments, and in 2021 said that the law was a "direct and egregious attack on our Constitutional freedoms".

Heather-Latu represented the FAST Party with New Zealand barrister Ben Keith in court cases following the 2021 Samoan general election, and acted as the acting clerk of the Legislative Assembly when the clerk refused to undertake his functions for the party's makeshift swearing-in ceremony during the 2021 Samoan constitutional crisis. The ceremony and the swearing in were later upheld by the Court of Appeal in a case brought by the Attorney-General against Heather-Latu, her husband and FAST leaders and successfully defended by Keith and Apia lawyer Muriel Lui. Heather-Latu and Keith later successfully prosecuted the former Prime Minister for contempt of court.

Heather-Latu was appointed Member of the Order of the British Empire (MBE) in the 2024 New Year Honours for services to British Nationals in Samoa.

In August 2026 she was one of ten legal professionals awarded a lifetime achievement award by the Samoa Law Society.
