= Ming Leung Wai =

Samoan lawyer & jurist (born 1973)

Attorney General of Samoa
- In office 4 December 2006 – 4 March 2016
- Prime Minister: Tuila'epa Sa'ilele Malielegaoi
- Preceded by: Brenda Heather-Latu
- Succeeded by: Lemalu Herman Retzlaff

Personal details
- Born: 1973 (age 52–53)

Tuatagaloa Aumua Ming Leung Wai (born 1973) is a Samoan lawyer. He served as Attorney-General of Samoa from 2006 to 2016.

He was educated at Marist St Joseph’s school in Samoa and the University of Waikato in Hamilton, New Zealand, graduating with an LLB(Hons). He worked as a lawyer in New Zealand and Samoa before being appointed Attorney-General in November 2006.

As Attorney-General he represented the government in opposing a legal challenge against switching to driving on the left. In July 2009 he helped establish the Pacific Prosecutors Association. In 2009 he filed a complaint with the New Zealand Broadcasting Standards Authority over a 1News story about guns and drugs in Samoa. resulting in a finding that the story was inaccurate and unbalanced. In 2010 he filed a second complaint against a Campbell Live show which had alleged donations for the 2009 Samoa earthquake and tsunami were unaccounted for. The complaint was unsuccessful. In 2010 he threatened to charge the Samoa Observer with defamation over a story on the approval of casinos in Samoa.

In 2011 he defended Samoa's strict anti-party-hopping laws. In 2012 he investigated corruption in the police and at Tafaigata prison.

In March 2016 he was replaced by Lemalu Herman Retzlaff after he did not seek reappointment on the expiry of his contract.

In 2016 and 2017 he represented Director of Public Prosecutions Mauga Precious Chang when she was suspended over dangerous driving charges. In 2018 he represented President of the Land and Titles Court of Samoa Fepulea'i Attila Ropati who had been suspended over a charge of assault.

In August 2026 he was one of ten legal professionals awarded a lifetime achievement award by the Samoa Law Society.
