= Royal Samoan Police Band =

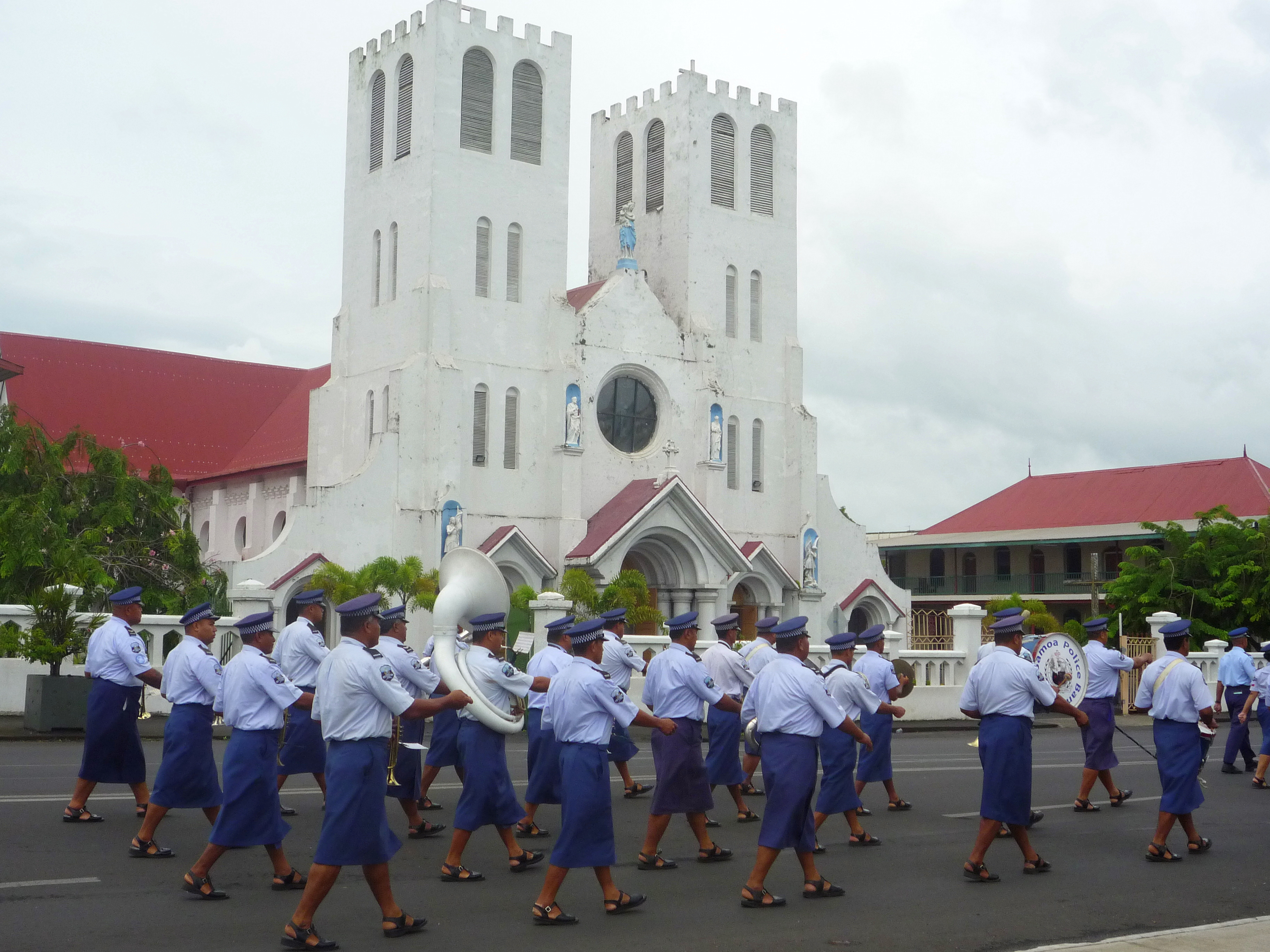
The band marching to Apia for the flag raising ceremony, 9 February 2009.

The Royal Samoa Police Band (RSPB) is the musical police band of the Samoa Police Service. Being that Samoa has no standing army (the New Zealand Defence Force is responsible for defense country), it is the chief unit of the state to support the government with music. As such, it plays at official police ceremonies, as well as ceremonies of state. It serves as a key component in some of the Ministry of Police's Community Engagement Programs. The band marches in traditional Samoan Lavalavas.

== Duties ==
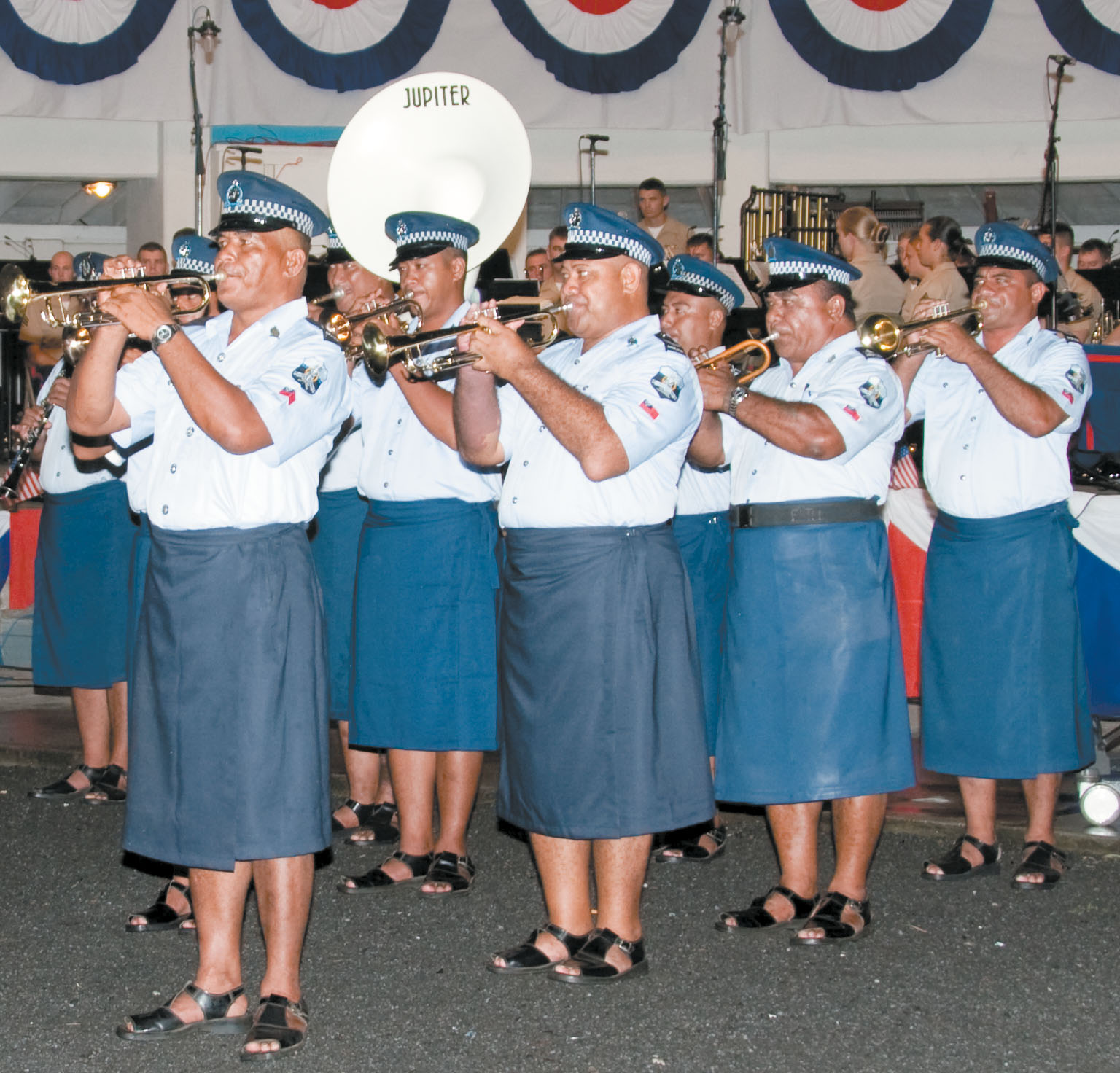
The Royal Samoan Police Band performed American Samoa's anthem before the United States Marine Forces Pacific Band, 2010.

The band marches to the Capitol Building in Apia on a daily basis to raise the national flag of Samoa in a ritual has existed since the 1970s. In April 2010, the band performed with the visiting United States Marine Forces Pacific Band during the 110th Flag Day celebrations that month. In the summer of 2015, the band visited Australia for the first time since their inception to celebrate the end of colonialism. It had only travelled as far as New Zealand and were given special permission by Prime Minister Tuilaepa Aiono Sailele Malielegaoi to perform a concert and at the Carriageworks centre in Sydney for three days. While at the latter, it performed Siamani Samoa by Michel Tuffery. The Legislative Council of New South Wales later honored the band's visit to New South Wales through a motion headed by Liberal Party member David Clarke to recognize the work of the band led by Superintendent Nafo'itoa Alesana Laki and Inspector Sala Opetaia Lauina.

In August 2019, the Australian Army Band Kapooka donated to the band 18,500 AUD worth of musical instruments.

== See also ==
- New Zealand Army Band
- Fiji Military Forces Band
- New Zealand Police Pipe Band
