= Samoan patrol vessel Nafanua III =

Patrol boat of the Samoan Police Service

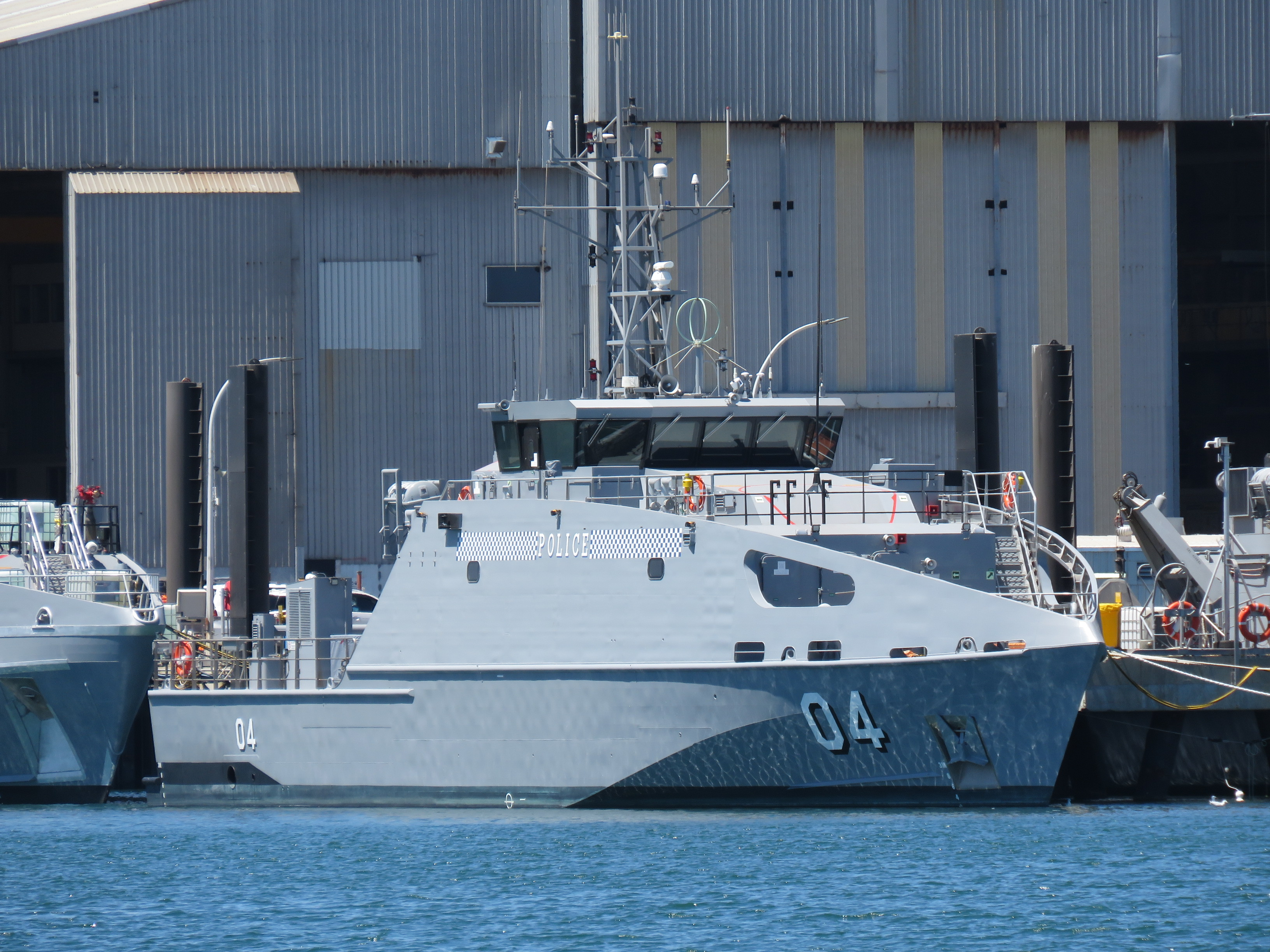
- Nafanua III at Austal shipyards in February 2023.

History

Samoa
- Name: Nafanua III
- Namesake: Nafanua
- Operator: Samoan Police Force
- Ordered: 2 November 2022
- Builder: Austal
- Cost: A$15.2 million
- Yard number: 542
- Acquired: 22 November 2023
- In service: 2024
- Home port: Apia
- Identification: Call sign: 5WDI; IMO number: 4734271; MMSI number: 561006007; Pennant number: 04
- Status: Delivered

General characteristics
- Type: Patrol boat
- Length: 39.5 m (129 ft 7 in)
- Beam: 8 m (26 ft 3 in)
- Draught: 2.5 m (8 ft 2 in)
- Propulsion: 2 × Caterpillar 3516C diesels, 2 shafts
- Speed: 20 knots (37 km/h; 23 mph)
- Range: 3,000 nmi (5,600 km; 3,500 mi) at 12 knots (22 km/h; 14 mph)
- Complement: 23
- Sensors & processing systems: X-band radar; Differential GPS; Gyrocompass; Depth sounding machine; Electronic Chart Display and Information System; Autopilot
- Armament: Australia provides the ships without armament, but they are designed to be able to mount heavy machine guns, or an autocannon of up to 30 mm on the foredeck

Nafanua III (04) is a Guardian-class patrol boat that was delivered to the Samoan Police Service on 22 November 2023. She was given to Samoa by Australia as part of the Pacific Maritime Security Program, in which Australia donates patrol boats to neighbouring Pacific Island nations to improve regional maritime security. She is the 2nd boat given to Samoa under the program, as she was ordered by Australia on 2 November 2022 as a replacement for her sister ship Nafanua II, which was damaged beyond repair when she ran aground on 5 August 2021. Nafanua II had only two years earlier replaced the 31-year-old Pacific-class patrol boat Nafanua as the small island nation's sole maritime security craft. Although she was ordered as the 22nd and ultimate boat of her class, she was delivered on 22 November 2023 as the 18th.

== Background ==
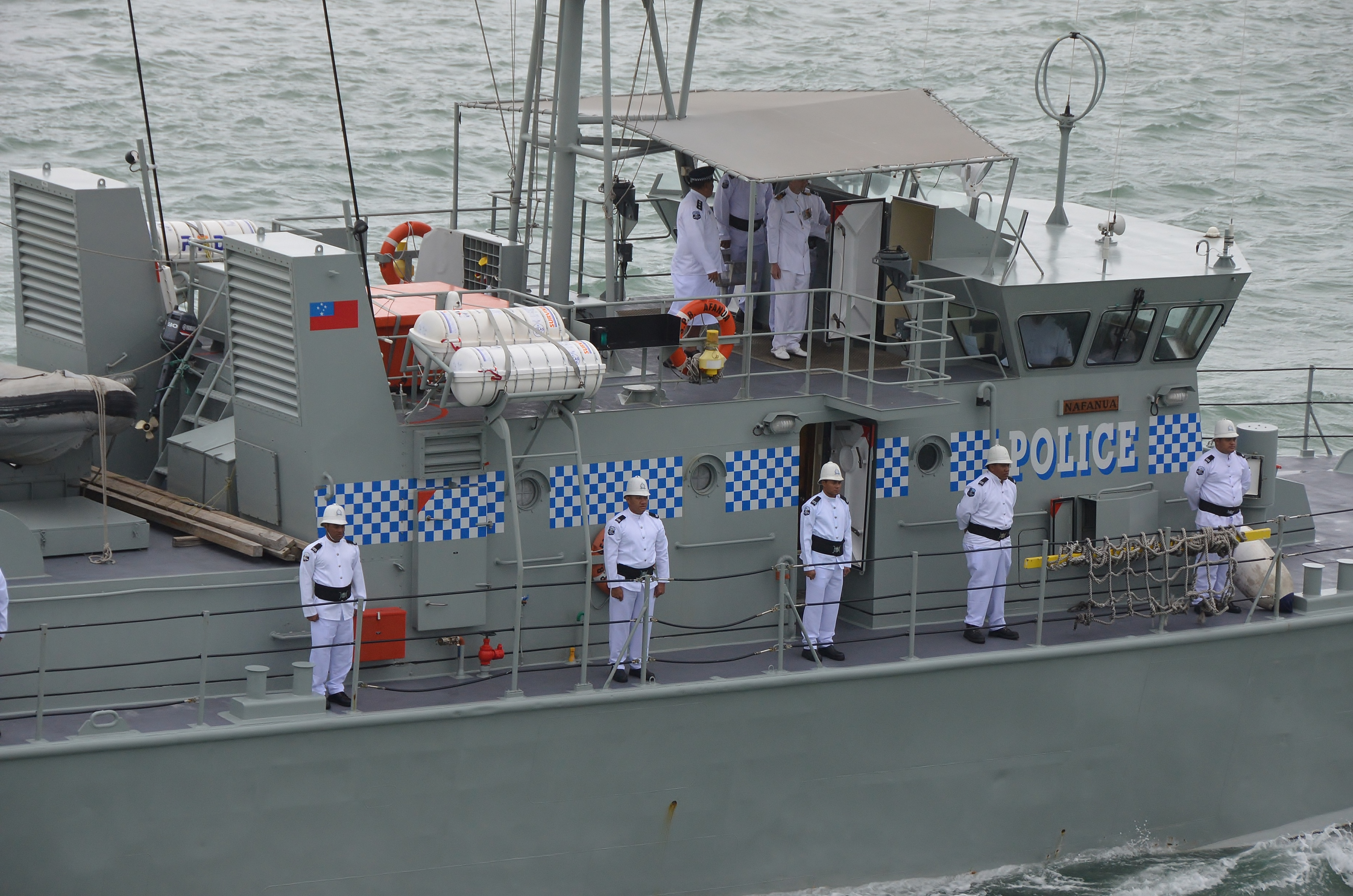
Pacific class Nafanua in 2016.

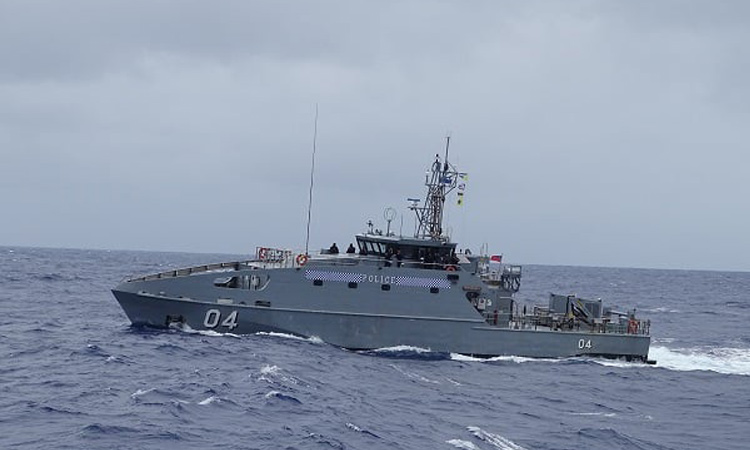
Sister ship Nafanua II at sea in November 2020.

Following the 1982 United Nations Convention on the Law of the Sea, the Pacific Islands nations found themselves in need of capable yet economical vessels to patrol their exclusive economic zones (EEZs), which had been extended under the convention to 200 kilometres (108 nmi). In an effort to improve regional maritime security as well as diplomatic relations with the island states, the Australian government launched the Pacific Patrol Boat Program in 1983, in which they would build and gift 22 Pacific-class patrol boats to 12 Pacific Island nations over the next 14 years. The patrol boats were built with commercial off-the-shelf-components in order to ease maintenance costs for the island nations. Australia remained involved with maintaining the class for the next three decades, with a refit after 15 years of operation.

Nafanua was launched in 1988 and delivered to Western Samoa. She departed Samoa on 13 June 2019 to be decommissioned in Australia.

The Australian government announced the Pacific Patrol Boat Replacement Project on 17 June 2014. A contract for the construction of at least 19 boats and an initial seven-year maintenance and support period was signed with Austal on 4 May 2016. The keel of the first vessel was laid on 30 July 2017, before she was launched on 30 May 2018.

Nafanua II was the fourth boat of the program, delivered on 16 August 2019, and commissioned on 16 October.

On 5 August 2021 Nafanua II ran aground on a reef near Salelologa wharf while transporting police officers to Savai'i to manage a protest. Australian specialists loaded her onto a barge and transported her to Cairns for assessment. She was found to be beyond economical repair, and given back to Australia for disposal. On 21 December 2021 the officer-in-charge of the boat at the time of the accident, Superintendent Taito Sefo Faaoi Hunt, was found guilty on three charges of negligence by a Police disciplinary tribunal. On 4 January he was fined $2000 Samoan tālā and demoted from superintendent to corporal.

During a visit to Apia in June 2022, Foreign Minister Penny Wong announced that Australia will build an additional vessel to replace Nafanua II. Austal announced that the order for the 22nd patrol boat had been placed on 2 November 2022.

== Design ==
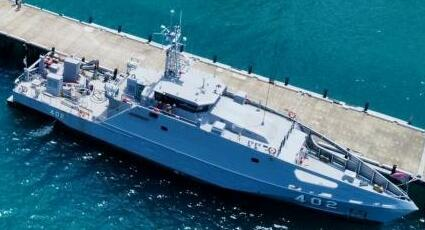
Aerial view of Rochus Lokinap

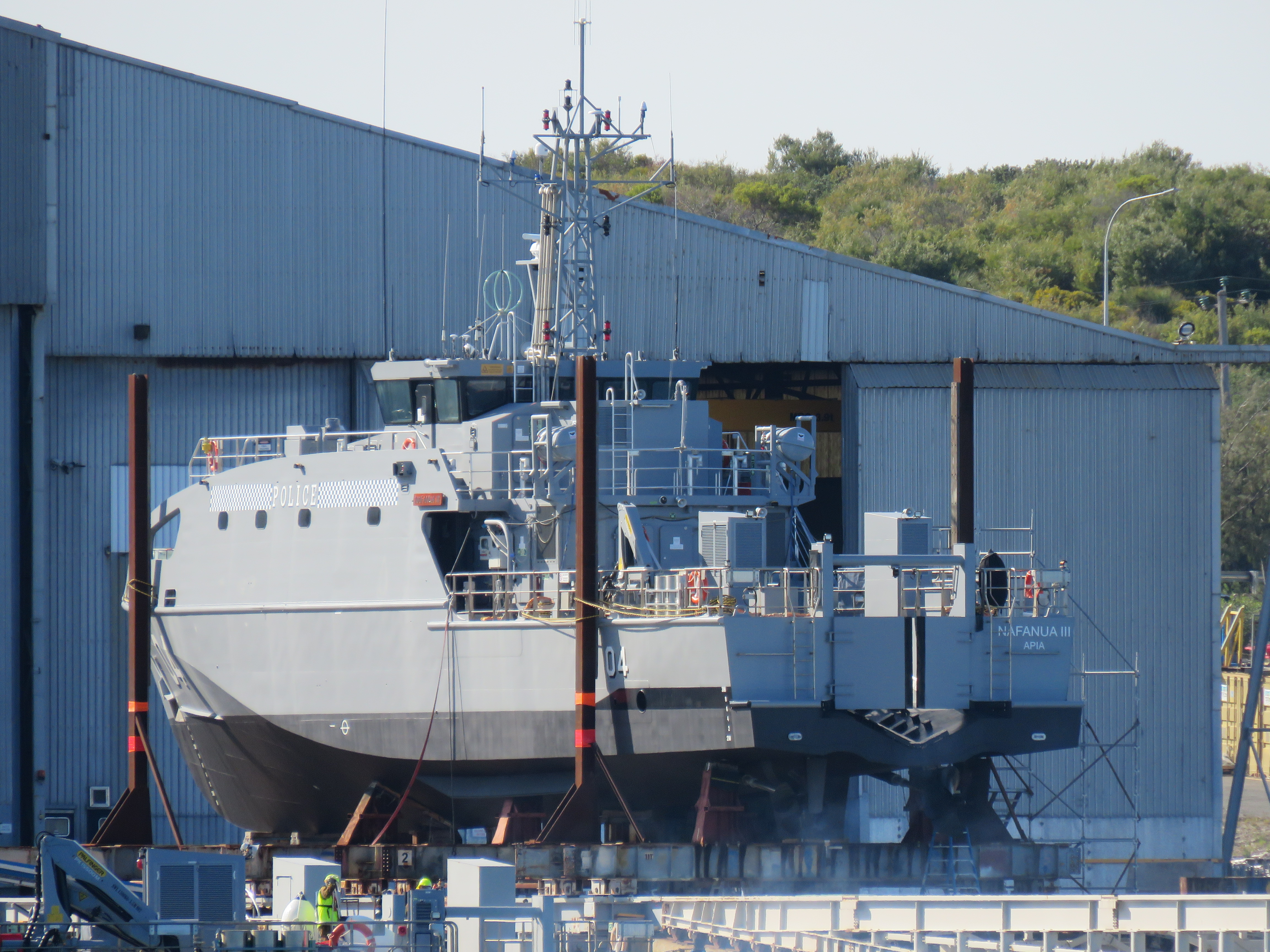
Dry docked Nafanua III, Sep. 2023

The Guardian class uses a steel monohull design based on that of the Bay class, which had been in service with the Australian Border Force since 1999. The patrol boats are 39.5 metres (129 ft 7 in) long with two habitable internal decks below the bridge. They are capable of traveling 3,000 nautical miles (5,600 km; 3,500 mi) at 12 knots (22 km/h; 14 mph), and have a maximum speed of 20 knots (37 km/h; 23 mph). They have two Caterpillar 3516C 2,000-kilowatt (2,700 hp) diesel engines powering two fixed-pitch propellers. A key design goal being ease of maintenance to accommodate small and isolated shipyards, the class uses commercial off-the-shelf components.

In addition to the commanding officer's quarters, the boats have seven living quarters designed to berth 20 crew members. Three of them are staterooms that have their own showers in order to accommodate a mixed-sex crew. They also have a sick bay with a separate ventilation system, which during normal operations is used as two berths, bringing the total complement up to 23.

The vessels have a stern launching ramp for a WRH635 fast rescue boat. These are SOLAS-certified rigid-hulled inflatable boats designed to carry up to 15 persons. They are 6.35 metres (20 ft 10 in) long, with two Yamaha 67 kW (90 hp) outboard motors and an operational weight of 2,612.5 kilograms (5,760 lb). The stern is also equipped with a port side crane serving a 16-square-metre (170 sq ft) cargo deck.

Australia instructed that the boats would be delivered without armament, but they were designed to be capable of mounting an autocannon of up to 30 millimetres (1.2 in) on their foredeck, and a 0.50-calibre machine gun both port and starboard in front of the bridge.

In June 2022, three design flaws were reported in the media. This included cracking in the coupling between the engine and the gear box, the sick bay ventilation system recirculating air and an exhaust leak causing carbon monoxide to enter the normally non-crewed engine compartment.

== Delivery ==
Nafanua III was delivered to Defence Australia by Austal and handed over to the Samoan Police Service at HMAS Stirling on 22 November 2023. Her new crew arrived in Henderson in September to prepare for the voyage to Samoa, where she is likely to arrive in January 2024.

== Operational history ==
In March 2026, the ship participated in the Royal Australian Navy's Exercise Kakadu Fleet Review on Sydney Harbour.
