= Attorney-General of Samoa =

Chief legal officer of the Independent State of Samoa

The attorney-general of Samoa is the chief legal officer of Samoa. It is a constitutional position, responsible for advising the government on legal matters and bringing criminal proceedings. The current Attorney-General is Mauga Precious Chang.

== Responsibilities and powers ==
The functions of the Attorney-General are specified in the Constitution of Samoa and the Attorney General's Office Act 2013. In addition to serving as chief executive of the Attorney General's Office, the attorney-general also has a statutory duty to attend and advise the O le Ao o le Malo, Cabinet of Samoa, prime minister, and other ministers, and to supervise legal services and officials in other ministries and government agencies. They also serve on the Judicial Services Commission, which makes recommendations on the appointment and dismissal of judges.

In performing their legal and constitutional functions, the attorney-general is statutorily independent.

== History ==
Under the New Zealand colonial administration, the New Zealand Attorney-General had full control of Samoa's legal system. As Samoa moved towards self-government in the 1950's, the New Zealand government established an executive council with a mix of official and elected members; one of the official members was an Attorney-General. In 1956 the position was formally established in law as part of the Western Samoan public service.

On independence the position was established in clause 41 of the Constitution of Samoa. They are appointed by the O le Ao o le Malo acting on the advice of the prime minister of Samoa and must be qualified to be a judge of the Supreme Court of Samoa.

The office was politicised during the 2021 Samoan constitutional crisis, with incumbent Savalenoa Mareva Betham Annandale refusing to participate in court hearings and accusing the courts of bias and conflicts of interest. Following the resolution of the crisis Savalenoa refused to meet with the new government and refused to defend the judiciary from attacks by the HRPP because of the "sensitive political climate". She was sacked and replaced by Law Society of Samoa president Suʻa Hellene Wallwork.

== List of attorneys-general of Samoa ==
- Paul Molineaux (1961 - 1962)
- R S Frapwell (1962 - ?)
- Ian Hay (1972 - 1973)
- Anthony George Thurlow Wane (1973)
- David Hull (1974)
- Tuiloma Neroni Slade (1976 - 1982)
- André Garneau (1983 - 1985)
- Misa Telefoni Retzlaff (1986 - 1988)
- Patu Tiava'asu'e Falefatu Sapolu (1988 - 1991)
- Tupa'i Seapa (1992 - 1996)
- Brenda Heather-Latu (1997 - 2006)
- Ming Leung Wai (2006 - 2016)
- Lemalu Herman Retzlaff (2016 - 2020)
- Savalenoa Mareva Betham Annandale (2020 - 2021)
- Suʻa Hellene Wallwork (2021 - 2026)
- Mauga Precious Chang (2026 - present)
