= Tuala Tagaloa Sale Kerslake =

Samoan politician

President of the Land and Titles Court of Samoa
- In office 1 February 2005 – 22 April 2016
- Nominated by: Tuila'epa Sa'ilele Malielegaoi
- Succeeded by: Fepulea'i Attila Ropati

Minister of Lands and Environment
- In office 1996 – 31 January 2005
- Prime Minister: Tuila'epa Sa'ilele Malielegaoi; Tofilau Eti Alesana
- Succeeded by: Faumuina Tiatia Liuga

Minister of Commerce, Industry and Labour
- In office 1996 – 20 March 2001
- Succeeded by: Hans Joachim Keil III

Minister of Trade and Tourism
- In office 1996 – 20 March 2001
- Succeeded by: Hans Joachim Keil III

Member of the Samoa Parliament for Anoamaa West
- In office 26 April 1996 – 31 January 2005
- Preceded by: Leota Leuluaiali'i Ituau Ale
- Succeeded by: Fonotoe Pierre Lauofo

Personal details
- Party: Human Rights Protection Party

Tuala Tagaloa Sale Kerslake (born 1954) is a Samoan judge, politician and former Cabinet Minister. From 2004 — 2016 he was President of the Land and Titles Court of Samoa. He is a member of the Human Rights Protection Party.

== Early life ==
Kerslake is from the village of Saoluafata. He worked as a lawyer in New Zealand and Samoa, and then as a civil servant, serving as Secretary for Justice from 1989 — 1996.

== Cabinet minister ==
He was first elected to the Legislative Assembly of Samoa at the 1996 election and was appointed Minister of Tourism and the Environment. He was re-elected in 2001 and retained his Environment portfolio while surrendering Trade and Tourism and Commerce, Industry and Labour to Hans Joachim Keil III. As Environment Minister he led the Alliance of Small Island States at the signing of the Kyoto Protocol. He also opposed the creation of a South Pacific Whale Sanctuary.

In 1998 as the health of Prime Minister Tofilau Eti Alesana deteriorated he was one of the candidates to succeed him. In 2003 he was Samoa's candidate for Secretary-General of the Pacific Islands Forum, but lost to Greg Urwin.

== Lands and Titles Court ==
In 2005 he resigned as an MP in order to become President of the Land and Titles Court of Samoa, triggering the 2005 Anoama'a West By-election. His judicial appointment was controversial, with opposition leader Le Mamea Ropati questioning Kerslake's qualifications and claiming that it threatened to politicise the judiciary. The government defended the appointment, saying that it had been recommended by the Judicial Services Commission.

While President of the Court, he oversaw the case of the disputed succession to the Malietoa title.

He resigned as President of the Land and Titles Court "for family reasons" in April 2016.
