= Savalenoa Mareva Betham Annandale =

Samoan lawyer and jurist

Attorney-General of Samoa
- In office 22 July 2020 – 2 September 2021 (Note: Suspended: 20 August 2021 – 2 September 2021)
- Prime Minister: Tuilaʻepa Saʻilele Malielegaoi; Fiamē Naomi Mataʻafa
- Preceded by: Lemalu Herman Retzlaff
- Succeeded by: Suʻa Hellene Wallwork

Personal details
- Party: Human Rights Protection Party

Savalenoa Mareva Betham Annandale is a Samoan lawyer and jurist. From July 2020 to September 2021, she served as Attorney-General of Samoa. Previously she had served as the first female president of the Samoa Law Society.

Annandale was educated at the University of Central Queensland, graduating with a B.A. in history in 1991. She then studied law at the University of the South Pacific, graduating with a law degree in 1997. She worked as a public servant in New Zealand for the Department of Corrections, Ministry of Pacific Island Affairs, and Ministry of Foreign Affairs and Trade before returning to Samoa to work for the Office of the Attorney General and the Ministry of Justice and Courts Administration. She then entered private practice with her husband Lauaki Jason Annandale and served as President of the Samoa Law Society until 2017. In 2016, she called for judges of the Land and Titles Court of Samoa to receive legal training. During the COVID-19 pandemic, she was appointed by Samoa's cabinet to sit on an advisory committee on the state of emergency.

In July 2020 she was appointed Attorney-General for a term of three years, replacing Lemalu Herman Retzlaff.

Savalenoa played a key role in the 2021 Samoan constitutional crisis, representing the caretaker regime of Tuila'epa Sa'ilele Malielegaoi in court cases over the women's quota, the head of state's attempt to call new elections, and other issues of constitutional interpretation. She refused to participate in a key hearing on 23 May to overturn the head of state's purported suspension of parliament, then attempted to disqualify Chief Justice Satiu Simativa Perese and all other members of the Supreme Court of Samoa from hearing election-related cases, alleging bias and "conflicts of interest". She subsequently rescinded the request and apologized to the judiciary. Following the FAST Party's 24 May swearing-in ceremony she took court action to have it declared unlawful. As a result, parliament was ordered to convene within seven days, and she was ordered to advise the Clerk of the Legislative Assembly and all other relevant constitutional actors to do so. Her appeal against this order, and related action by FAST seeking to validate the swearing-in under the doctrine of necessity, ultimately resulted in the crisis being resolved and FAST being declared the government.

Following the resolution of the crisis, Savalenoa refused to meet with the new government, saying that she was too busy drafting her letter of resignation. She subsequently told Prime Minister Fiamē Naomi Mataʻafa that she would not defend the judiciary from attacks by the HRPP because of the "sensitive political climate". On 20 August 2021, she was suspended by Cabinet.

On 2 September 2021, Savalenoa was dismissed from office due to her disrespect for the Supreme Court of Samoa and her failure to defend the judiciary. She was replaced by Law Society of Samoa president Suʻa Hellene Wallwork. The following year, she filed a lawsuit against prime minister Fiamē surrounding her ousting by the head of government.

== Notes ==
Legal offices
Preceded by Lemalu Herman Retzlaff	Attorney-General of Samoa; 2020–2021	Succeeded by Suʻa Hellene Wallwork
