= Military of Samoa =

Samoa has no formal defence structure or regular armed forces. It has informal defence ties with New Zealand, which is required to consider any request for assistance from Samoa under the bilateral Treaty of Friendship of 1962.

== History ==
In 2022, there were about 900–1,100 police officers in Samoa, in three years time Samoa would soon have a force of 1,000 active police officers serving the country as well as 3 new patrol vessels.

Officers of the national police force, the Samoa Police Service, are regularly unarmed, but may be armed in exceptional circumstances with ministerial approval. State armories were estimated to hold about 142 small arms; they also have three 3-pounder cannons in 2003. By 2022, armories estimated to hold about 650–700 rifles, pistols and shotguns including military grade equipment as well as six 3-pounder artillery cannons and two 30 mm autocannons; soon a third 30 mm autocannon will be ordered for a new patrol boat by 2023. Samoan police naval forces have also announced that there will be three new patrol boats which will soon be built which will be able to hold one 30 mm autocannon and two heavy machine guns each. In 2019, Samoa was given an unarmed patrol boat, the Nafanua II by Australia. In June 2022, Australia's Foreign Minister Penny Wong announced with Samoan Prime Minister Fiamē Naomi Mataʻafa that the craft would be replaced at Australia's expense after Nafanua II ran aground on a reef in August 2021.

== See also ==
- List of countries without armed forces
