= Lesatele Rapi Vaai =

President of the Land and Titles Court of Samoa
- Incumbent
- Assumed office 2 November 2022
- Preceded by: Fepulea'i Attila Ropati

Lesatele Rapi Vaai is a Samoan judge and President of the Land and Titles Court of Samoa. He served on the Supreme Court of Samoa until 2017, and again from 2020.

Vaai is a former president of the Samoa law Society. In the mid-1970's he joined the law firm of his cousin, politician Asiata Saleʻimoa Vaʻai, to form Vaai & Vaai. He was appointed to the District Court of Samoa in 1996. He later served as President of the Land and Titles Court of Samoa. He was later appointed to the Supreme Court of Samoa.

He retired from the Court in February 2017 to take up a judicial position in Nauru. Following his retirement he was appointed to chair a Commission of Inquiry into the actions of three police officers accused of misconduct and evidence tampering. In November 2020 he was reappointed to the Supreme Court as a temporary judge for a term of one year to help deal with election-related cases.

Justice Vaai has also presided over an application on April 14, 2022, by Talalei Pauga to set aside a warrant of arrest issued by former Supreme Court of Samoa Deputy Registrar Fataasi, for conspiracy to murder the former Prime Minister of Samoa which affidavit material sworn by Fataasi evidenced to be on the instructions of Justice Clark. Justice Vaai's decision is yet to be published more than one year later.

On 29 October 2022 the Samoan cabinet told Land and Titles Court of Samoa President Fepulea'i Attila Ropati to vacate office by 1 November. On 30 October the Samoa Observer reported that Vaai would be sworn in to replace him. He was sworn in as President of the court on 2 November 2022. In 2023 his term was extended for another 12 months.
