= 1923 New Year Honours (New Zealand) =

Appointments by King George V

The 1923 New Year Honours in New Zealand were appointments by King George V on the advice of the New Zealand government to various orders and honours to reward and highlight good works by New Zealanders. The awards celebrated the passing of 1922 and the beginning of 1923, and were announced on 1 January 1923.

The recipients of honours are displayed here as they were styled before their new honour.

== Knight Bachelor ==
- Harold Beauchamp – of Wellington; lately chairman of the board of directors of the Bank of New Zealand, and a leading financial authority.
- George Elliot OBE – of Auckland; chairman of the board of directors of the Bank of New Zealand. Has frequently acted as arbitrator in industrial disputes.
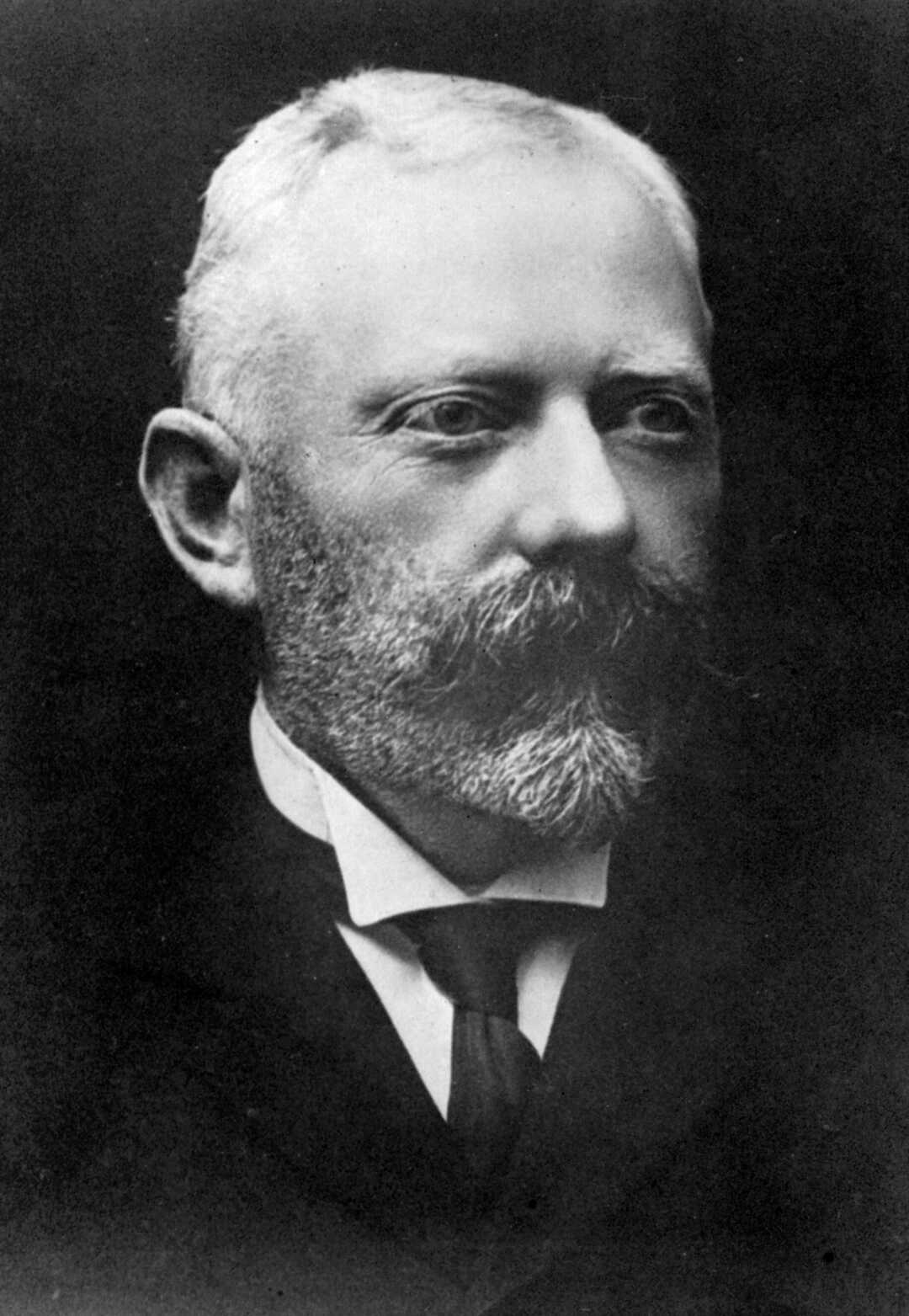
Sir Harold Beauchamp

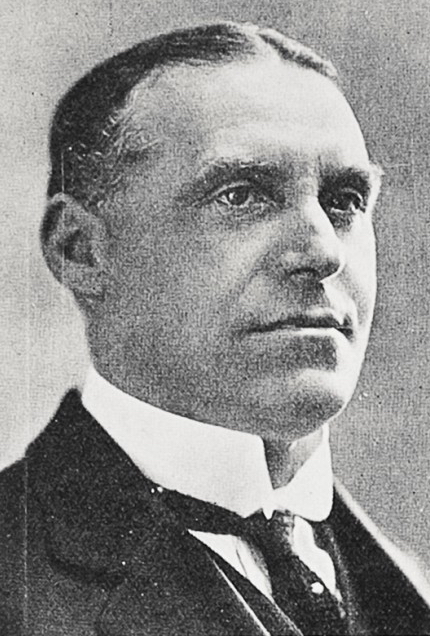
Sir George Elliot

== Order of Saint Michael and Saint George ==
=== Knight Grand Cross (GCMG) ===
- The Honourable Sir Francis Henry Dillon Bell KCMG KC – attorney-general and leader of the Legislative Council.
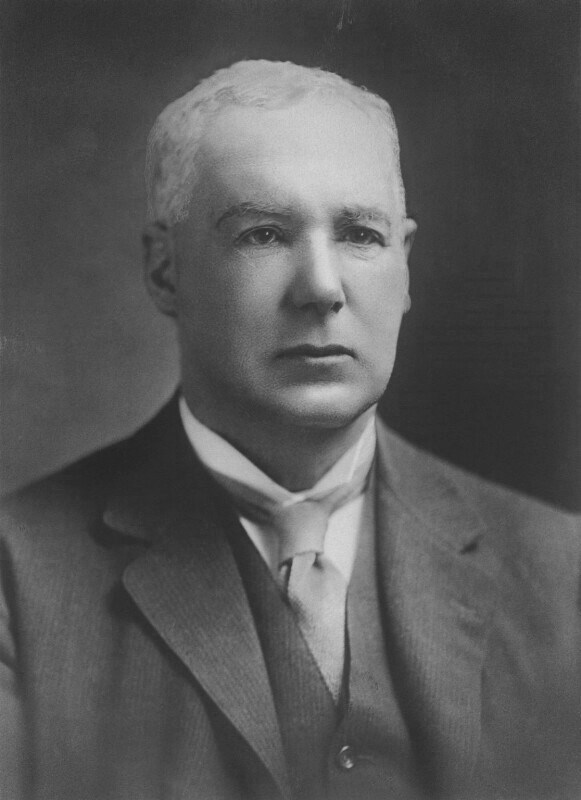
Sir Francis Bell

=== Companion (CMG) ===
- Edward Newman – of Marton; for many years member of the House of Representatives, and author of the movement resulting in the "New Zealand Sheepowners' Acknowledgment of Debt to British Seamen Fund".
- Colonel Robert Ward Tate CBE – lately administrator of Western Samoa.
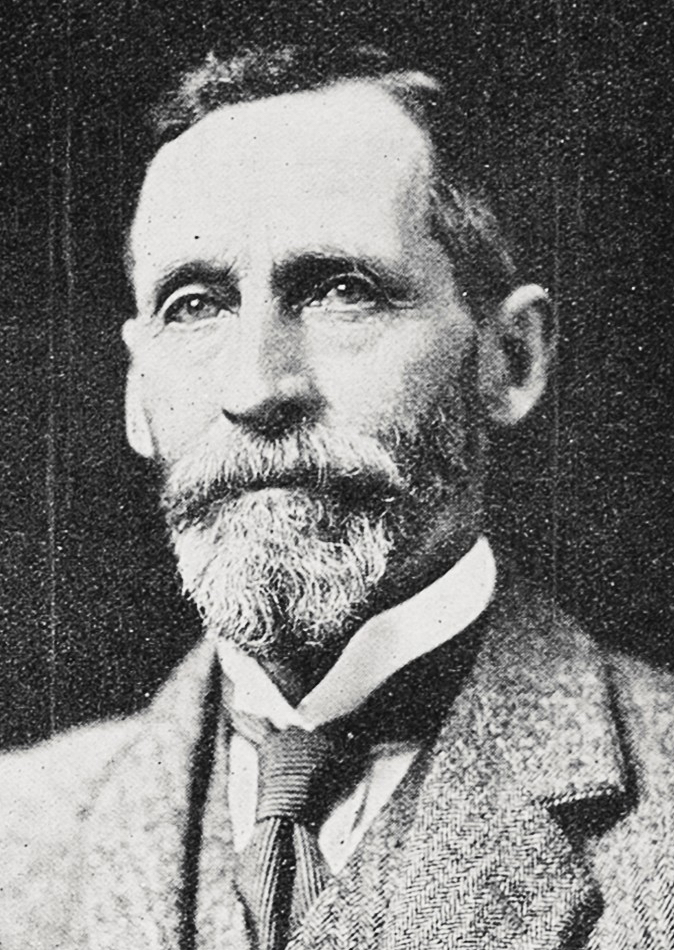
Edward Newman

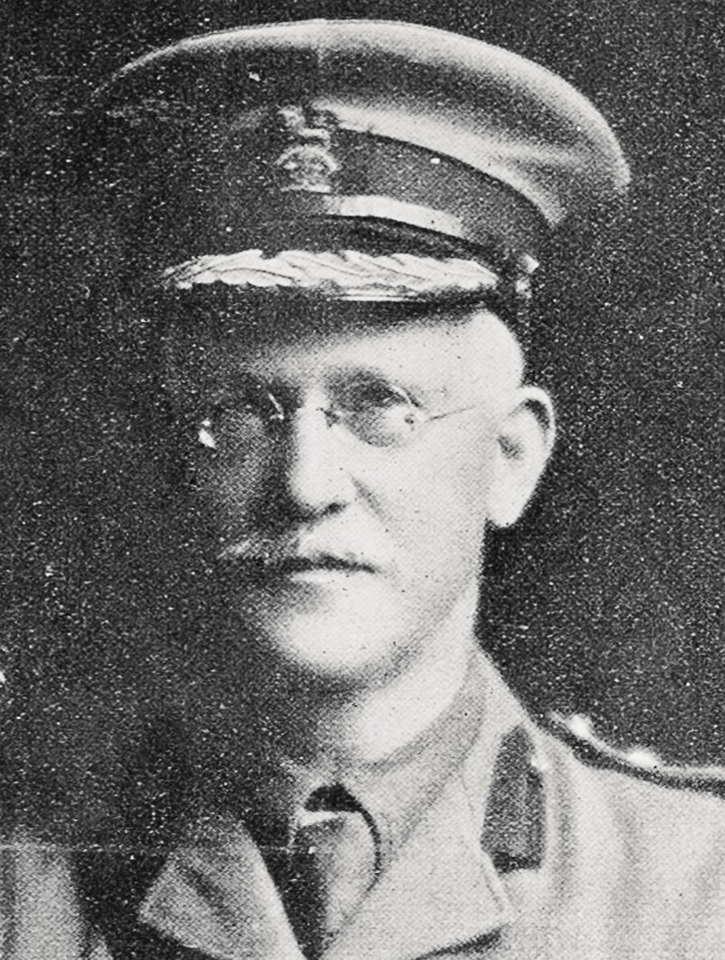
Robert Ward Tate

== Order of the British Empire ==
=== Commander (CBE) ===
Civil division

- William Barr Montgomery OBE – of Wellington; permanent head of the Customs Department.
- Henry Percy Pickerill OBE MD – of Dunedin. In recognition of valuable services since the war in connection with facial and jaw operations on wounded soldiers.
- Bernard Edward Howard Tripp MBE – of Timaru; representative of New Zealand at the Red Cross conference at Geneva, 1921.
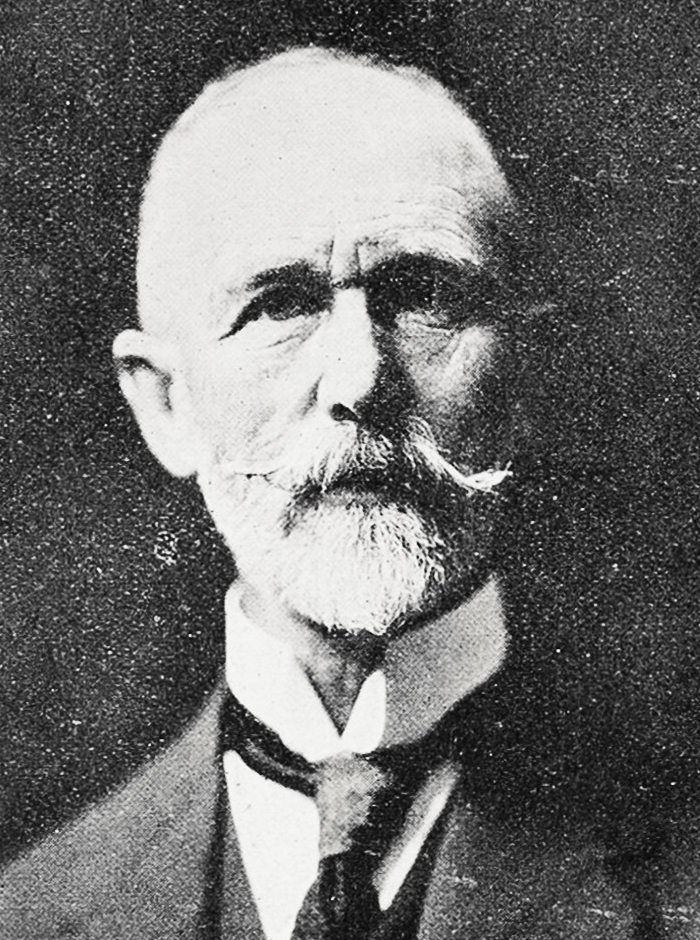
William Barr Montgomery

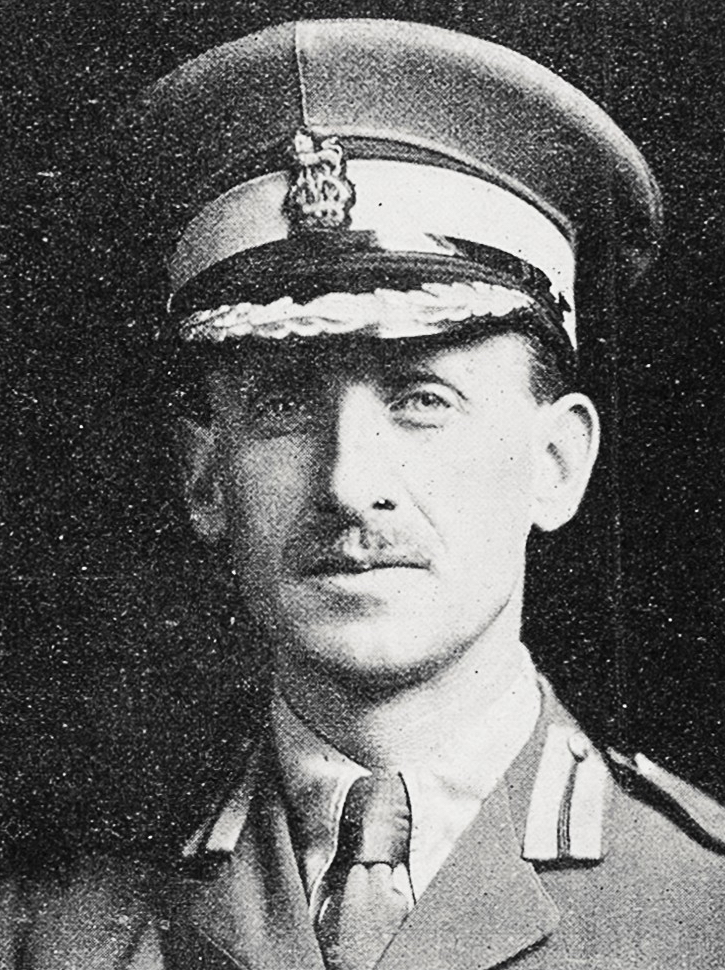
Henry Pickerill

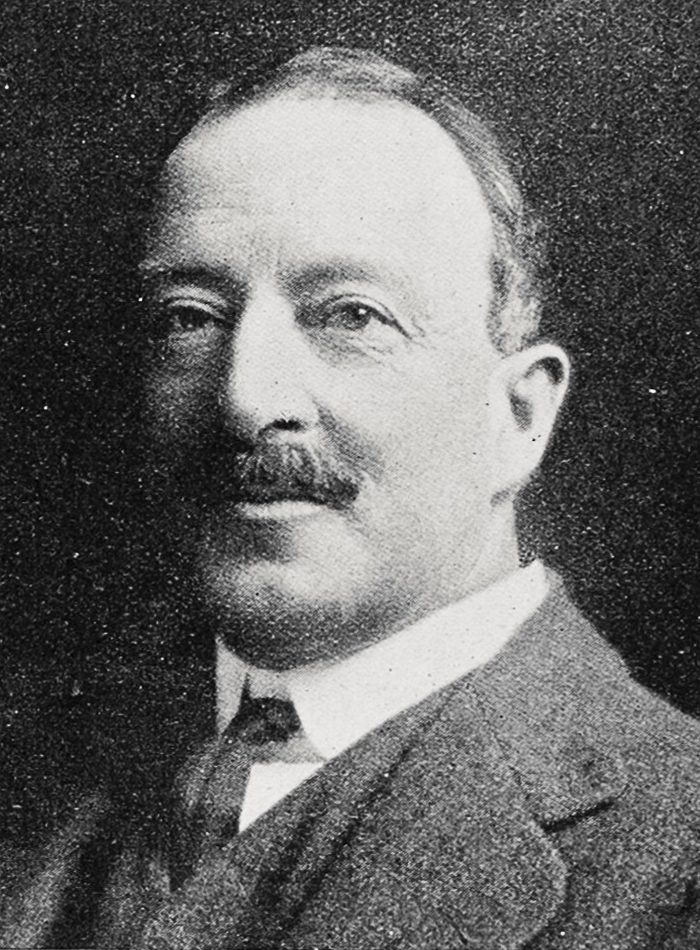
Bernard Tripp

=== Officer (OBE) ===
Civil division

- William Henry Leader Foster MA – of Wellington; headmaster of the Clyde Quay Primary School.

== King's Police Medal (KPM) ==
- Francis John O'Donoghue – of Wanganui; constable, New Zealand Police.
- Roger John Wilson – of Wanganui; constable, New Zealand Police.
