= Eletise Leafa Vitale =

Samoan convict (born 1965/66)

Eletise Leafa Vitale (born 1965 or 1966) is a Samoan convict who was involved in an assassination attempt against then-Prime Minister of Samoa Tuilaʻepa Saʻilele Malielegaoi and Minister of Works Luagalau Levaula Kamu in 1999. The assassination attempt was conspired by his father, former Women's Affairs Minister Leafa Vitale, and former Communications Minister Toi Aukuso.

On the night of 16 July 1999, during celebrations of the 20th anniversary of the ruling Human Rights Protection Party, Vitale fatally shot Kamu in the back. He pleaded guilty to murder and was sentenced to death by hanging on 6 August 1999 by Justice Andrew Wilson. His death sentence was commuted to life imprisonment by Malietoa Tanumafili II, the head of state of Samoa.

Vitale was granted parole in 2010, but rearrested for breach of parole in 2019.
