= Clyde Quay School =

State school in Wellington, New Zealand

- Te Kura O Clyde Quay / Te Kura O Matairangi
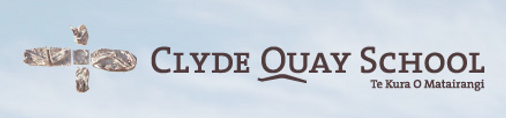

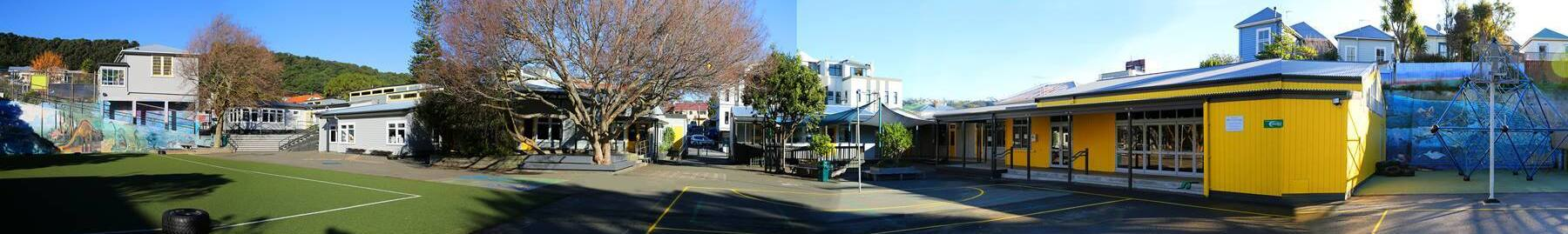
- School logo, used since July 2011 (top)

Location
- 27 Elizabeth Street; Mount Victoria; Wellington, Wellington Region; New Zealand; 41°17′45″S 174°47′05″E

Information
- School type: State school Full primary school
- Founded: c. 1887
- Founder: Mr. W. T. Grundy
- School board: Michelle Little (Chairperson); Sarah Todd; Sue Bibby; Rona Lemalu; Chris Myatt; Andrew Neal; Neil Passey
- Ministry of Education Institution no.: 2827
- Principal: Cameron Ross
- Staff: 20 as of April 2024
- Teaching staff: 13 as of April 2024
- Years taught: Preschool to Year 8
- Age range: 5–13
- Average class size: 40
- Language: English and Māori
- Athletics: Yes
- Sports: Soccer, Basketball, Table tennis, Netball, Swimming, Softball, Tee-ball, Touch
- Socio-economic decile: 10
- Website: https://clydequay.school.nz
- Last updated: July 2025

Clyde Quay School is a comprehensive state school in the suburb of Mount Victoria, Wellington, New Zealand. It serves students ranging in age from five to thirteen. Approximately 240 children are enrolled as of April 2024. The school shares its site with Pikopiko, a kindergarten which accommodates children aged 3 to 4.

== History ==
=== 1800s – 1900s ===
The history of the school dates back to 1887, when the city was still in its early phases of development. The school was designed by architect Thomas Turnbull in 1887, and in 1888 builders Thomson and Mclean constructed the first building on 38/2 Oriental Parade, Oriental Bay, at a cost of £ 2111, equivalent to $NZ 300,000 as of December 2023. Both main buildings were completed in March 1890.

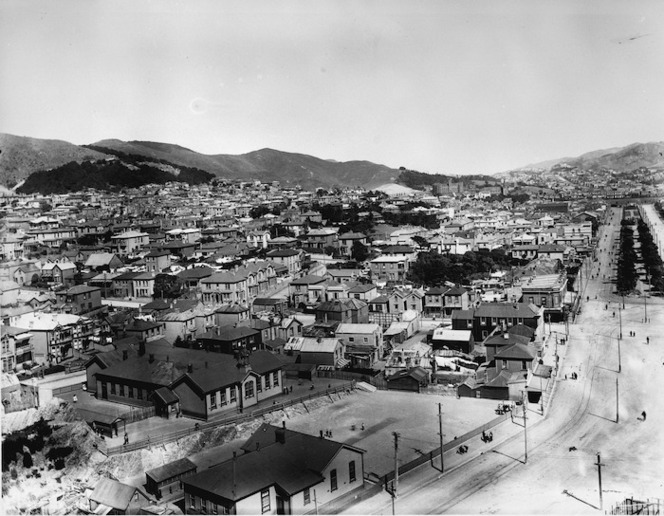
Clyde Quay School from a bird's-eye view, c. 1908–1910

=== 1920s ===
In 1923, a new school was built at Elizabeth Street in Mount Victoria, and the infant department moved there.

Headmaster William Foster was honoured with an OBE in the 1923 New Years Honours.

=== 1930s ===
On 21 December 1935, the school made the decision to permanently close the original site on Oriental Parade because the site was required for the fire brigade to build a station. To farewell the original school, a jubilee and a final assembly of all former students took place at the school. The school's operations continued at the Elizabeth Street site without a change of name, and the former school site now houses Wellington City Fire Station.

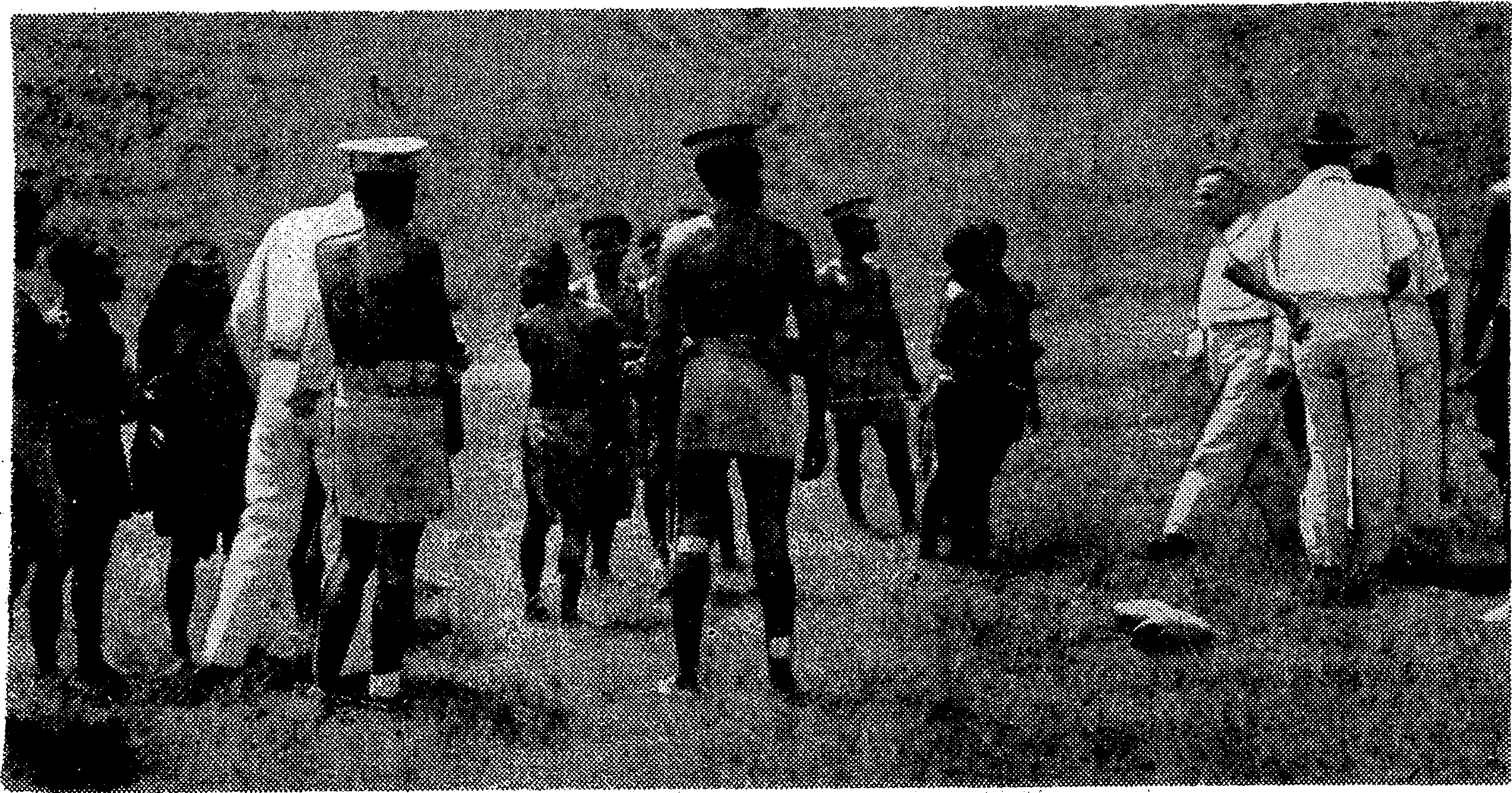
Clyde Quay School Jubilee, December 1935

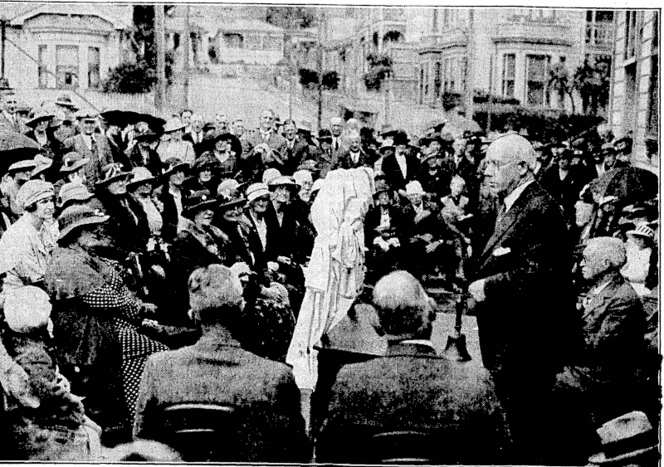
Clyde Quay School's last gathering before, December 1935

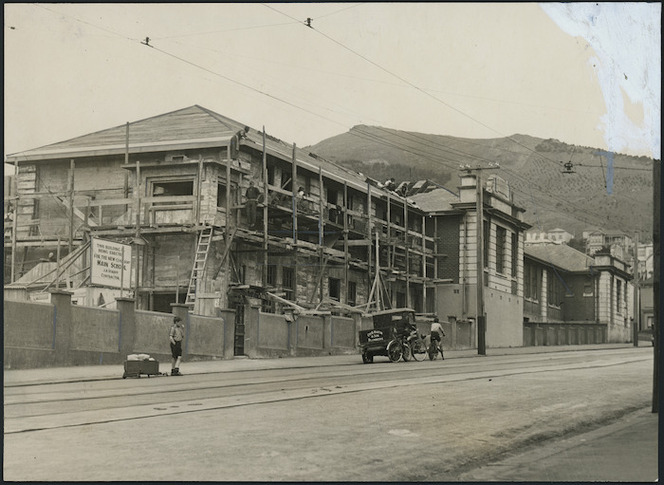
Clyde Quay School in construction, December 1935

=== 1980s ===
The Cure, an English rock band, is well known in the school's community for playing their songs in the basement of Clyde Quay School.

"The jam was very noisy, but a lot of fun. The Neoterics played a few of their songs with The Cure's Lol Tolhurst on drums, then The Cure themselves did a few of theirs and sounded like a real garage band. We then did one of my band's songs with Robert on bass and Lol on drums, finally packing it in around 3 am." a member of another band said.

=== 1990s ===
New Zealand artist Robert Stewart painted numerous murals throughout the school which are still in place today.

Experts Masaaki Mitani and Masahiro Yamada from Japan performed a Kendo display at the school.

=== 2010s ===
In 2012, students from Clyde Quay School were interviewed in the school library by the New Zealand comedy group Flight of the Conchords for lyrical ideas for their song Feel Inside (And Stuff Like That).

=== 2020s ===
Ben Buchanan, a New Zealand artist, painted new school murals, which represent Clyde Quay School and its students. These murals are displayed on the school's outer wall, replacing the previous ones.

== School premises ==
The school premises include a library, a sports field, a hall, and recreational spaces.

=== Notable schoolground renovations ===
In 2021, the class of Karaka underwent reconstruction, beginning a series of future renovations to the school.

In late 2023, the class of Pohutukawa had a renovation, which included extending the courtyard, creating playspaces, a vegetable garden and kitchens for playing.

In 2024, renovations on the class of Rimu began, and ended a few months after.

In the latter quarter of 2024, the relocation of the school hall commenced. It is scheduled to be complete in Term 2 of 2025.

The demolition of the Neptune climbing frame, the leveling of the ground beneath it, and the development of a sports field in its place are scheduled for completion by Term 2 of 2025.

== Headmasters/Principals ==
| Name | Years served |
|---|---|
| W. T. Grundy | 1889–1917 |
| W. H. L. Foster | 1917–1924 |
| T. Irvine | 1925–1929 |
| M. J. O'Connor | 1929–1934 |
| J. J. Rodgers | 1934–1940 |
| F. Hayes | 1943–? |
| Liz Patara | 1999–2024 |
| Cameron Ross | 2024–present |

== Notable former students ==
- Richard Campion (1923–2013), theatre director
- Brenda Heather-Latu (born 1961), Attorney-General of Samoa
- Rex Mason (1885–1975), politician
- Marjory Nicholls (1890–1930), poet and playwright
