= Leota Kosi Latu =

Samoan lawyer and diplomat

Director-General of the Pacific Regional Environment Programme
- In office January 2016 – 3 April 2022
- Deputy: Easter Chu Sing
- Preceded by: David Sheppard
- Succeeded by: Sefanaia Nawadra

Leota Namulauulu Lalomanu Kosi Latu is a Samoan lawyer and diplomat who served as Director-General of the Pacific Regional Environment Programme from 2016 to 2022. He is the brother of rugby player and lawyer George Latu.

Latu was educated at the University of Canterbury in New Zealand. He worked as a prosecutor for the Samoan Attorney General's Office before moving to London to work as a lawyer for the Commonwealth Secretariat. From 2006 to 2008 he worked for the United Nations Office for Project Services alongside the Pacific Islands Forum secretariat in Suva, Fiji.

In 2008 he was appointed Deputy Director-General of the Pacific Regional Environment Programme. In September 2015 he was selected as its Director-General. From the beginning of his term as Director he was a strong voice on climate change, urging Pacific nations to speak up and demanding rich nations show greater ambition in reducing emissions. At the 2018 United Nations Climate Change Conference in Katowice he urged countries to hold temperature rise to 1.5 degrees Celsius. In 2019, he opened the Pacific Climate Change Centre in Apia, Samoa, to serve as a regional research center on the issue. Other issues he focused on included nuclear waste shipments and waste dumping by fishing boats.

His term as Director-General ended on 3 April 2022. He was replaced by Sefanaia Nawadra.
