= Pacific Regional Environment Programme =

Organization

Secretariat of the Pacific Regional Environment Programme
- Abbreviation: SPREP
- Formation: 16 June 1993
- Type: independent inter-governmental organization
- Legal status: Agreement Establishing SPREP
- Purpose: promote cooperation in the South Pacific Region and to provide assistance in order to protect and improve the environment and to ensure sustainable development for present and future generations (Art.2).
- Headquarters: Apia, Samoa
- Region served: Pacific
- Director General: Leota Kosi Latu
- Main organ: Intergovernmental Meetings (IGM), SPREP Meetings (SM) and Regional Convention COPs
- Staff: 90+
- Website: https://www.sprep.org/

The Secretariat of the Pacific Regional Environment Programme (SPREP) is an intergovernmental organisation based in Apia, Samoa with more than 90 staff members. The organisation is held accountable by the governments and administrations of the Pacific region to ensure the protection and sustainable development of the region's natural resources. The organisation actively promotes the understanding of the connection between Pacific island people and their natural environment and the impact that these have on their sustenance and livelihoods. The organisation was established in 1982. Previously South Pacific Regional Environment Programme, the word "South" was replaced with "Secretariat" in 2004, in recognition of the members north of the equator. The French equivalent name is Programme régional océanien de l’environnement (PROE).

== Members ==
SPREP Members comprise 21 Pacific island countries and territories, and five developed countries* with direct interests in the region:

American Samoa	Australia*	Cook Islands
Federated States of Micronesia	Fiji	France*
French Polynesia	Guam	Kiribati
Marshall Islands	Nauru	New Caledonia
New Zealand*	Niue	Northern Mariana Islands
Palau	Papua New Guinea	Samoa
Solomon Islands	Tokelau	Tonga
Tuvalu	United Kingdom*	Vanuatu
Wallis and Futuna		

=== Former members ===
- United States

== Conventions ==
SPREP oversees the following agreements, conventions and protocols, each of which is enacted by International treaty:

- Agreement establishing the South Pacific Regional Environment Programme Apia, 1993
  - Convention on Conservation of Nature in the South Pacific (Apia Convention) 1976 (Suspended in 2006)
  - Convention for the Protection of the Natural Resources and Environment of the South Pacific Region (Noumea Convention) 1986
    - Protocol for the Prevention of Pollution of the South Pacific Region by Dumping (Dumping Protocol of the Noumea Convention) 1986
    - Protocol concerning Co-operation in Combating Pollution Emergencies in the South Pacific Region (Emergencies Protocol of the Noumea Convention) 1986
  - Convention to Ban the Importation into Forum Island Countries of Hazardous and Radioactive Wastes and to Control the Transboundary Movement and Management of Hazardous Wastes within the South Pacific Region (Waigani Convention) 1995

== Governance ==
The SPREP Annual General Meeting is the main governance mechanism of the organisation. SPREP Members meet once every year to discuss the workplan and budget and other matters relating to administration and corporate affairs. The 25th SPREP Meeting was held in the Republic of the Marshall Islands in October 2014.

SPREP began life in the late 1970s as a joint initiative of SPC, SPEC, ESCAP and UNEP - eventually functioning as a component of UNEP's Regional Seas Programme. The Programme received further impetus as a result of the 1982 Conference on the Human Environment in the South Pacific. Following a period of expansion and long deliberations, SPREP left SPC in Nouméa in 1992 and relocated to Samoa. It achieved autonomy as an independent inter-governmental organisation with the signing of the Agreement Establishing SPREP in Apia on 16 June 1993.

SPREP (the Secretariat) is the region’s key inter-governmental organisation for environment and sustainable development, and is one of several inter-governmental agencies comprising the Council of Regional Organisations in the Pacific (CROP). Under the Agreement Establishing SPREP, the purposes of SPREP are to promote cooperation in the South Pacific Region and to provide assistance in order to protect and improve the environment and to ensure sustainable development for present and future generations (Art.2). SPREP's vision is: the Pacific environment - sustaining our livelihoods and natural heritage in harmony with our cultures. SPREP also functions as the Secretariat of 2 (formerly 3) regional conventions: the Nouméa Convention, the Waigani Convention and the Apia Convention (suspended).
