= Samoa Police Service =

Law enforcement agency

Agency overview
- Legal personality: Police force

Jurisdictional structure
- Operations jurisdiction: Samoa
- General nature: Local civilian police

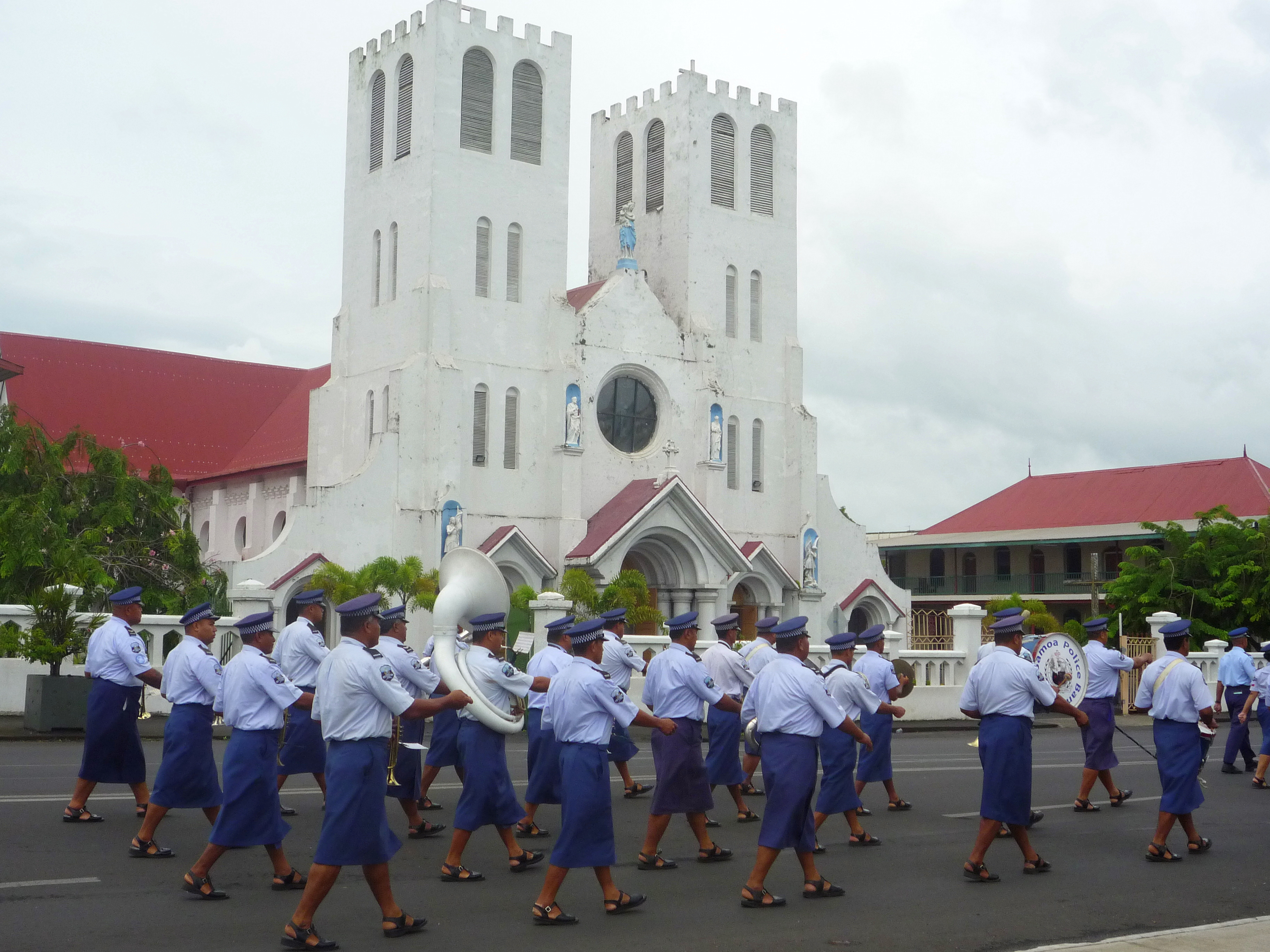
The Royal Samoan Police Band

The Samoa Police Service is the unitary national police force of Samoa.

In 2022 the numbers of officers increased numbering around 900-1,100 Samoan police officers. Duties include maintaining the correctional facilities, maintaining order in traffic, assisting in search and rescue, identifying and addressing crimes of most concern to the community, raiding drug and gun dealers, and upgrading and improving intelligence for crime investigation and national security. There are three corrections facilities in Samoa: Tafaigata Prison, Vaiaata Prison and a juvenile facility.

== Description ==
=== Operations ===
The Samoa Police Service operated the Guardian-class patrol boat Nafanua II before it ran aground in 2021. Nafanua II was provided to Samoa by the Australian Government as part of the Pacific Patrol Boat Program. Nafanua II was delivered on August 16, 2019, replacing the original Nafanua, delivered in March 1988. The original Nafanua underwent a $T5.5 million refit in Australia in December 2004. Between 1988 and 2004, the Nafanua sailed a total of 118,000 nautical miles (219,000 km; 136,000 mi), performed over 12,000 hours of fisheries patrol and was involved in the search and rescue of over 400 people.

In replacement of Nafanua II, the Australian Government ordered another Guardian-class patrol boat on 2 November 2022. On 22 November 2023, the Australian Department of Defence delivered the Nafanua III to the Somoa Police Service at HMAS Stirling.

Police officers are generally unarmed but may be armed in exceptional circumstances with the approval of the Minister of Police.

=== International operations ===
Samoa has provided police officers to the Regional Assistance Mission to Solomon Islands since July 2003. Samoan Police officer Laulala Siitia is contingent commander of the Samoan police serving as part of RAMSI's Participating Police Force (PPF). Samoa's police service also served in East Timor as part of a United Nations peacekeeping effort to maintain peace and security in the region in 2000.

=== Crime in Samoa ===
Reports of organized gang members growing and selling cannabis have become common in Samoa. In the early hours of 7 May 2012, Samoan police officers received gunshot wounds during a police raid in Faleatiu village near Apia. Sources said that there was a shoot-out between police and people involved living on this particular land when the drug raid took place. Faleatiu village has been the target of police investigations as one of the main sources of cannabis.

In recent years, reports of organized crime occurring in parts of Samoa were noted. The growing of cannabis and selling of it. The import of weapons into Samoa from neighbouring countries including the United States has raised alarming concern over the possibility of increased gun crime in Samoa and the possible import of these weapons to New Zealand, which was described in a New Zealand journalist's report as a 'warzone' if this were to be.

=== Overseas support ===
Australia will build a new police headquarters in the Samoan capital Apia as part of a major initiative to strengthen the police service. The Samoa Australia Police Partnership operates within the framework of the Samoa Australia Partnership for Development and is founded upon an institutional relationship between the Samoa Police Service and the Australia Federal Police (AFP) within the broader context of external support to Samoa’s law and justice sector. The Samoa Australia Police Partnership is a component of the Pacific Police Development Program, which is a Government of Australia initiative supporting a broad range of bilateral and multi-country police capacity development initiatives throughout the Pacific region.

The Samoa Australia Police Partnership commenced in January 2009, prior to which AusAID provided support for police capacity development under the Samoa Police Project (SPP) (2004–2008). While it is widely recognized that noticeable improvements in SPS performance were achieved during the life of the SPP, it is also acknowledged that ongoing assistance to the SPS is required. With a new Commissioner having been appointed in September 2009, and a new senior executive, it is an opportune time for the AFP to forge a new program of assistance to the SPS.
