= Misa Telefoni Retzlaff =

Samoan author and former politician

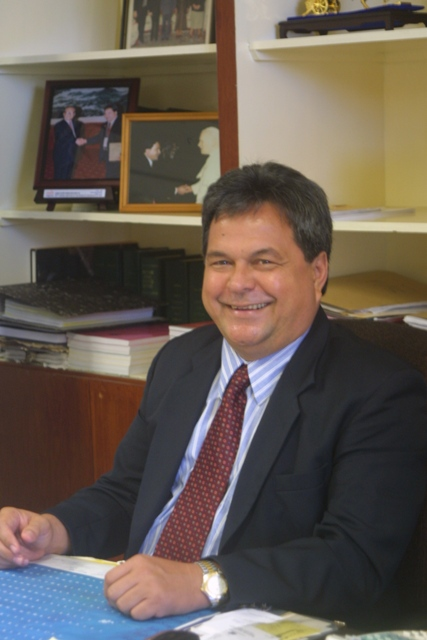

Deputy Prime Minister of Samoa
- In office 19 March 2001 – 20 March 2011
- Prime Minister: Tuilaʻepa Saʻilele Malielegaoi
- Preceded by: Tuilaʻepa Saʻilele Malielegaoi
- Succeeded by: Fonotoe Pierre Lauofo
Other cabinet posts
Minister of Trade, Commerce, Industry and Labour
In office 24 April 2006 – 20 March 2011
Preceded by	Hans Joachim Keil III
Succeeded by	Fonotoe Pierre Lauofo
Minister of Tourism
In office 24 April 2006 – 20 March 2011
Preceded by	Hans Joachim Keil III
Succeeded by	Tuilaʻepa Saʻilele Malielegaoi
Minister of Finance
In office 20 March 2001 – 19 March 2006
Succeeded by	Tapunuu Niko Lee Hang
Minister of Health
In office 26 April 1996 – 20 March 2001
Preceded by	Sala Vaimili Uili II
Succeeded by	Mulitalo Siafausa Vui

Member of the Samoan Parliament for Falelatai & Samatau
- In office 26 February 1988 – 4 March 2011
- Preceded by: Lupematasila Faʻamalaga
- Succeeded by: Lemi Taefu

Personal details
- Born: Hermann Theodor Retzlaff; 21 May 1952 (age 74) Apia, Territory of Western Samoa (Now Samoa)
- Party: Human Rights Protection Party
- Spouse: Sarah Pulepule Young
- Education: University of Auckland

Misa Telefoni Retzlaff (born Hermann Theodor Retzlaff, 21 May 1952) is a Samoan author and retired politician who served as the deputy prime minister of Samoa and deputy leader of the Human Rights Protection Party from 2001 to 2011. A member of the Human Rights Protection Party, Retzlaff was also minister of finance from 2006 to 2011.

== Background ==
Retzlaff is of German-Swedish-Samoan descent, having inherited his German ancestry from his paternal grandfather. His name "Telefoni", is the name that was given by the Samoan community in the early twentieth century, to his grandfather, when he arrived in the German colony, as a public servant of the postal services, to introduce the telephone to the country. He was educated at Marist Brothers in Apia and King's College in Auckland, New Zealand. He studied law at the University of Auckland, graduating in 1974. After returning to Samoa, he studied to become a Certified Public Accountant, graduating in 1977, before going on to practice law. He was appointed Attorney-General of Samoa in 1986. His eldest son Lemalu Herman Retzlaff was subsequently appointed and also served as Attorney General of Samoa in 2016.

== Political career ==
In 1988, he resigned his position as Attorney-general to run for election, winning the seat of Falelatai & Samatau. Initially part of the opposition, he joined the government of Tofilau Eti Alesana in 1991 as Minister of Agriculture, Forests, Fisheries and Shipping. In 1996 he became Minister of Health, and in 2001, Deputy Prime Minister and Minister of Finance. In 2006 he was appointed Minister of Tourism, Trade, Labor and Commerce. He retired at the 2011 general election.

== Publications ==
Retzlaff has had two books published; "Love and Money", a love story about the richest young bachelor in Auckland New Zealand falling in love with and marrying the young Samoan kitchen help from his exclusive boarding school; and "To Thine Own Self be True", a collection of articles, speeches and poems. In 2021 he published an autobiography, Tautua – Memoirs of a Public Servant.

Legislative Assembly of Samoa
Preceded by Lupematasila Faʻamalaga	Member of Parliament for Falelatai & Samatau; 1988–2011	Succeeded by Lemi Taefu
Political offices
Preceded by Sala Vaimili Uili II	Minister of Health; 1996–2001	Succeeded by Mulitalo Siafausa Vui
Vacant Title last held by Tuilaʻepa Saʻilele Malielegaoi	Deputy Prime Minister of Samoa; 2001–2011	Succeeded by Fonotoe Pierre Lauofo
Preceded by Tuilaʻepa Saʻilele Malielegaoi	Minister of Finance; 2001–2006	Succeeded by Tapunuu Niko Lee Hang
Preceded by Hans Joachim Keil III	Minister of Tourism; 2006–2011	Succeeded by Tuilaʻepa Saʻilele Malielegaoi
Preceded by Hans Joachim Keil III	Minister of Trade, Commerce, Industry and Labour; 2006–2011	Succeeded by Fonotoe Pierre Lauofo
Party political offices
Vacant Title last held by Tuilaʻepa Saʻilele Malielegaoi	Deputy Leader of the Human Rights Protection Party; 2001–2011	Succeeded by Fonotoe Pierre Lauofo
