= Toi Aukuso Cain =

Samoan politician

Toi Aukuso Cain (4 January 1959 – April 18, 2009) was a Samoan politician.

He was elected Member of Parliament for the Faleata West constituency in 1979, and served for twenty years until his arrest. He served for a time as Minister of Post and Telecommunications.

In 1999, Cain was arrested with fellow politician Leafa Vitale and the latter's son Eletise Vitale in connection with the murder of Luagalau Leva'ula Kamu, the then Minister of Works. Kamu was shot dead by Eletise Vitale at a party celebration for the Human Rights Protection Party. The shooter pleaded guilty to the killing, and gave evidence implicating his father and Cain in the plotting of the murder. All three men were sentenced to death, a sentence subsequently commuted to life imprisonment by head of State Malietoa Tanumafili II.

Cain remained in prison until a few days before his death, when he was admitted to Tupua Tamasese Meaole Hospital to receive treatment for liver cancer. He died in hospital on April 18, 2009.
