= Leafa Vitale =

Samoan politician

Leafa Vitale was a Minister of Works and Minister of Women's Affairs in Samoa, who along with Toi Aukuso, former Minister of Post and Telecommunications, plotted the assassination of Samoan Minister of Public Works Luagalau Levaula Kamu in 1999.

Aside from the Minister of Works, the two former Ministers (who were still in Parliament at the time) had also planned to have the Prime Minister Tuilaʻepa Saʻilele Malielegaoi, the Chief Justice, New Zealand's High Commissioner to Samoa, and Minister of Lands and Environment Tuala Kerslake assassinated. Leafa, Toi and Leafa's son Eletise Leafa Vitale (who carried out the assassination) were sentenced to death but had their sentences commuted to life sentences by the Head of State Malietoa Tanumafili II in 2000. Vitale was paroled on the basis of ill-health in June 2010.

Leafa was Minister of Works under Tofilau but became Minister of Women's Affairs when Tuilaʻepa became prime minister. He was among the members of Tofilau's cabinet who were named for corruption in the 1994 Report to the Samoan Parliament by then Controller and Chief Auditor Rimoni Ah Chong.

Leafa Vitale was among the 35 criminals pardoned by Tui Ātua Tupua Tamasese Efi on June 1, 2012, during celebrations marking the country's 50th anniversary of independence.
