= Samoan patrol vessel Nafanua II =

Patrol boat of Samoa

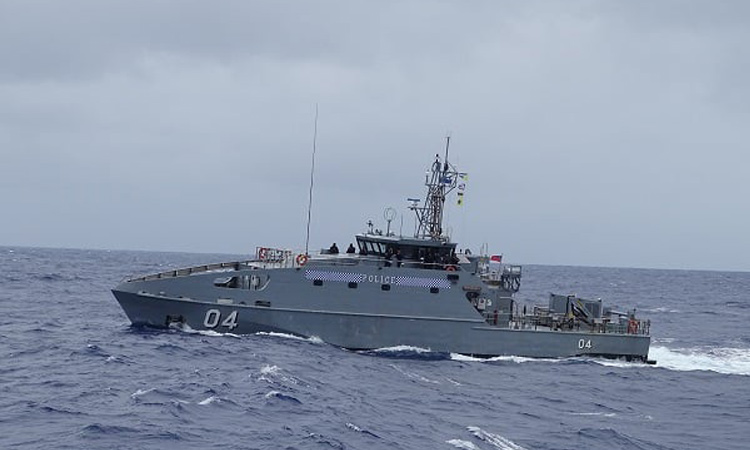
- Nafanua II

History

Samoa
- Name: Nafanua II
- Builder: Austal
- Commissioned: 16 August 2019
- Identification: IMO number: 4734130; MMSI number: 561006000; Callsign: 5WDI
- Fate: Damaged beyond repair after running aground.
- Status: out of service

General characteristics
- Class & type: Guardian-class patrol boat
- Length: 39.5 m (129 ft 7 in)
- Beam: 8 m (26 ft 3 in)
- Draft: 0.76 m (2.5 ft)
- Propulsion: 2 × Caterpillar 3516C diesels, 2 shafts
- Speed: 20 knots (37 km/h; 23 mph)
- Range: 3,000 nmi (5,600 km; 3,500 mi) at 12 knots (22 km/h; 14 mph)
- Armament: Australia provides the ships without armament, but they are designed to be able to mount heavy machine guns, or an autocannon of up to 30 mm on the foredeck

Nafanua II (04) was a Guardian-class patrol boat built in Australia for Samoa. It replaced the original Nafanua, supplied to Samoa three decades earlier. Her crew were drawn from the Samoan Police Force.

Australia supplied 22 Pacific Forum-class patrol boats to 12 of its smaller Pacific Forum allies when the United Nations Convention on the Law of the Sea established that maritime nations controlled an economic exclusion zone 200 kilometres (120 mi) off their coasts.

== Design ==
Australia designed the vessels with commercial off the shelf components, rather than cutting edge military grade components, to make it easier to maintain the vessels in small, isolated shipyards. The vessels have a maximum speed of 20 knots (37 km/h; 23 mph), and approximately a 20-member crew. They are able to launch and retrieve a pursuit boat from a stern launching ramp without bringing the vessel to a halt.

On 2 April 2019, Police Commissioner Fuiavailili Egon Keil hinted that keeping her crew safe might require installing a deck gun. Australia designed the vessels to be capable of mounting secondary machine guns, and a primary weapon of up to 30 millimeters (1.18 inches) in caliber. Australia delivered the vessels complete, except for armament, and the original Nafanua and her sister ships were armed only with small arms.

Nafanua II was the first Samoan patrol vessel with a mixed gender crew.

== Operational history ==
Manufacturer Austal handed Nafanua II over to Samoan representatives at its plant in Henderson, Western Australia, on 16 August 2019. Present at the handover ceremony, representing Samoa, were Fiame Naomi Mata'afa, and Fuivaili’ili Egon Keil, Samoa's Deputy Prime Minister and Commissioner of Police. Representing Australia were Linda Reynolds and Melissa Price, Minister for Defence and Minister for Defence Industry.

Samoa agreed that Nafanua II would cooperate under the Niue Treaty Subsidiary Agreement to conduct fishery surveillance as it transited Australian waters, on its first voyage to Samoa, even though she had yet to be officially commissioned. Nafanua II arrived in Apia on 4 October 2019.

On 5 August 2021 the vessel ran aground on a reef near Salelologa wharf while transporting police officers to Savai'i to manage a protest. It was successfully salvaged on 15 September and loaded onto a barge for transport to Australia. The commander of the vessel, Superintendent Taito Sefo Hunt, was subsequently charged with five counts of misconduct. A hearing into the charges by the police disciplinary tribunal began on 4 November 2021. On 21 December 2021 the officer-in-charge of the ship at the time of the accident, Superintendent Hunt, was found guilty on three charges of negligence by a police disciplinary tribunal. On 4 January he was fined $2,000 tala and demoted from superintendent to corporal.

On 5 March 2022 the Samoa Observer reported that the vessel was "beyond economical repair".

== Replacement ==
In March 2022 the Japanese government offered to fund a smaller vessel to enable maritime patrols until a decision on a permanent replacement was made. The vessel, Tilafaiga, arrived in June 2023.

On 2 June 2022 Australian Foreign Minister Penny Wong announced that the Australian government would gift Samoa two replacement patrol ships. The first replacement, Nafanua III, will be delivered in November 2023.
