= Fepulea'i Attila Ropati =

President of the Land and Titles Court of Samoa

President of the Land and Titles Court of Samoa
- In office 1 August 2016 – 31 October 2022
- Nominated by: Tuila'epa Sa'ilele Malielegaoi
- Appointed by: Tui Ātua Tupua Tamasese Efi
- Preceded by: Tuala Tagaloa Sale Kerslake
- Succeeded by: Lesatele Rapi Vaai

Personal details
- Education: University of the South Pacific; University of Tasmania

Fepulea'i Attila Ropati (born 1968) is a Samoan judge who served as President of the Land and Titles Court of Samoa from 2016 to 2022.

Fepulea'i is from the village of Saleaula. He was educated at the University of the South Pacific, University of New England and the University of Tasmania. He has previously worked as a lawyer, for the Samoa Shipping Corporation and for the Land and Titles Court. From 2008 to 2016 he was Clerk of the Legislative Assembly of Samoa. In July 2016 he was appointed as President of the Land and Titles Court, and he was sworn in on 1 August 2016.

== Controversy ==
In December 2017 Fepulea'i smashed a bottle on the head of a security guard at an end of year party. In March 2018 he took leave from his position as President of the court until criminal charges were resolved. He subsequently pleased guilty to a charge of actual bodily harm, and was discharged without conviction. Following an appeal from the Attorney-General, a re-trial was ordered, and in February 2019 Fepulea'i was convicted of intentionally causing bodily harm and fined US$3,500. In April 2019 he resigned from office, then changed his mind. He was subsequently suspended by the Judicial Services Commission, which recommended he be removed from office. A motion to terminate his position was put before the Legislative Assembly of Samoa, but failed to pass by the required two-thirds majority. Then Deputy-Prime Minister Fiamē Naomi Mataʻafa spoke strongly for his removal.

In August 2021 Fepulea'i and the entire Lands and Titles Court boycotted the welcome ceremony for the newly appointed Minister of Justice.

In November 2021 the Land and Titles Court announced that former Electoral Commissioner Faimalomatumua Mathew Lemisio would be appointed Deputy President of the Court. Following the announcement, Minister of Justice Matamua Vasati Pulufana suspended the appointment process on the grounds that a "drafting error" in the Land and Titles Bill meant that there were no legal provisions for appointments to the court. Attorney-General Su'a Hellene Wallwork subsequently issued a formal opinion that the lack of appointment provisions meant that no appointments could be made until further legislation had been passed, and that the Komisi o Fa'amasinoga o Fanua ma Suafa, intended to be an appointments and supervisory body for the court, was legally powerless. On this basis, Matamua ordered the Ministry of Justice and Courts Administration not to progress the appointments in any way. Despite this, on 17 December 2021 Fepulea'i purported to swear in Faimalomatumua and two other judges without warrants of appointment from the O le Ao o le Malo, claiming the appointments were "made by God". Prime Minister Fiamē Naomi Mataʻafa denounced the appointments as illegal.

On 29 October 2022 the Samoan cabinet told Ropati to vacate office by 1 November. On 30 October the Samoa Observer reported that Supreme Court justice Lesatele Rapi Vaai would be sworn in to replace him. On 1 November the supreme Court refused to grant an interim injunction against Ropati's ousting, and Vaii was sworn in as President of the court on 2 November 2022.

In June 2024 the Supreme Court ruled that Fepulea'i had been unlawfully removed from office and awarded him $750,000 in compensation.

Legal offices
Preceded by Tuala Tagaloa Sale Kerslake	President of the Land and Titles Court of Samoa; 2016–present	Incumbent
