= Fuiavailili Egon Keil =

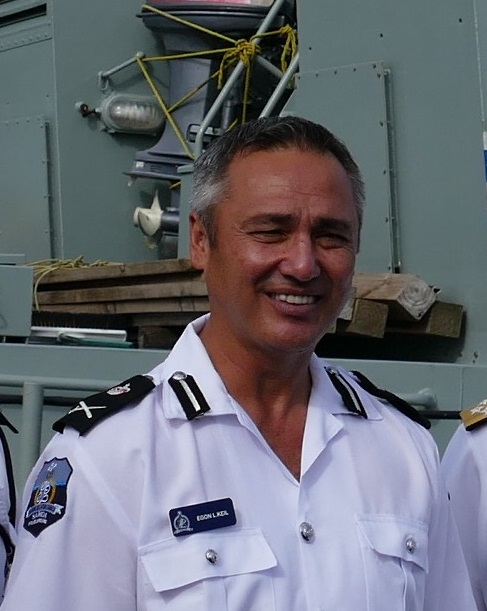

Samoan Police Commissioner
- In office 10 April 2015 – 23 August 2021
- Prime Minister: Tuila'epa Sa'ilele Malielegaoi
- Preceded by: Lilomaiava Fou Taioalo
- Succeeded by: Auapa'au Logoitino Filipo

Fuiavailili Egon Lincoln Keil (born ~1965) was Samoa's Police Commissioner from March 2015 to August 2021.

== Early life ==
Keil is from the village of Palauli. He is the son of businessman Maposua Rudolf Keil.

He was educated at California State University, Dominguez Hills, graduating with a B.Sc. in criminal justice administration. After working for a year as a prison guard in the Utah Department of Corrections, he joined the Los Angeles Police Department in 1995. He served for 17 years with the LAPD, rising to the rank of Assistant Watch Commander.

He returned to Samoa in 2012, where he operated a car repair business and on the board of the Samoa Fire and Emergency Services Authority.

== Police commissioner ==
In March 2015 Keil was appointed Samoan Police Commissioner, the first person from outside the Samoan police to be appointed to the job. When appointed he announced his intention to improve police accountability, and shortly after being appointed he suspended four police officers for being involved in criminal activity. He subsequently introduced compulsory training for police officers. In December 2015 another three police officers were charged with corruption. Keil's attempts at reform led to discontent within the police force, and in December 2015 an anonymous letter was sent to the prime minister and government officials alleging the police were being run "like a military base".

In August 2016 Keil was charged with perjury, unlawful detention, providing false statements, and disorderly conduct over the arrest of a man by armed police in 2015. He was subsequently suspended by Cabinet. All charges were dropped due to lack of evidence in November 2016, but during his suspension 40 police officers signed a petition of no confidence against him. The day after he returned to work he was detained and charged with incitement to murder. He was again suspended, and subsequently charged with 259 charges, including 120 counts of illegal possession of firearms, eight counts of intimidation, six of uttering threatening words, and one count of inciting murder. In February 2017 all charges were again dismissed for lack of evidence. He was reinstated to his position in March 2017.

He was appointed to a second three year term in July 2018. He subsequently oversaw the investigation of the 2019 Samoa assassination plot. and the police's enforcement of emergency orders as part of the 2019 Samoa measles outbreak and COVID-19 pandemic in Samoa. During the 2021 Samoan constitutional crisis Keil accompanied Chief Justice Satiu Simativa Perese to the locked doors of parliament as a sign of support for the rule of law. On 7 July, he announced he would be leaving the country to receive health treatment. He returned to Samoa in late July.

In August 2021 he announced that he would retire when his contract ended in January 2022. On 23 August 2021 he resigned with immediate effect. In July 2022 he was succeeded as police commissioner by Auapa'au Logoitino Filipo.

In November 2021 he was awarded the policing Champion of Change award by the Australasian Council of Women and Policing.
