= Suʻa Hellene Wallwork =

Samoan lawyer and jurist

Attorney-General of Samoa
- In office 4 September 2021 – 13 January 2026 (Note: Interim: 4 September 2021 – 22 December 2022)
- Prime Minister: Fiamē Naomi Mataʻafa
- Preceded by: Savalenoa Mareva Betham Annandale
- Succeeded by: Mauga Precious Chang

Personal details
- Education: University of Auckland

Suʻa Hellene Wallwork-Lamb is a Samoan lawyer and jurist who served as the Attorney-General of Samoa from 2021 to 2026.

Wallwork is from Lefaga and was educated at the University of Auckland. After working in the Office of the Attorney-General, she returned to New Zealand, where she worked for the New Zealand Police and the Commerce Commission and in private practice. In 2013 she returned to Samoa and established a law firm with her husband. In April 2016 she was appointed Sweden's Honorary Consul in Samoa.

In March 2017 she was elected President of the Samoa Law Society. She served as vice-president for the next three years, and was elected president again in 2021. As Vice-president of the society she fronted the society's submissions during the 2021 Samoan constitutional crisis, criticising O le Ao o le Malo Tuimalealiʻifano Vaʻaletoʻa Sualauvi II's attempt to stop parliament from meeting and the Human Rights Protection Party's post-crisis attacks on the judiciary.

She was appointed interim Attorney-General of Samoa on 4 September 2021, following the dismissal of Savalenoa Mareva Betham Annandale for failing to defend the judiciary. She was sworn in on 8 September 2021. Cabinet appointed Wallwork to a full term three-year term on 22 December 2022. In December 2024 she appeared before the International Court of Justice to present Samoa's evidence in its hearings on Obligations of States in respect of climate change.

She declined to apply for another term as attorney-general, and her tenure ended on 13 January 2026. Precious Chang succeeded her in an interim capacity, before being appointed permanently.

She was awarded the title of Suʻa by her village in 2008. In December 2022 she was named one of the Samoa Observer's people of the year.

== Notes ==
Legal offices
Preceded by Savalenoa Mareva Betham Annandale	Attorney-General of Samoa; 2021–2026	Succeeded by Precious Chang as Interim
