= Luagalau Levaula Kamu =

Samoan politician (??–1999)

Minister of Public Works
- In office 26 April 1996 – 16 July 1999
- Prime Minister: Tofilau Eti Alesana; Tuilaepa Aiono Sailele Malielegaoi
- Preceded by: Leafa Vitale

Member of the Samoa Parliament for Salega
- In office 26 April 1996 – 16 July 1999
- Succeeded by: Tapua'i To'ese

Personal details
- Died: 16 July 1999 Apia
- Party: Human Rights Protection Party

Luagalau Levaula Kamu (died 16 July 1999) was a Samoan lawyer and Cabinet Minister. His 1999 assassination was the first political assassination in Samoa since independence in 1962.

Kamu trained as a lawyer in New Zealand, at Victoria University of Wellington and the University of Auckland. He served as a chairman of the Samoan Advisory Council in New Zealand, and had practised law in Samoa before entering parliament at the 1996 election. He was appointed to Cabinet as Minister of Public Works by Prime Minister Tofilau Eti Alesana.

Kamu was married to fellow MP Maiava Visekota Kamu-Peteru.

== Assassination ==
Kamu was fatally shot during a social function at St Joseph's College hall, Apia, celebrating the 20th anniversary of the ruling Human Rights Protection Party. Kamu had just introduced Prime Minister Tuilaepa Aiono Sailele Malielegaoi when he stepped into a back room to answer a phone call. He was shot through a hole in the wall and declared dead on arrival at Tupua Tamasese Meaole Hospital in Apia. His assassin, Eletise Leafa Vitale, was arrested ten days later. The killer was the son of Cabinet Minister Leafa Vitale, who had been the previous Minister of Public Works (and who had been dismissed from that position the preceding November following a scandal involving accusations of embezzlement of public funds). Vitale was arrested, along with a second MP, Communications Minister Toi Aukuso. On 9 August 1999 Eletise Vitale pled guilty to murder and was sentenced to death; his sentence was later commuted to life imprisonment. Vitale senior and Toi were convicted of assassination in April 2000, and their death sentences were commuted to life imprisonment in May 2000. The assassination was motivated by corruption, as the Public Works portfolio was a lucrative source of bribes.

Kamu's assassination is commemorated with an annual lecture series on transparency, accountability and good governance.
