= 2021 Samoan constitutional crisis =

Constitutional crisis following 2021 Samoan election

- Date: 22 May 2021 — 23 July 2021 (2 months and 1 day)
- Cause: Refusal by incumbent Prime Minister of Samoa Tuila'epa Sa'ilele Malielegaoi to accept the victory of Fiamē Naomi Mataʻafa in the 2021 Samoan general election
- Participants: • Members of the Legislative Assembly of Samoa • O le Ao o le Malo Tuimalealiʻifano Vaʻaletoʻa Sualauvi II • Supreme Court of Samoa
- Outcome: Ending Tuila'epa Sa'ilele Malielegaoi premiership after 22 years; Appointment of Fiamē Naomi Mataʻafa as prime minister; Faʻatuatua i le Atua Samoa ua Tasi replaces Human Rights Protection Party as the majority government

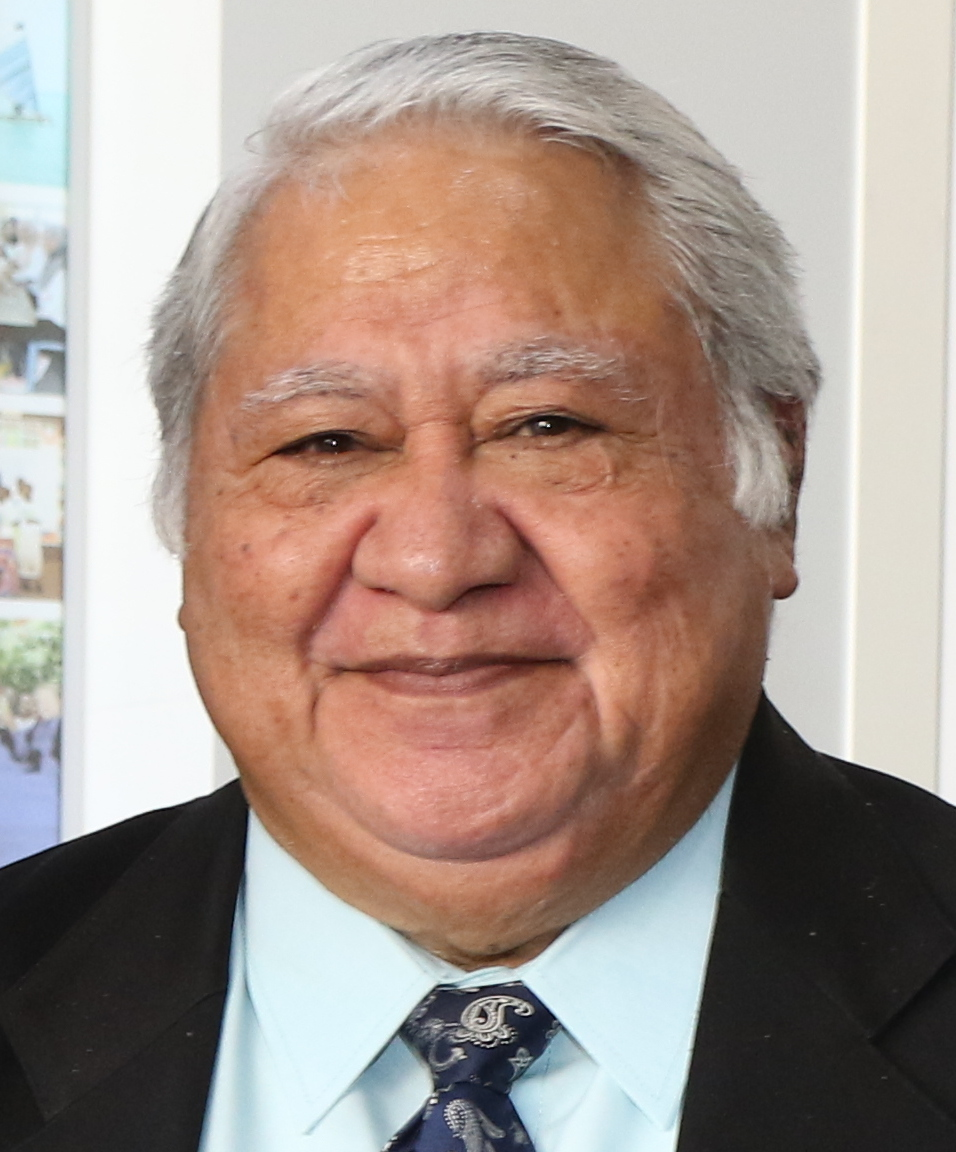
Tuila'epa Sa'ilele Malielegaoi of HRPP

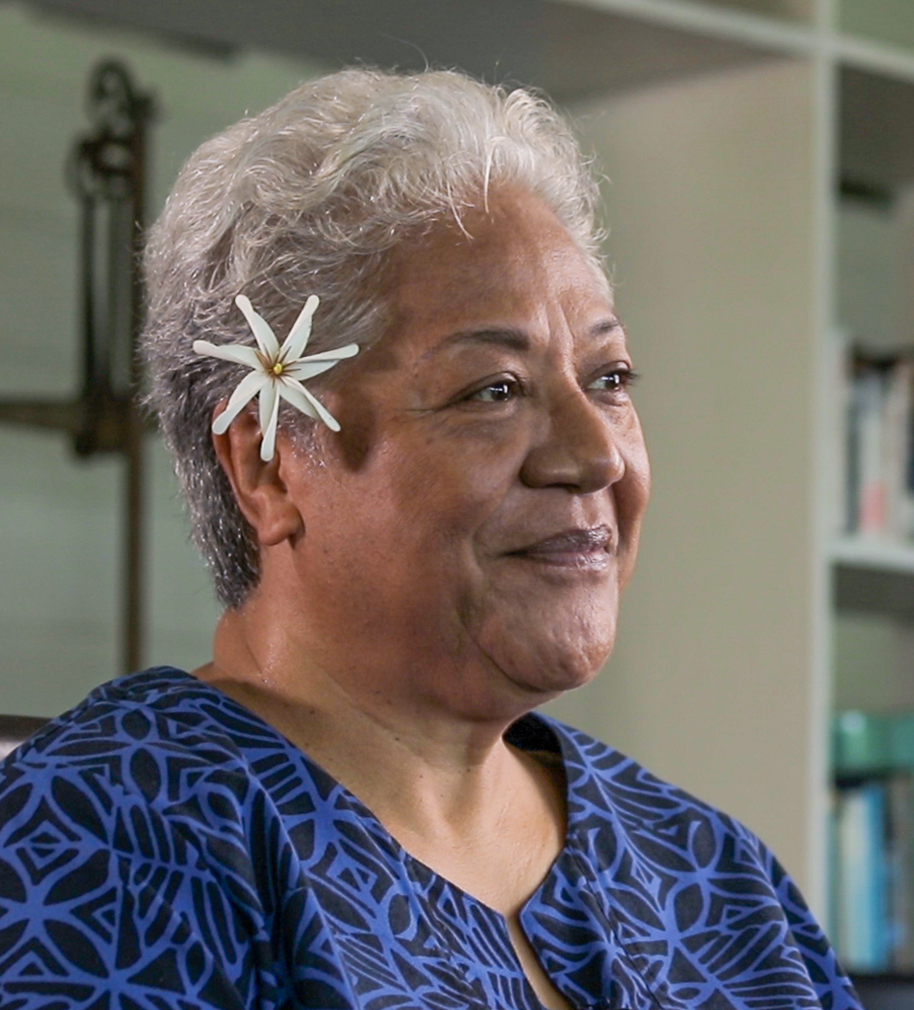
Fiamē Naomi Mataʻafa of FAST

A constitutional crisis began in Samoa on 22 May 2021 when O le Ao o le Malo (Head of State) Tuimalealiʻifano Vaʻaletoʻa Sualauvi II issued a proclamation purporting to prevent the Legislative Assembly from meeting in the wake of the general election in April 2021. Court rulings had upheld the election results, giving a parliamentary majority to the Faʻatuatua i le Atua Samoa ua Tasi (FAST) party, led by Fiamē Naomi Mataʻafa. On 24 May 2021, a makeshift ceremony was held outside of Parliament to swear in Mata'afa as prime minister. On 23 July the Court of Appeal declared that the ceremony was binding and that FAST had been the government since that date.

== Background ==
The election of 9 April 2021 resulted in a 25/25 tie between the ruling Human Rights Protection Party (HRPP) of former prime minister Tuila'epa Sa'ilele Malielegaoi and the FAST party of Fiamē Naomi Mataʻafa, with the remaining seat held by the independent Tuala Iosefo Ponifasio. On 20 April 2021, the Samoan electoral commission declared the HRPP's Ali'imalemanu Alofa Tuuau elected in an extra seat due to the requirement that a minimum of 10% of seats in parliament must be held by women, with Tuuau being the female candidate who most narrowly missed being elected. The next day Ponifasio announced he would join FAST, creating a 26–26 deadlock. On the evening of 4 May 2021, the O le Ao o le Malo purported to dissolve Parliament and ordered new elections for 21 May 2021. A writ for the new election was issued on 5 May 2021.

Both the purported dissolution and the decision to appoint Tuuau were challenged in court, and on 17 May 2021 the Supreme Court of Samoa overturned both decisions, declaring them unconstitutional and void. The court upheld the election results and ordered parliament to meet within 45 days of the original poll. On 21 May 2021, the Court of Appeal of Samoa declined to stay the Supreme Court's ruling over Tuuau's appointment, confirming FAST's parliamentary majority. Immediately after the ruling, the O le Ao o le Malo issued a proclamation convening the opening of the new Parliament on 24 May 2021. That same day, an attempt by the attorney-general to have the proclamation overturned was rejected by the Supreme Court. In doing so, the court ruled that "the ruling of the Supreme Court represents the law in Samoa, and it should be followed. Failure to abide by the law has its own consequences". On the evening of 22 May 2021, the O le Ao o le Malo suspended the proclamation until further notice. He did not elaborate on the reasons behind the suspension, but said that the reasons will be known "in due course".

== Response ==
FAST leader Fiamē Naomi Mataʻafa denounced the suspension as a coup, and announced plans to challenge it in court. On 23 May 2021, the Supreme Court of Samoa met in chambers to hear a motion to overturn the suspension. That afternoon, they ruled the decision was unlawful and that the proclamation convening parliament for 24 May 2021 continued to stand. Caretaker prime minister Malielegaoi responded by saying that the court order was illegal, that the judges had breached state of emergency regulations and ought to be charged, and that he and members of the HRPP would refuse to be sworn in when parliament convened. Later that evening, Speaker of the House Leaupepe Toleafoa Faafisi purported to cancel the swearing-in ceremony, in contravention of the court's order. He added that he took orders from the Head of State, not the Supreme Court.

On the morning of 24 May 2021, FAST MPs and supporters arrived at Parliament to find the doors locked and police surrounding the building. The clerk of parliament refused them entry, in obedience to Faafisi's order. Fiamē Naomi Mata'afa said that MPs would wait for the head of state, and convene parliament on the front steps if necessary. Later that afternoon, FAST Party MPs and Ministers were sworn into office by the newly elected Speaker in a tent outside parliament. Mata'afa was sworn in as Samoa's first female prime minister. Tuilaepa responded by accusing the FAST Party of "treason".

On 26 May 2021, the Supreme Court published a schedule, showing that it planned to hear appeals on the substantive constitutional issues behind the crisis on 31 May 2021, with a decision on 2 or 3 June 2021. On 27 May 2021, attorney-general Savalenoa Mareva Betham Annandale applied to disqualify all serving judges from hearing the case, alleging bias against the HRPP. Later that day, the attorney general's office's rescinded the request and apologized to the judiciary. The motion was subsequently advanced by Ali'imalemanu Alofa Tuuau, and dismissed as an attempt to undermine the integrity of the judiciary.

On 29 May 2021 it was announced that Tuilaepa, Faafisi, Annandale, and the Clerk of the Legislative Assembly had all been cited for contempt of court for failure to respect court orders and using abusive language towards judges.

On 31 May HRPP supporters held a peaceful march to parliament in support of a sixth female MP. This was followed by a meeting of chiefs and clergy outside parliament. Fiamē Naomi Mata'afa and the FAST Party did not attend. That afternoon, the Court of Appeal heard arguments on the appeal on the women's quota. The court reserved its decision, but said it would be delivered "as soon as possible".

On 2 June 2021 the Court of Appeal ruled that the purpose of the clause meant that the number of female MPs should be rounded up to 6, but upheld the Supreme Court's ruling that Tuuau's appointment was unconstitutional and void, on the basis that the quota should be applied not on final results, but after all election petitions and by-elections had been resolved. Caretaker prime minister Tuilaepa claimed victory, and said his party would remain in power as "custodians" of the Government. Prime Minister-elect Fiamē Naomi Mata’afa said that the decision confirmed that her party has the numbers to form a government, and that it was time for the caretaker government to depart.

On 3 June Tuilaepa and Fiamē met to begin negotiations on a government transition. On 7 June talks reached an impasse after just two sessions, with Tuilaepa refusing to either leave office or call parliament unless all election petitions were withdrawn and Tuuau was seated.

On 18 June the election of the HRPP's Seiuli Ueligitone Seiuli was overturned by an election petition, which found him guilty of bribery and treating and banned him from office for 15 years.

On 25 June the Court of Appeal clarified that its 2 June ruling did not prevent Parliament from meeting, and that parliament did not need to wait until all electoral petitions and by-elections are finalised before convening. It also noted that "any suggestions by both parties that [both parties] hold 26 seats each are wrong" and that at the time of the earlier judgement, "F.A.S.T. holds 26 seats and H.R.P.P. had 25".

On 28 June 2021 the Supreme Court found that the 24 May swearing in ceremony was unlawful and void. It ordered parliament to convene within seven days and that any attempt to obstruct this would amount to contempt of court and would result in the 24 May swearing in being declared valid by invoking the doctrine of necessity. On 4 July Head of State Tuimalealiifano Va’aletoa Sualauvi II defied the court's order, and proclaimed that the Legislative Assembly would not sit until August.

On 5 July 2021 the election of HRPP's Fiugalu Eteuati was overturned after a court found him guilty of bribery and treating. On 7 July 2021 HRPP lost another seat after Safata No. 2 MP Nonu Lose Niumata resigned as part of the settlement of an electoral petition, reducing them to just 20 seats.

On 7 July, the HRPP lodged a complaint against Chief Justice Satiu Simativa Perese with the Judicial Services Commission, alleging he was incompetent. That same day, police commissioner Fuiavailili Egon Keil announced he would be leaving the country to receive health treatment.

On 8 July the FAST Party applied to the court to have it revisit the question of necessity and recognise the swearing-in. The Supreme Court noted that the Head of State's purported order delaying the sitting of Parliament violated the court's order of 28 June and that they were exceeding their constitutional powers, but referred the question of remedies to the Court of Appeal.

On 12 July 2021 three more HRPP MPs resigned to settle byelections, leaving FAST with 26 seats and the HRPP with 17.

On 23 July 2021 the Court of Appeal delivered its judgement on the swearing-in ceremony, declaring that it was constitutional and binding, that FAST had been the government since 24 May, and that the HRPP had been unlawfully occupying office since that date. Following the decision former prime minister Tuila'epa Sa'ilele Malielegaoi questioned the impartiality of the judiciary and accused them of "treason", claiming that "leaders are chosen by God". The next day, he began to pack up his office. On 25 July, head of state Tuimalealiifano Vaaletoa Sualauvi II recognised the new government. Tuilaepa admitted defeat and said he looked forward to working with the new government.

== Aftermath ==
On 24 July the new government met with senior public servants to plan the transition process. The prime minister announced that the government would move into its offices on 27 July, that parliament would meet at the earliest opportunity to pass an emergency budget. The government held its first cabinet meeting on 27 July.

Following the court ruling, former prime minister Tuila'epa Sa'ilele Malielegaoi assumed the role of opposition leader. He continued to question the judgement of the Court of Appeal, led protests against the judiciary, and called for the resignation of all the Supreme Court justices. In August 2021 he called on HRPP supporters to assemble at parliament when it first sits to "defend the Constitution".

On 2 September 2021 Attorney-general Savalenoa Mareva Betham Annandale was dismissed from office due to her disrespect for the Supreme Court and her failure to defend the judiciary. She was replaced by Law Society president Su'a Hellene Wallwork. On 17 September 2021 Clerk of the Legislative Assembly Tiatia Graeme Tualaulelei was also dismissed.

The first meeting of the Legislative Assembly was scheduled for 14 September 2021. In the leadup to the sitting, Speaker Papali’i Li’o Taeu Masipau banned HRPP members from attending after they refused to be sworn in by him. Threats against political leaders, including FAST Deputy Leader Laauli Leuatea Polataivao, saw the parliamentary precinct locked down, public access prohibited, and the courts closed. HRPP MPs were forbidden entry on both 14 and 15 September, and on 15 September the police threatened to disperse them by force. On 16 September 2021 the Supreme Court declared that the speaker has an obligation to administer the oath of allegiance to elected parliamentarians, and ordered him to swear in the HRPP MPs. The MPs were sworn in on 17 September.

== International reactions ==
New Zealand Prime Minister Jacinda Ardern called on Samoa to maintain and uphold the rule of law, as well as respecting the democratic outcome of the elections. Ardern added that New Zealand had "complete faith in Samoa's institutions".

Australian Foreign Minister Marise Payne called on all parties to "respect the rule of law and democratic processes".

The Secretary-General of the United Nations "urge[d] leaders in Samoa to find solutions to the current political situation through dialogue".

Pacific Islands Forum Secretary-General Henry Puna said the Forum was ready to offer help if necessary and called on all parties to pursue peaceful means to resolve their difficulties.

Following the swearing-in ceremony, the Federated States of Micronesia became the first foreign government to recognise the new administration. On 27 May 2021, Palau became the second foreign government to recognise the legitimacy of Mataʻafa's administration. Later on, the government of the Marshall Islands joined Palau and Federated States of Micronesia in recognising the FAST government.

Following the Court of Appeal's 25 June ruling, the Australian government called upon both parties to cooperate and convene parliament. The call was echoed by New Zealand and the European Union.

On 9 July Commonwealth Secretary-General Patricia Scotland called for Samoa's leaders to uphold the rule of law and adhere to the values of the Commonwealth charter. On 10 July Pacific Islands Forum Secretary-General Henry Puna reminded Samoa of the values of the Biketawa Declaration, and said that recent court decisions offered a way forward. He was confident that all parties would work together to convene parliament as quickly as possible.

On 20 July the British acting high commissioner to Samoa expressed concern that parliament had not yet met.

Following the Court of Appeal decision on 23 July, the New Zealand government congratulated Fiamē Naomi Mata’afa on her election victory. The Commonwealth welcomed the ruling. The Australian government also congratulated Fiamē and called for all parties to comply with the Court of Appeal's decision. Fiamē was also congratulated by Pacific Islands Forum Secretary-General Henry Puna, Cook Islands prime minister Mark Brown, the European Union and the Chinese government.
