= Land and Titles Court of Samoa =

Specialist court in Samoa

The Land and Titles Court of Samoa is a specialist court dealing with Matai titles and customary land in Samoa.

The Court was originally established in 1903 under the German colonial administration as a Land Commission. It was continued under the New Zealand colonial administration, and formally became a court of record in 1934, though it was not renamed until 1937. It was continued by part IX of the Constitution of Samoa, which provided it with "such composition and with such jurisdiction in relation to Matai titles and customary land as may be provided by Act". Colonial law governing the Court was repealed in 1981, and replaced with the Land and Titles Act 1981.

The Court consists of a President, who must be qualified to be a Judge of the Supreme Court or as a Samoan Judge, and a number of Samoan Judges and Assessors, who must be qualified "by reason of character, ability, standing and reputation". Judges are appointed by the Head of State on the advice of the Judicial Services Commission, and serve until they reach the age of 65 years, but can be removed from office for inability or misbehaviour.

== Jurisdiction ==
Under the Land and Titles Act 1981 it has exclusive jurisdiction over all matters relating to Samoan names and titles, the rights and obligations of title-holders, the interpretation of custom and customary usage, and over disputes relating to customary land. Under section 11 of the Village Fono Act 1990 it is an appeals court for the decisions of village councils. Originally the Supreme Court of Samoa exercised a supervisory jurisdiction over the Court by way of judicial review for conformity with fundamental human rights, but this was removed in 2020 by the Land and Titles Bill.

Parties must make genuine efforts to resolve a dispute before appearing before the court, and the Court may order customary reconciliation or any other dispute resolution process.

The court decides cases by customary Samoan law, and any Act expressed to apply to the Court.

== Controversy ==
In April 2019 the then-President of the Court, Fepulea'i Attila Ropati, was convicted of intentionally causing bodily harm for smashing a bottle of the head of a security guard. The Legislative Assembly of Samoa subsequently refused to remove him from office. In September 2019 Deputy President Sevealii Panapa Vee, Senior Judge Lavea Siaosi Hazelman and Judge Nanai Pologa Ioane were suspended from office following an investigation by the Judicial Services Commission. The appointments of Vee and Ioane were subsequently revoked, while Hazelman was restored to office on the condition that his term not be extended when it expired at the end of 2019.

In August 2021 Fepulea'i and the entire Lands and Titles Court boycotted the welcome ceremony for the newly-appointed Minister of Justice.

In November 2021 the court announced that former Electoral Commissioner Faimalomatumua Mathew Lemisio would be appointed Deputy President of the Court. The position had not been advertised, and the appointment had been made without informing the Minister. Following the announcement, Minister of Justice Matamua Vasati Pulufana suspended the appointment process on the grounds that a "drafting error" in the Land and Titles Bill meant that there were no legal provisions for appointments to the court. Attorney-General Su'a Hellene Wallwork subsequently issued a formal opinion that the lack of appointment provisions meant that no appointments could be made until further legislation had been passed, and that the Komisi o Fa'amasinoga o Fanua ma Suafa, intended to be an appointments and supervisory body for the court, was legally powerless. On this basis, Matamua ordered the Ministry of Justice and Courts Administration not to progress the appointments in any way. Despite this, on 17 December 2021 Fepulea'i purported to swear in Faimalomatumua and two other judges without warrants of appointment from the O le Ao o le Malo, claiming the appointments were "made by God". Prime Minister Fiamē Naomi Mataʻafa denounced the appointments as illegal.

On 14 April 2022 the Supreme Court ordered the Minister of Justice to resume administrative assistance to the court, but found that judges appointed under the Land and Titles Act 1981 continued to have jurisdiction only as expressly saved under the Lands and Titles Act 2020, and had no jurisdiction under the new Act. It recommended that Parliament consider how to remedy the problem.

On 29 October 2022 the Samoan Cabinet told LTC President Fepulea'i Attila Ropati to vacate office by 1 November. On 30 October the Samoa Observer reported that Supreme Court justice Lesatele Rapi Vaai would be sworn in to replace him. Vaii was sworn in as President of the court on 2 November 2022.

In March 2023 three LTC judges appointed under the provisions of the old Act were dismissed and invited to re-apply for their positions as they had been appointed under a provision which no longer existed in the new Act.
