= Western Samoan patrol vessel Nafanua =

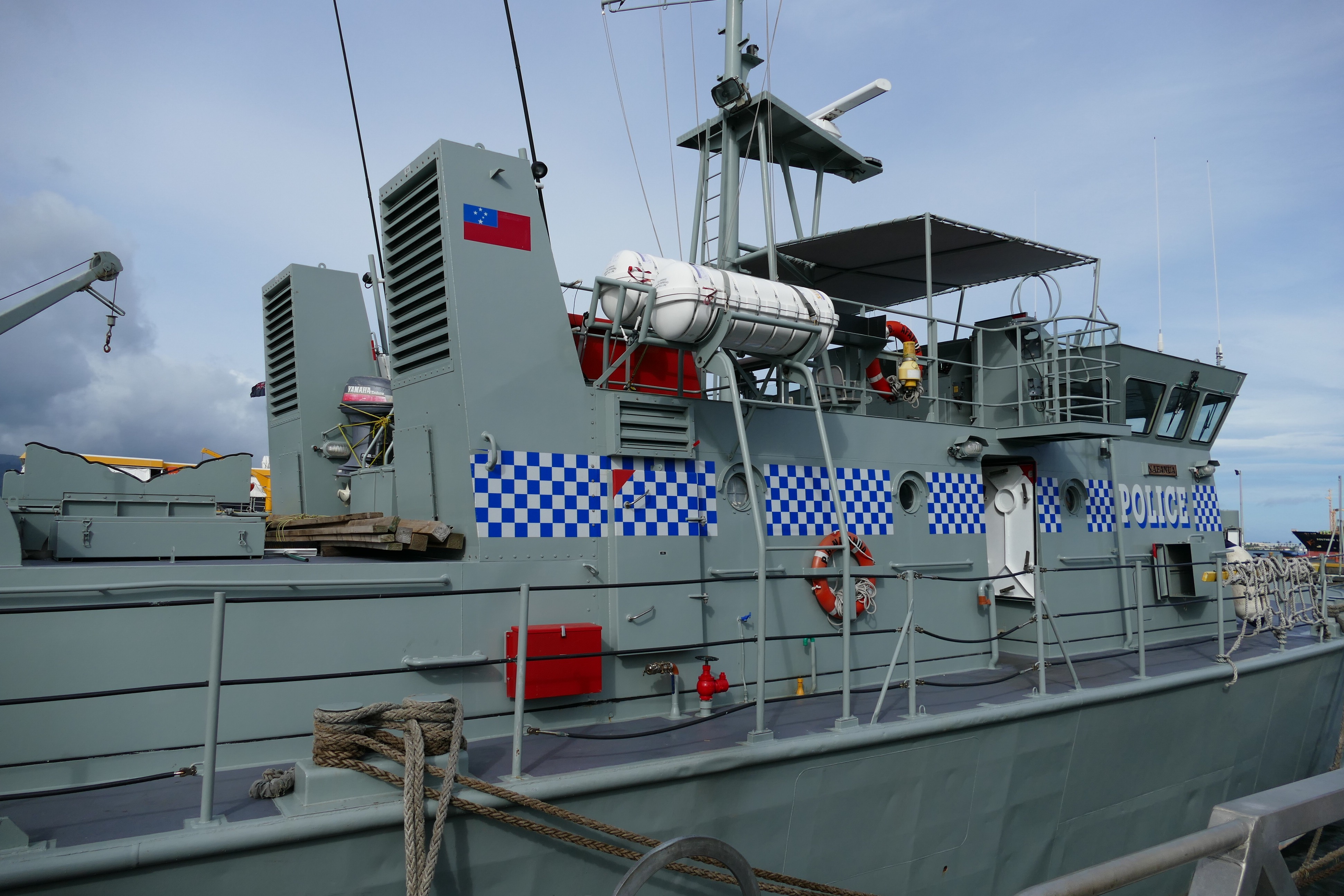
- MV Nafanua in 2016

History

Western Samoa
- Name: Nafanua
- Launched: 1988
- Status: Decommissioned

General characteristics
- Class & type: Pacific Forum-class patrol boat
- Displacement: 162 tons
- Length: 103 ft (31 m)

Nafanua (04) is a Pacific Forum patrol vessel operated by Western Samoa's police. Like her 21 sister ships she was built in Australia. After the United Nations Convention on the Laws of the Seas extended maritime nations' exclusive economic zones (EEZs) to 200 kilometres (110 nmi) Australia agreed to give its smaller neighbours in the Pacific Forum patrol vessels of their own, so they could police their extended EEZs. Nafanua is the ship Australia gave to Samoa.

== Design ==
Nafanua, and her sister ships, were designed to use commercial off-the-shelf components, not cutting edge, military-grade equipment, so that they would be easier to maintain in small, isolated shipyards.

== Operational history ==
In 2008 Ombudsman Maiava Iulai Toma chaired a commission of inquiry into the smuggling of weapons from American Samoa aboard the Nafanua. The inquiry found police commissioner Papalii Lorenese Neru and the Nafanua's captain in breach of duty and recommended a criminal investigation, but the latter recommendation was ignored by the government.

In September 2014 Nafanua rescued four fishermen from American Samoa, whose vessel had broken down, who were found adrift 185 miles south of Apia.

In October 2014 the government agreed for Nafanua to patrol neighbouring Cook Islands's waters, because their patrol vessel, Te Kukupa, was undergoing a major refit in Australia.

Royal Australian Navy sailors visited Nafanua in June 2018 to provide technical assistance.

Nafanua began its final journey to Australia, to be recycled, on 13 June 2019. Her crew will be trained to use her Guardian-class replacement, Nafanua II.

== Replacement ==
Australia started building a class of replacements for the original Pacific Forum patrol vessels, in 2017. Nafanua's replacement will be named Nafanua II.
