= Outline of Samoa =

Island nation in the South Pacific Ocean

The Flag of Samoa

The Coat of arms of Samoa

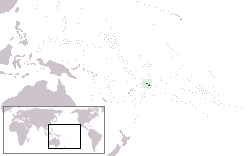
The location of Samoa

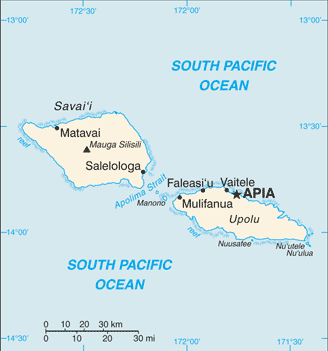
An enlargeable map of the Independent State of Samoa

The following outline is provided as an overview of and topical guide to Samoa:

Samoa – sovereign island nation located in the western Samoan Islands archipelago in the South Pacific Ocean. Previous names were Samoa from 1900 to 1919, and Western Samoa from 1914 to 1997. It was admitted to the United Nations on 15 December 1976. The entire island group, inclusive of American Samoa, was known by Europeans as the Navigator Islands before the 20th century because of the Samoans' seafaring skills.

== General reference ==
- Pronunciation:
- Common English country name: Samoa, archaic Western Samoa
- Official English country name: The Independent State of Samoa
- Common endonym(s):
- Official endonym(s):
- Adjectival(s): Samoan
- Demonym(s): Samoan
- Etymology: Name of Samoa
- ISO country codes: WS, WSM, 882
- ISO region codes: See ISO 3166-2:WS
- Internet country code top-level domain: .ws

== Geography of Samoa ==
Geography of Samoa

- Samoa is: a country
- Location:
  - Western Hemisphere and Southern Hemisphere
  - Pacific Ocean
    - South Pacific Ocean
      - Oceania
        - Polynesia
  - Time zone: Samoa Standard Time (UTC+13)
  - Extreme points of Samoa
    - High: Mauga Silisili on Savai'i 1,857 m (6,093 ft)
    - Low: South Pacific Ocean 0 m
  - Land boundaries: none
  - Coastline: South Pacific Ocean 403 km
- Population of Samoa: 188,540 (2008) - 178th most populous country
- Area of Samoa: 2,831 km^{2}
- Atlas of Samoa

=== Environment of Samoa ===
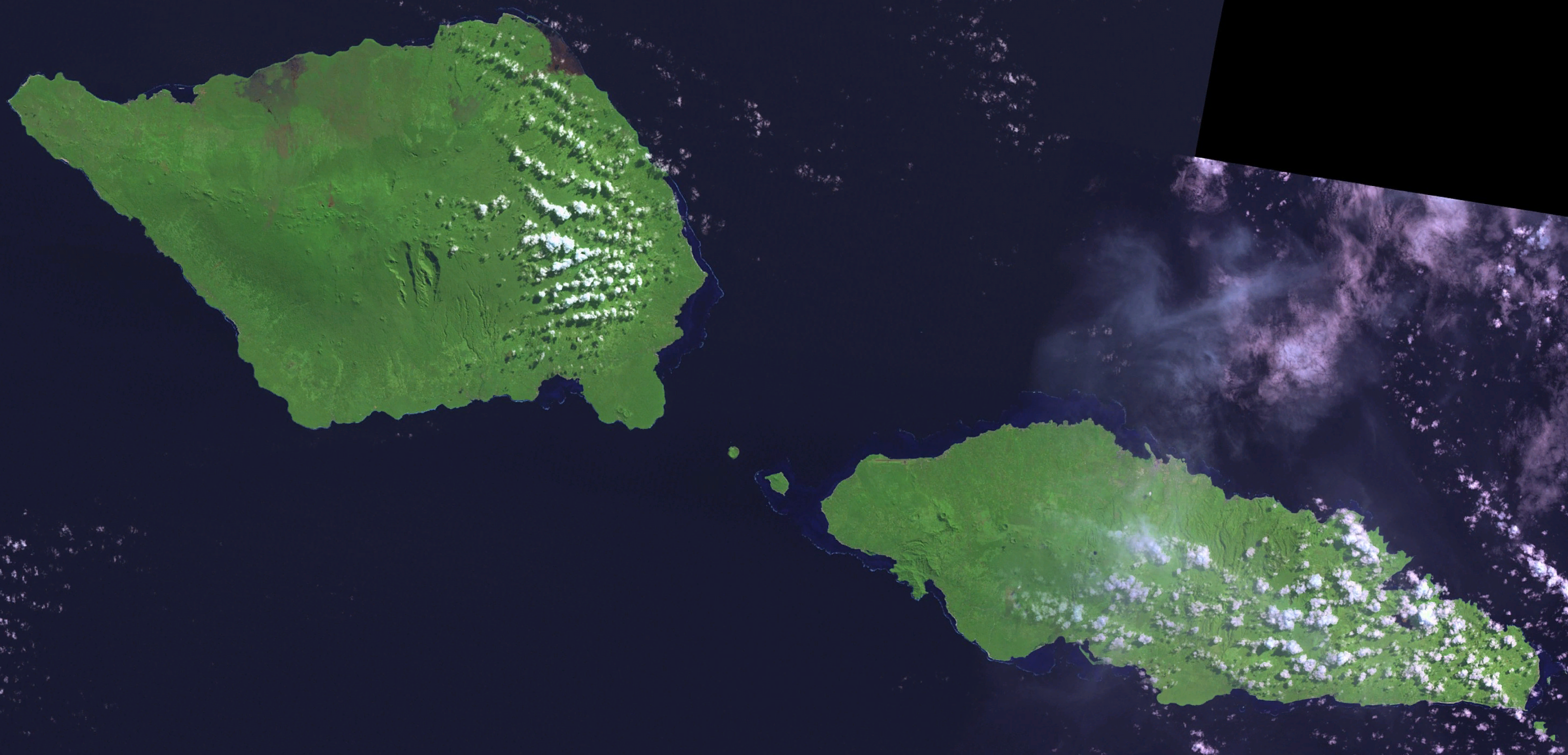
An enlargeable satellite image of Samoa

- Climate of Samoa
- Renewable energy in Samoa
- Geology of Samoa
- Protected areas of Samoa
  - Biosphere reserves in Samoa
  - National parks of Samoa
- Wildlife of Samoa
  - Fauna of Samoa
    - Birds of Samoa
    - Mammals of Samoa
    - Flora of Samoa

==== Natural geographic features of Samoa ====
- Islands of Samoa
- Lakes of Samoa
- Mountains of Samoa
  - Volcanoes in Samoa
- Rivers of Samoa
  - Waterfalls of Samoa
- Valleys of Samoa
- World Heritage Sites in Samoa: None

=== Regions of Samoa ===
Regions of Samoa

==== Ecoregions of Samoa ====
List of ecoregions in Samoa

- Ecoregions in Samoa

==== Administrative divisions of Samoa ====
Administrative divisions of Samoa

- Districts of Samoa

===== Districts of Samoa =====
Districts of Samoa

=== Demography of Samoa ===
Demographics of Samoa

== Government and politics of Samoa ==
Politics of Samoa

- Form of government: parliamentary republic
- Capital of Samoa: Apia
- Elections in Samoa
- Political parties in Samoa
- State-owned enterprises of Samoa
- Statutory Bodies of Samoa

=== Branches of the government of Samoa ===
Government of Samoa

==== Executive branch of the government of Samoa ====
- Head of state: O le Ao o le Malo, Tuimalealiʻifano Vaʻaletoʻa Sualauvi II
- Head of government: Prime Minister of Samoa, Laʻauli Leuatea Schmidt
- Cabinet of Samoa
- Government Ministries of Samoa

==== Legislative branch of the government of Samoa ====
- Legislative Assembly of Samoa (unicameral)

==== Judicial branch of the government of Samoa ====
Court system of Samoa

- Court of Appeal of Samoa (supreme court)

=== Constitutional Offices in Samoa ===
- The Office of the Attorney General
- The Audit Office
- The Office of the Ombudsman
- The Public Service Commission
- Clerk of the Legislative Assembly

=== Foreign relations of Samoa ===
Foreign relations of Samoa

- Diplomatic missions in Samoa
- Diplomatic missions of Samoa

==== International organization membership ====
The Independent State of Samoa is a member of:

- African, Caribbean, and Pacific Group of States (ACP)
- Asian Development Bank (ADB)
- Commonwealth of Nations
- Food and Agriculture Organization (FAO)
- Group of 77 (G77)
- International Bank for Reconstruction and Development (IBRD)
- International Civil Aviation Organization (ICAO)
- International Criminal Court (ICCt)
- International Development Association (IDA)
- International Federation of Red Cross and Red Crescent Societies (IFRCS)
- International Finance Corporation (IFC)
- International Fund for Agricultural Development (IFAD)
- International Labour Organization (ILO)
- International Maritime Organization (IMO)
- International Monetary Fund (IMF)
- International Olympic Committee (IOC)
- International Red Cross and Red Crescent Movement (ICRM)
- International Telecommunication Union (ITU)
- International Trade Union Confederation (ITUC)
- Inter-Parliamentary Union (IPU)
- Multilateral Investment Guarantee Agency (MIGA)
- Organisation for the Prohibition of Chemical Weapons (OPCW)
- Pacific Islands Forum (PIF)
- Secretariat of the Pacific Community (SPC)
- South Pacific Regional Trade and Economic Cooperation Agreement (Sparteca)
- United Nations (UN)
- United Nations Conference on Trade and Development (UNCTAD)
- United Nations Educational, Scientific, and Cultural Organization (UNESCO)
- Universal Postal Union (UPU)
- World Customs Organization (WCO)
- World Health Organization (WHO)
- World Intellectual Property Organization (WIPO)
- World Meteorological Organization (WMO)
- World Trade Organization (WTO) (observer)

=== Law and order in Samoa ===
Law of Samoa

- Constitution of Samoa
- Crime in Samoa
- Human rights in Samoa
  - LGBT rights in Samoa
  - Freedom of religion in Samoa
- Law enforcement in Samoa

=== Military of Samoa ===
Military of Samoa Samoa has no military.

=== Local government in Samoa ===
Local government in Samoa

The Fa'amatai system is Samoa's chiefly system of governance existing at the local village level.

== History of Samoa ==
History of Samoa

- Timeline of the history of Samoa
- Current events of Samoa
- Military history of Samoa

== Culture of Samoa ==
Culture of Samoa

- Architecture of Samoa
- Cuisine of Samoa
- Festivals in Samoa
- Languages of Samoa
- Media in Samoa
- National symbols of Samoa
  - Coat of arms of Samoa
  - Flag of Samoa
  - National anthem of Samoa
- People of Samoa
- Public holidays in Samoa
- Records of Samoa
- Religion in Samoa
  - Christianity in Samoa
  - Hinduism in Samoa
  - Islam in Samoa
  - Judaism in Samoa
  - Sikhism in Samoa
- World Heritage Sites in Samoa: None

=== Art in Samoa ===
- Art in Samoa
- Cinema of Samoa
- Literature of Samoa
- Music of Samoa
- Television in Samoa
- Theatre in Samoa

=== Sports in Samoa ===
Sports in Samoa

- Football in Samoa
- Samoa at the Olympics

== Economy and infrastructure of Samoa ==
Economy of Samoa

- Economic rank, by nominal GDP (2007): 180th (one hundred and eightieth)
- Agriculture in Samoa
- Banking in Samoa
  - National Bank of Samoa
- Communications in Samoa
  - Internet in Samoa
- Companies of Samoa
- Currency of Samoa: Tala
  - ISO 4217: WST
- Energy in Samoa
  - Energy policy of Samoa
  - Oil industry in Samoa
- Mining in Samoa
- Tourism in Samoa
- Transport in Samoa
- Samoa Stock Exchange

== Education in Samoa ==
Education in Samoa

== Infrastructure of Samoa ==
- Health care in Samoa
  - 2019 Samoa measles outbreak
- Transportation in Samoa
  - Airports in Samoa
  - Rail transport in Samoa
  - Roads in Samoa
- Water supply and sanitation in Samoa

== See also ==
Samoa

- Index of Samoa-related articles
- List of international rankings
- List of Samoa-related topics
- Member state of the Commonwealth of Nations
- Member state of the United Nations
- Outline of Oceania
