= Economy of Samoa =

Statistics
- GDP: ▲$1.16 billion (nominal; 2025); ▲$1.62 billion (PPP; 2025)
- GDP rank: 184th (nominal; 2025); 186th (PPP; 2025)
- GDP growth: ▲9.2% (2023); ▲9.4% (2024); ▲5.4% (2025); ▲2.6% (2026f)
- GDP per capita: ▲$5,470 (nominal; 2025); ▲$7,620 (PPP; 2025)
- GDP per capita rank: 113th (nominal; 2025); 138th (PPP; 2025)
- Inflation (CPI): 3.672% (2018)
- Labour force: ▼57,776 (2025); 41.6% employment rate (2022)

External
- Main export partners: Singapore 16.2%; New Zealand 14.9%; Indonesia 11.1%; Australia 10.6%; United States 8.31%; India 7.08% (2024)
- Main import partners: New Zealand 19%; Singapore 14.5%; China 14.5%; South Korea 9.45%; Australia 9.44%; United States 7.76%; Fiji 7.52% (2024)
- All values, unless otherwise stated, are in US dollars.

The economy of Samoa is dependent on agricultural exports, development aid, and private financing from overseas. The country is vulnerable to devastating storms, earthquakes, and tsunamis. Agriculture employs two-thirds of the labor force, and furnishes 9% of exports, featuring coconut cream, coconut oil and copra. Outside of a large automotive wire harness factory, the manufacturing sector mainly processes agricultural products. Tourism is an expanding sector; more than 70,000 tourists visited the islands in 1996 and 120,000 in 2014. The Samoan Government has called for deregulation of the financial sector, encouragement of investment, and continued fiscal discipline. Observers point to the flexibility of the labor market as a basic strength factor for future economic advances.

== Sectors ==
=== Agriculture ===
Samoa produced in 2018:

- 180 thousand tons of coconut;
- 25 thousand tons of taro;
- 22 thousand tons of banana;
- 6.6 thousand tons of yam;
- 4.6 thousand tons of pineapple;
- 4.1 thousand tons of mango (including mangosteen and guava);
- 3.4 thousand tons of papaya;

In addition to smaller productions of other agricultural products.

Cocoa production in Samoa is comparatively small but significant among the country's subsistence farmers.

=== Manufacturing ===
Until 2017 industry accounted for over one-quarter of GDP while employing less than 6% of the work force. The largest industrial venture was Yazaki Samoa, a Japanese-owned company processing automotive wire harnesses for export to Australia under a concessional market-access arrangement. The Yazaki plant employed more than 2,000 workers and made up over 20% of the manufacturing sector's total output. Net receipts amounted to between $1.5 million and $3.03 million annually, although shipments from Yazaki was counted as services (export processing) and therefore did not officially appear as merchandise exports. Yazaki Samoa closed down in 2017, but in the same year Fero, a New Zealand manufacturer producing wiring units, set up in Samoa in the same plant used by Yazaki.

=== Tourism ===
In 1972 more than 85,000 visitors arrived in Samoa, contributing over $12 million to the local economy. One-third came from American Samoa, 28% from New Zealand, and 11% from the United States. Arrivals increased in 2000, as visitors to the South Pacific avoided the political strife in Fiji by traveling to Samoa instead.

Tourism numbers and revenue more than doubled in the decade 2007–2016. Samoa received 122,000 visitors in 2007 and 145,176 visitors in 2016. About 46% came from New Zealand, 20% from Australia and 7% from the United States. Samoans living overseas accounted for about 33% of all tourist numbers.

Responding to the COVID-19 pandemic in 2020, Samoa banned all international flights, inbound and outbound.

The service sector accounts for more than half of GDP and employs approximately 30% of the labor force.

=== Transport ===
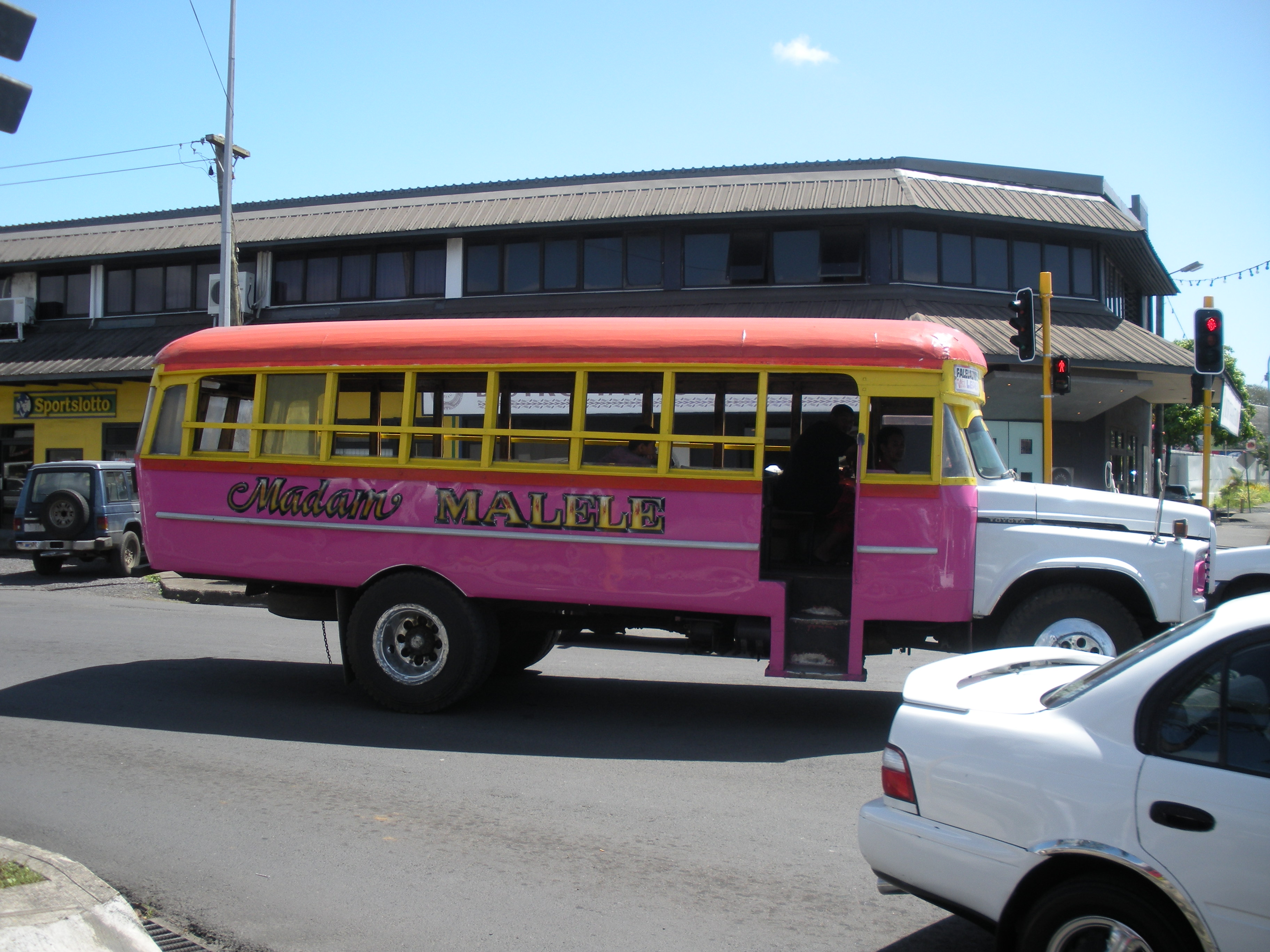
Local bus in the capital Apia.

Transport in Samoa includes one international airport situated on the north west coast of Upolu island, paved highways reaching most parts of the two main islands, one main port in the capital Apia and two ports servicing mainly inter island ferries for vehicles and passengers between the two main islands, Upolu and Savai'i.

=== Telecommunications ===
Telecommunications systems in Samoa include telephone, radio, television and internet.

In 2009, the Samoa-American Samoa (SAS) Cable provided inter-island communication, as well as enabling users in Samoa to access the ASH cable capacity and connect to the global networks. While ASH Cable and SAS Cable are much smaller than the huge systems across the North Pacific, they will provide more than 40 times the capacity currently in use in both island groups combined.

=== Healthcare ===
Expenditure on health in Samoa was 7.2% of GDP in 2014, US$418 per capita.

Life expectancy at birth was estimated at 72 years for men in 2016 and 78 for women.

Prevalence of obesity in the adult population, top countries (2016), Samoa has the sixth highest rate in the world.

The Human Rights Measurement Initiative finds that Samoa is fulfilling 75.5% of what it should be fulfilling for the right to health based on its level of income. When looking at the right to health with respect to children, Samoa achieves 98.7% of what is expected based on its current income. In regards to the right to health amongst the adult population, the country achieves 95.4% of what is expected based on the nation's level of income. Samoa falls into the "very bad" category when evaluating the right to reproductive health because the nation is fulfilling only 32.4% of what the nation is expected to achieve based on the resources (income) it has available.

== Non-conventional sources of revenue ==
Samoa annually receives important financial assistance from abroad. More than 100,000 Samoans who live overseas provide two sources of revenue. Their direct remittances have amounted to $12.1 million per year recently, and they account for more than half of all tourist visits. In addition to the expatriate community, Samoa also receives roughly $28 million annually in official development assistance from sources led by China, Japan, Australia, and New Zealand. These three sources of revenue—tourism, private transfers, and official transfers—allow Samoa to cover its persistently large trade deficit.

In the late 1960s, Potlatch Forests, Inc. (a US company), upgraded the harbour and airport at Asau on the northern coast of Savai'i and established a timber operation, Samoa Forest Products, for harvesting tropical hardwoods. Potlatch invested about US$2,500,000 in a state-of-the-art sawmill and another US$6,000,000 over several years to develop power, water, and haul roads for their facility. Asau, with the Potlatch sawmillers and Samoa Forest Products, was one of the busiest parts of Savai'i in the 1960s and 1970s; however, the departure of Potlatch and the scaling down of the sawmill has left Asau a ghost town in recent years.

== Trade ==
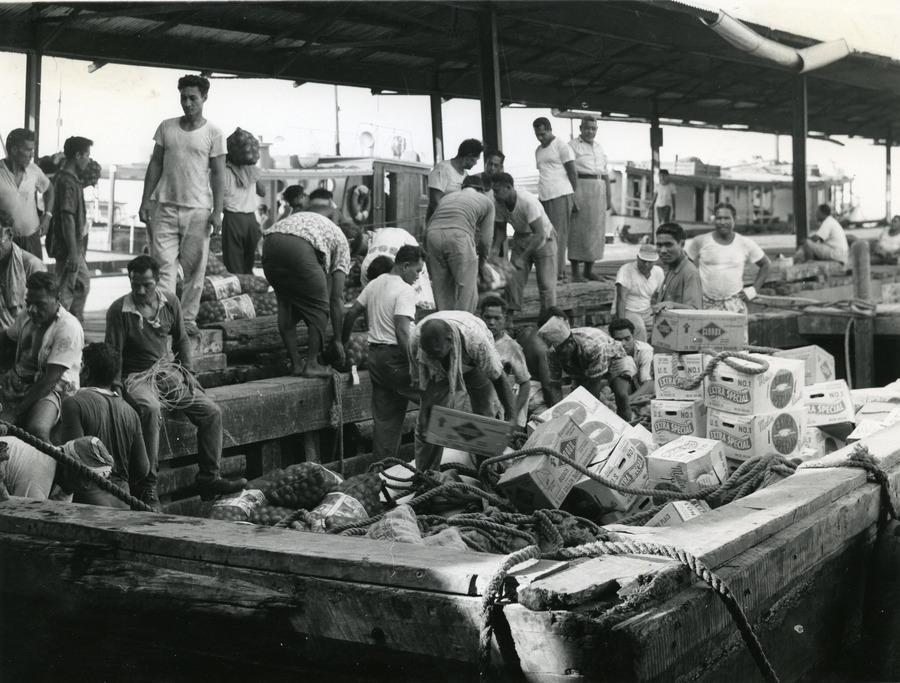
Unloading a lighter at Apia Wharf, around 1975–1985.

Exports of Samoa by product category (2019) Chemical products Transportation Machines Mineral products Plastics and rubbers Metals Foodstuffs Precious metals Textiles Instruments Animal products Vegetable products Paper goods Footwear and headwear Miscellaneous Stone and glass Wood products Animal and vegetable bi-products Animal hides Arts and antiques Weapons

The collapse of taro exports in 1994 has had the unintended effect of modestly diversifying Samoa's export products and markets. Prior to the taro leaf blight, Samoa's exports consisted of taro ($1.1 million), coconut cream ($540,000), and "other" ($350,000). Ninety percent of exports went to the Pacific region, and only 1% went to Europe. Forced to look for alternatives to taro, Samoa's exporters have dramatically increased the production of copra, coconut oil, and fish. These three products, which combined to produce export revenue of less than $100,000 in 1993, now account for over $3.8 million. There also has been a relative shift from Pacific markets to European ones, which now receive nearly 15% of Samoa's exports. Samoa's exports are still concentrated in coconut products ($2.36 million worth of copra, copra meal, coconut oil, and coconut cream) and fish ($1.51 million) but are at least somewhat more diverse than before.

In 2022, New Zealand was Samoa's principal trading partner, typically providing between 35% and 40% of imports and purchasing 45%–50% of exports. Australia, American Samoa, the United States, India, and Fiji are also important trading partners. Its main imports are food and beverages, industrial supplies, and fuels. The primary sector (agriculture, forestry, and fishing) employs nearly two-thirds of the labor force and produces 17% of GDP. Samoa's principal exports are refined petroleum, fish, and coconut products.

Fishing has had some success in Samoan waters, but the biggest fisheries industry (headed by Van Camp and StarKist) has been based in American Samoa. StarKist Management announced that it was going ahead with setting up at Asau a blast-freezer project to be operational by 2002. This announcement dispelled a growing suspicion about the genuine motives of StarKist to move to Samoa. The proposed blast-freezer operations in Asau were expected to bring this village back to life.

== Natural disasters ==
The effects of three natural disasters in the early 1990s were overcome by the middle of the decade, but economic growth cooled again with the regional economic downturn. Long-run development depends upon upgrading the tourist infrastructure, attracting foreign investment, and further diversification of the economy.

Two major cyclones hit Samoa at the beginning of the 1990s. Cyclone Ofa left an estimated 10,000 islanders homeless in February 1990; Cyclone Val caused 13 deaths and hundreds of millions of dollars in damage in December 1991. As a result, gross domestic product declined by nearly 50% from 1989 to 1991. These experiences and Samoa's position as a low-lying island state punctuate its concern about global climate change.

Further economic problems occurred in 1994 with an outbreak of taro leaf blight and the near collapse of the national airline Polynesian Airlines. Taro, a root crop, traditionally was Samoa's largest export, generating more than half of all export revenue in 1993. But a fungal blight decimated the plants, and in each year since 1994 taro exports have accounted for less than 1% of export revenue. Polynesian Airlines reached a financial crisis in 1994, which disrupted the tourist industry and eventually required a government bailout.

The government responded to these shocks with a major program of road building and post-cyclone infrastructure repair. Economic reforms were stepped up, including the liberalization of exchange controls. GDP growth rebounded to over 6% in both 1995 and 1996 before slowing again at the end of the decade.

== Statistics ==
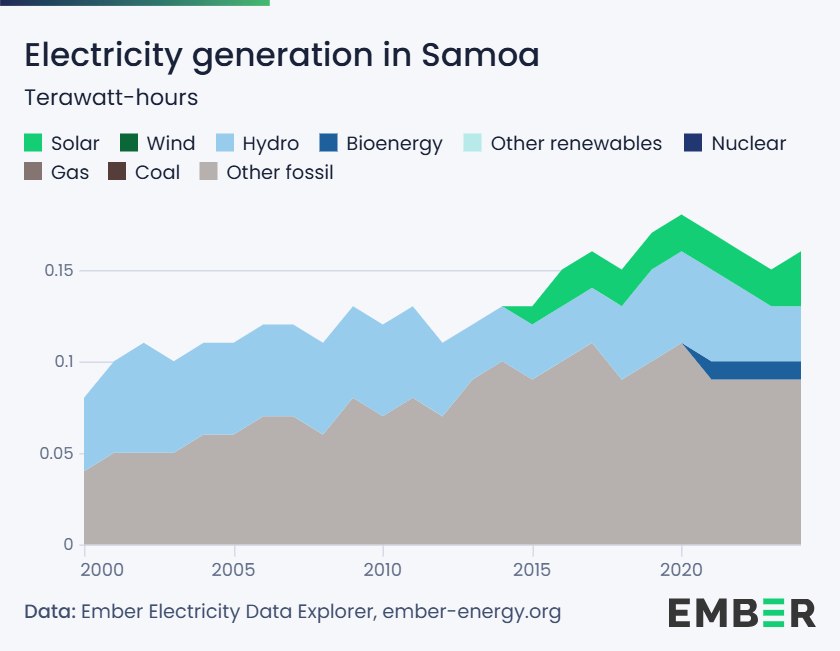
Electricity generation in Samoa in terawatt-hours

Gdp: purchasing power parity – US$1.137 billion (2017 est.)

GDP – real growth rate: 2.5% (2017 est.)

GDP – per capita: purchasing power parity – $5,700 (2017 est.)

GDP – composition by sector: (2017 est.)
agriculture: 10.4%
industry: 23.6%
services: 66%

Population below poverty line: NA%

Household income or consumption by percentage share:
lowest 10%: NA%
highest 10%: NA%

Inflation rate (consumer prices): 1.3% (2017 est.)

Labor force: 50,700 (2016 est.)

Labor force – by occupation:: (2015 est.)
agriculture: 65%
industry: 6%
services: 29%

Unemployment rate: 5.2% (2017 est.)

Ease of Doing Business Rank: 98th

Budget:
revenues: $110 million
expenditures: $122 million (2011–12)

Industries: tourism, food processing, auto parts, building materials

Industrial production growth rate: 5,3% (2010 est.)

Electricity – production: 200 GWh (2010)

Electricity – production by source:
fossil fuel: 60%
hydro: 40%
nuclear: 0%
other: 0% (2008)

Electricity – consumption: 150 GWh (2008)

Electricity – exports: 1 kWh (2008)

Electricity – imports: 0 kWh (2008)

Agriculture – products: coconuts, bananas, taro, yams, coffee, cocoa

Exports: $152 million (f.o.b., 2012)

Exports – commodities: coconut oil and cream, copra, fish, beer

Exports – partners: American Samoa, Australia, New Zealand, United States, Germany

Imports: $258 million (f.o.b., 2012)

Imports – commodities: machinery and equipment, foodstuffs

Imports – partners: Australia, New Zealand, Japan, Fiji, United States

Debt – external: $145 million (2010 est.)

Economic aid – recipient: $24.3 million (2010)

Currency: 1 tala (WS$) = 100 sene

Exchange rates: tala (WS$) per US$1 – 3.0460 (January 2000), 3.0120 (1999), 2.9429 (1998), 2.5562 (1997), 2.4618 (1996), 2.4722 (1995)

Fiscal year: calendar year
