= Emoji domain =

Internationalized domain name containing Punycoded emoji

An emoji domain is a domain name with one or more emoji in it, for example 😉.tld.

== Function ==
With the exception of three emoji (TM-™️, Information-ℹ️ and M-Ⓜ️), for an emoji to work reliably in a domain name, it must be converted into so-called "Punycode". Punycode is a character encoding method used for internationalized domain names (IDNs). This representation is used when registering domains containing special characters. The ASCII representation starts with the prefix "xn--" and is followed by the emoji-containing domain name encoded as Punycode; for example, "xn--i-7iq" is "i❤" when converted back to Unicode.

Each emoji has a unique Punycode representation. For example, "😉" in an IDN is represented as "xn--n28h". There are several generators on the Internet that allow one to convert emoji to Punycode and back.

== Availability and registration ==
As of April 2022, there are 11 top-level domains for which emoji domain registration is possible: .cf, .fm, .ga, .gq, .kz, .ml, .st, .tk, .to, .uz, and .ws; as well as 12 second-level domains: .radio.am, .radio.fm, .co.il, .org.il, .biz.ua, .co.ua, .pp.ua, .co.uz, .com.uz, .com.ws, .net.ws, and .org.ws.

The registration of an emoji domain can be more difficult than with normal domain names using only ASCII characters, since it is sometimes not possible to enter emoji into the online registration forms of domain name registrars, and instead the Punycode representation must be entered.

The availability of an emoji domain can be verified by using an emoji domain search engine or by checking the WHOIS data of the punycoded domain.

== History ==
At least four emoji domains were created on April 19, 2001: ☻.com (xn--84h.com), ♨️.com (xn--j6h.com), ♨️.net (xn--j6h.net), and ☮️.com (xn--v4h.com). In 2005, ♌.com (xn--q5h.com) was registered.

On 9 September 2003, https://I♥You.com (xn--iyou-5u3b.com), https://I♥.com (xn--i-n3p.com), I❤️You.com and over a thousand other emoji domains were registered by Menno de Ruiter for the first emoji project on the internet in conjunction with the two principal programmers for the Punycode/IDN project at VeriSign and Galcomm ICANN registrar in Israel.

Cabel Sasser of Panic created 💩.la (xn--ls8h.la), "The World's First Emoji Domain", on April 13, 2011. In February 2015, Coca-Cola used a domain name containing a smiley emoji in an advertising campaign aimed at mobile users in Puerto Rico. A 2018 survey of the .ws TLD recorded approximately 25,000 registered emoji domains.

On June 26, 2020, an online collective called It Is What It Is employed the 👁️👄👁️.fm (xn--mp8hai.fm) emoji domain to raise money for various social justice causes. The viral campaign, which relied on people's fear of missing out, caused thousands of Twitter users to post both the emoji domain and the phrase "It Is What It Is" in hopes of getting access to a rumored exclusive social network. In the end, It Is What It Is turned out to be a hoax designed to redirect attention to social issues; it ultimately raised over $200,000 and was featured in Wired, Forbes, Business Insider, The Verge, and Gizmodo, among other publications.

On August 8, 2023, Cloudflare announced support for emoji domains.

== Issues ==
Support among domain name registrars for emoji domains is limited.

It has been speculated that emoji domains, especially on mobile devices, may be used to lure victims into phishing scams.

Another problem is that emojis can look different depending on the operating system, applications, and fonts used. Not all browsers support emoji domains. On Google Chrome and Firefox, emojis display as Punycode in the address bar. However, in Safari, emoji are visible in the address bar. Emoji domains are also visible in Google and Bing search results.

There are also issues with using emoji domains in social media. While they are well supported on Twitter and LinkedIn, Facebook and Instagram have imposed serious restrictions. Similarly, support varies on messaging platforms.

As of now, only Punycode encoding is advised in e-mail addresses, e.g. "mail@xn--n28h.tld", as many Mail Transport Agents and Mail User Agents do not support SMTPUTF8 which would allow SMTP commands with non-ASCII characters. Currently, Gmail automatically converts emoji domains in e-mail addresses into punycode which allows sending emails to emoji domain addresses, while Outlook throws an error if the address is not written in punycode.

== Emoji subdomains ==
Emoji subdomains are like normal subdomains, except that they begin with emoji. Emoji subdomains are possible with many popular TLDs, including .com. As with any other emoji domain, emoji subdomains have to be converted into Punycode and can then be used as regular subdomains. Thus, domain combinations like 👍.example.org (xn--yp8h.example.org) are possible. This allows a wide scope of emoji domains outside of ccTLDs.
