= Foreign relations of Samoa =

The Samoan Government is generally conservative and pro-Western, with a strong interest in regional political and economic issues. Samoa participated in a first round of negotiations with its Pacific Island neighbors for a regional trade agreement in August 2000. In January 2009, Samoa opened embassies in the Republic of Korea, China and Japan.

== Diplomatic relations ==
List of countries which Samoa maintains diplomatic relations with:

#	Country	Date
1	New Zealand	1 January 1962
2	India	June 1970
3	United Kingdom	September 1970
4	Australia	31 March 1971
5	Canada	11 June 1971
6	United States	14 July 1971
7	France	16 July 1971
8	Germany	18 May 1972
9	Israel	30 May 1972
10	South Korea	15 September 1972
11	Japan	27 March 1973
12	Belgium	May 1973
13	Fiji	10 November 1974
14	China	6 November 1975
15	Netherlands	13 April 1976
16	Russia	2 July 1976
17	Philippines	1 June 1977
18	Sweden	1977
—	North Korea (suspended)	28 June 1978
19	Solomon Islands	17 July 1978
20	Chile	24 August 1978
21	Egypt	8 September 1978
22	Thailand	15 November 1978
23	Turkey	12 April 1979
24	Papua New Guinea	27 August 1979
25	Nauru	1979
26	Indonesia	17 March 1980
27	Vanuatu	30 July 1980
28	Spain	5 November 1980
29	Greece	3 April 1981
30	Switzerland	1 August 1981
31	Malaysia	August 1982
32	Pakistan	7 March 1983
33	Bangladesh	21 December 1983
34	Peru	23 January 1984
35	Italy	25 May 1987
36	Colombia	1 December 1987
37	Tuvalu	1988
38	Federated States of Micronesia	19 April 1990
39	Singapore	3 September 1990
40	Marshall Islands	22 October 1990
41	Austria	18 December 1992
42	Argentina	18 May 1993
43	Maldives	2 August 1993
44	Croatia	8 March 1994
45	Vietnam	9 March 1994
—	Holy See	10 June 1994
46	Kyrgyzstan	14 February 1995
47	South Africa	22 March 1995
48	Portugal	9 June 1995
49	Czech Republic	12 December 1995
50	Slovenia	25 November 1997
51	Finland	11 August 1999
52	Slovakia	16 March 2000
53	Cyprus	24 May 2000
54	Ireland	26 June 2000
55	Seychelles	29 August 2000
56	Malta	22 July 2004
57	Timor-Leste	27 July 2004
58	Iceland	15 October 2004
59	Brazil	1 February 2005
60	North Macedonia	18 August 2005
61	Brunei	8 February 2006
62	Romania	2 March 2006
63	Guatemala	20 September 2007
64	Cuba	11 October 2007
65	Albania	1 August 2008
66	Mexico	21 October 2008
67	Estonia	23 January 2009
68	Lithuania	19 February 2009
69	Bosnia and Herzegovina	13 March 2009
70	Luxembourg	2 June 2009
71	Georgia	12 March 2010
72	Botswana	18 March 2010
73	Monaco	4 May 2010
74	United Arab Emirates	11 May 2010
75	Cambodia	18 May 2010
76	Montenegro	28 January 2011
77	Morocco	28 January 2011
78	Paraguay	28 January 2011
79	Qatar	9 March 2011
80	Hungary	7 September 2011
81	Ecuador	20 December 2011
82	Mongolia	21 December 2011
83	Poland	8 March 2012
84	Moldova	14 June 2012
85	Latvia	28 June 2012
86	Suriname	16 November 2012
87	Kazakhstan	7 February 2013
88	Uruguay	21 March 2013
89	Nepal	28 March 2013
—	Cook Islands	30 August 2013
90	Ukraine	23 September 2013
91	Sri Lanka	15 August 2014
—	Kosovo	9 March 2017
92	Tajikistan	22 December 2017
93	Azerbaijan	19 January 2018
94	El Salvador	13 April 2018
95	San Marino	28 February 2019
96	Norway	8 March 2019
97	Ghana	20 December 2019
98	Dominican Republic	23 September 2021
99	Jamaica	26 April 2022
100	Bahrain	27 April 2023
101	Bulgaria	8 May 2023
102	Cape Verde	9 May 2023
103	Saint Lucia	14 December 2023
104	Saudi Arabia	23 May 2024
105	Bahamas	22 October 2024
106	Rwanda	23 October 2024
107	Belize	25 February 2025
108	Uganda	7 March 2025
109	Armenia	5 March 2026
110	Benin	8 May 2026
111	Trinidad and Tobago	25 August 2026
112	Kiribati	Established, date unknown
—	Niue	Established, date unknown
113	Tonga	Established, date unknown

== Bilateral relations ==
Country	Notes
Australia	Australia has a High Commission in Apia.; Samoa has a High Commission in Canberra and a consulate-general in Sydney.
Canada	Canada is accredited to Samoa from its high commission in Wellington, New Zealand.; Samoa is accredited to Canada from its mission in New York City.
China	See China–Samoa relations The Independent State of Samoa and the People's Republic of China (PRC) established official diplomatic relations in 1976. The two countries currently maintain cordial relations; China provides economic aid to Samoa.: China has an embassy in Apia.; Samoa has an embassy in Beijing and has an honorary consulate in Hong Kong.
Cuba	Samoa participated in the first Cuba-Pacific Islands ministerial meeting in Havana in September 2008, aimed at "strengthening cooperation" between Cuba and Samoa, notably in coping with the impact of climate change.: Cuba is accredited to Samoa from its embassy in Suva, Fiji.; Samoa does not have an accreditation to Cuba.
France	The Samoan Government was an outspoken critic of the French decision to resume nuclear weapons testing in the South Pacific Ocean in 1995. An indefinite ban was placed on visits to Samoa by French warships and aircraft. Large-scale street demonstrations were held in Apia. The French tests concluded in early 1996.: France has an embassy in Apia.; Samoa is accredited to France from its embassy in Brussels, Belgium.
Germany	Main article: Germany–Samoa relations: Germany is accredited to Samoa from its embassy in Wellington, New Zealand and maintains an honorary consulate in Apia.; Samoa is accredited to Germany from its embassy in Brussels, Belgium and maintains an honorary consulate in Berlin.
India	See India–Samoa relations
Japan	Diplomatic relations between Japan and Samoa were established in 1973. Ministerial level visits are frequent between the two countries. Emperor Akihito and Empress Michiko made a state visit to Samoa in 2003 when the Emperor was still Crown Prince. Japan opened an embassy in Apia on 1 January 2013.: Japan has an embassy in Apia.; Samoa has an embassy in Tokyo.
Kosovo	In September 2008, Samoa became the 46th country to officially recognise the independence of Kosovo.
Mexico	Mexico is accredited to Samoa from its embassy in Wellington, New Zealand and maintains an honorary consulate in Apia.; Samoa does not have an accreditation to Mexico.
New Zealand	See New Zealand–Samoa relations At independence in 1962, Samoa signed a Treaty of Friendship with New Zealand. This treaty confirms the special relationship between the two countries and provides a framework for their interaction. Under the terms of the treaty, Samoa can request that New Zealand act as a channel of communication to governments and international organizations outside the immediate area of the Pacific islands. Samoa can also request defense assistance which New Zealand is required to consider, as Samoa does not maintain a formal military. Overall, Samoa has strong links with New Zealand, where many Samoans now live and many others were educated. New Zealand is the closest stopping ground for travel to Samoa.: New Zealand has a high commission in Apia.; Samoa has a high commission in Wellington and a consulate-general in Auckland.
South Korea	The Independent State of Samoa and the Republic of Korea have established diplomatic relations on 15 September 1972.: Samoa and South Korea have good diplomatic relations.
Tonga	See Samoa–Tonga relations Both nations are Pacific Islands countries and members of the Commonwealth of Nations and Pacific Islands Forum.: Samoa is accredited to Tonga from its Ministry of Foreign Affairs in Apia.; Tonga is accredited to Samoa from its Ministry of Foreign Affairs in Nukuʻalofa.
Turkey	See Samoa–Turkey relations: Turkish ambassador in Wellington to New Zealand is also accredited to Samoa.; Trade volume between the two countries was negligible in 2019.
United Kingdom	See Samoa–United Kingdom relations Samoan Prime Minister Fiamē Naomi Mataʻafa with British Prime Minister Keir Starmer at a Commonwealth summit in Apia, October 2024. Samoa established diplomatic relations with the United Kingdom in September 1970.: Samoa is not accredited to the UK through an embassy; Samoa develops relations through its embassy in Brussels, Belgium.; The United Kingdom is accredited to Samoa through its high commission in Apia.; Both countries share common membership of the Commonwealth, the International Criminal Court, the United Nations, the World Health Organization, and the World Trade Organization, as well as the Pacific States–United Kingdom Economic Partnership Agreement.
United States	See Samoa–United States relations The two countries share cordial relations. Since 1967, the United States has supported a substantial Peace Corps program in Samoa. Over 1,700 Peace Corps Volunteers have served in Samoa over that time, with 51 Volunteers currently in-country. Peace Corps programs emphasize village-based development and capacity building. Other forms of U.S. assistance to Samoa are limited. The U.S. Embassy, staffed by a single officer, is the smallest embassy in Samoa and one of the few one-officer U.S. embassies in the world.: Samoa is accredited to the United States from its mission in New York City and has a consulate-general in Pago Pago, American Samoa.; United States has an embassy in Apia.

== Samoa and the Commonwealth of Nations ==
Western Samoa joined the Commonwealth of Nations in 1970.

== Regional integration ==
Samoan Prime Minister Tuilaepa Sailele Malielegaoi has pushed through a variety of legislation to increase links between Samoa and the Pacific regional powers of Australia and New Zealand. Under his leadership the country switched to driving on the left, decided to shift westwards across the International Date Line and adopted daylight saving time, and proposed the introduction of a common Pacific currency.

In late 2011, Tuilaepa Sailele Malielegaoi initiated a meeting of Polynesian leaders which led, in November, to the formal launching of the Polynesian Leaders Group, a regional grouping intended to cooperate on a variety of issues including culture and language, education, responses to climate change, and trade and investment. The Group was in part a response to the Melanesian Spearhead Group.

== See also ==
- List of diplomatic missions in Samoa
- List of diplomatic missions of Samoa
- Samoan passport
- Visa policy of Samoa
- Visa requirements for Samoan citizens
- Kaimiloa, a ship of the Kingdom of Hawaii that attempted to establish relations between Hawaii and Samoa.
