= Minister of Foreign Affairs (Samoa) =

Head of the Samoan Ministry of Foreign Affairs

Minister of Foreign Affairs of the Independent State of Samoa
- Minisita o le Va i Fafo o le Malo Tuto‘atasi o Sāmoa
- Coat of arms of the Independent State of Samoa

- Flag of Samoa

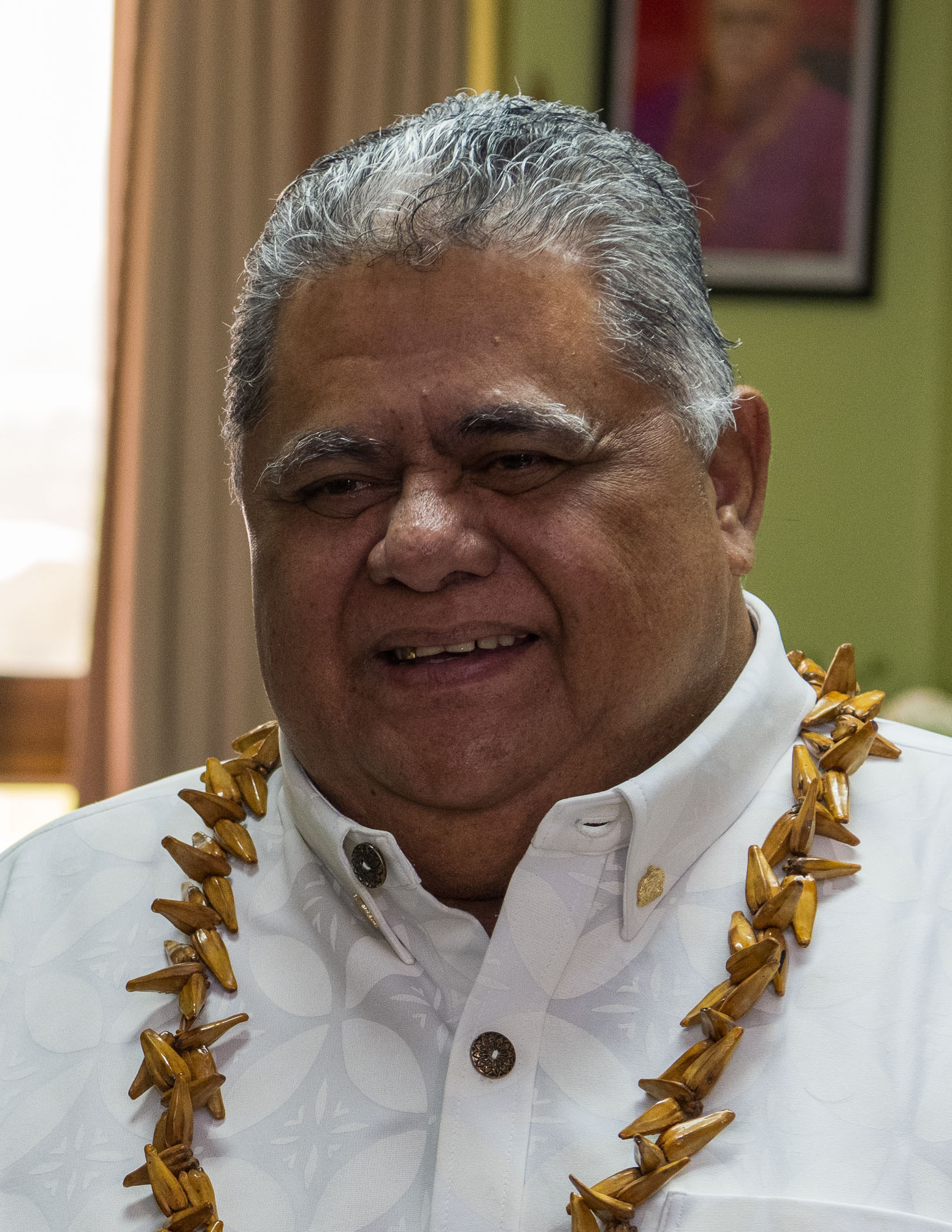
- Incumbent; Laʻauli Leuatea Schmidt since 16 September 2025
- Ministry of Foreign Affairs
- Status: Foreign minister
- Abbreviation: FM
- Member of: Cabinet of Samoa; Legislative Assembly of Samoa
- Seat: Apia
- Nominator: Prime Minister of Samoa
- Appointer: O le Ao o le Malo (Head of State)
- Term length: No term limit
- Constituting instrument: Constitution of Samoa
- Inaugural holder: Tui Ātua Tupua Tamasese Efi
- Formation: 24 March 1976

The Minister of Foreign Affairs of the Independent State of Samoa (Samoan: Minisita o le Va i Fafo o le Malo Tuto‘atasi o Sāmoa) is a cabinet minister in charge of the Ministry of Foreign Affairs of Samoa, responsible for conducting foreign relations of the country.

The incumbent Minister of Foreign Affairs is Laʻauli Leuatea Schmidt, who has served since 2025.

== Description of the office ==
Like other ministers, the Foreign Minister is formally appointed by the O le Ao o le Malo (Head of State) on the nomination of the Prime Minister, and is responsible to both the Prime Minister and the Legislative Assembly. The position may be held independently, or in conjunction with other ministerial responsibilities. From time to time, the Prime Minister has simultaneously served as Foreign Minister.

== List of ministers ==
Political parties

Human Rights Protection Party
Faʻatuatua i le Atua Samoa ua Tasi

Other factions

Independent

The following is a list of foreign ministers of Samoa since the establishment of the office in 1976:

| No. | Name (Birth–Death) | Portrait | Tenure |
|---|---|---|---|
| 1 | Tui Ātua Tupua Tamasese Efi (born 1938) | | 1976–1982 |
| 2 | Vaʻai Kolone (1911–2001) | | 1982 |
| (1) | Tui Ātua Tupua Tamasese Efi (born 1938) | | 1982 |
| 3 | Lauofo Meti (1929–2008) | | 1982–1984 |
| 4 | Tofilau Eti Alesana (1924–1999) | | 1984–1985 |
| (2) | Vaʻai Kolone (1911–2001) | | 1985–1988 |
| (4) | Tofilau Eti Alesana (1924–1999) | | 1988–1998 |
| 5 | Tuila'epa Sa'ilele Malielegaoi (born 1945) | | 1998–2021 |
| 6 | Fiamē Naomi Mataʻafa (born 1957) | | 2021–2025 |
| 7 | Laʻauli Leuatea Schmidt (born 1966) | | 2025–present |
