= SamoaNIC =

SamoaNIC is the official registrar for the .ws top-level domain, owned by Samoa (formerly Western Samoa).

== History ==
The .ws delegation was created on 14 July 1995 by Internet Assigned Numbers Authority (IANA) according to the country's preexisting ISO 3166-1 two letter country code.

The top level domain is sponsored by the Samoan Ministry of Foreign Affairs & Trade. SamoaNIC is run by Computer Services Ltd, based in Apia.

== Jurisdiction ==
Like all country code top level domains (ccTLDs), .ws does not fall under ICANN's remit; ICANN are only responsible for commercial and generic TLDs (com, net etc.)

== See also ==
- NameSilo
