= Samoa–Tonga relations =

Samoa-Tonga relations
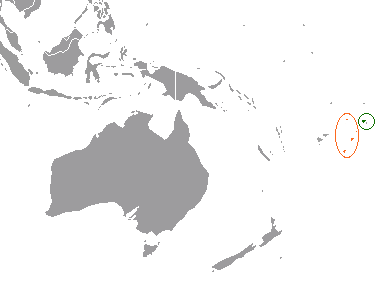

- Samoa: Tonga

Samoa–Tonga relations are the bilateral relations between the Independent State of Samoa and the Kingdom of Tonga. They also interact in multilateral relations, with both of them belonging to the United Nations, the Commonwealth of Nations, and the Pacific Islands Forum.

== Historical context ==
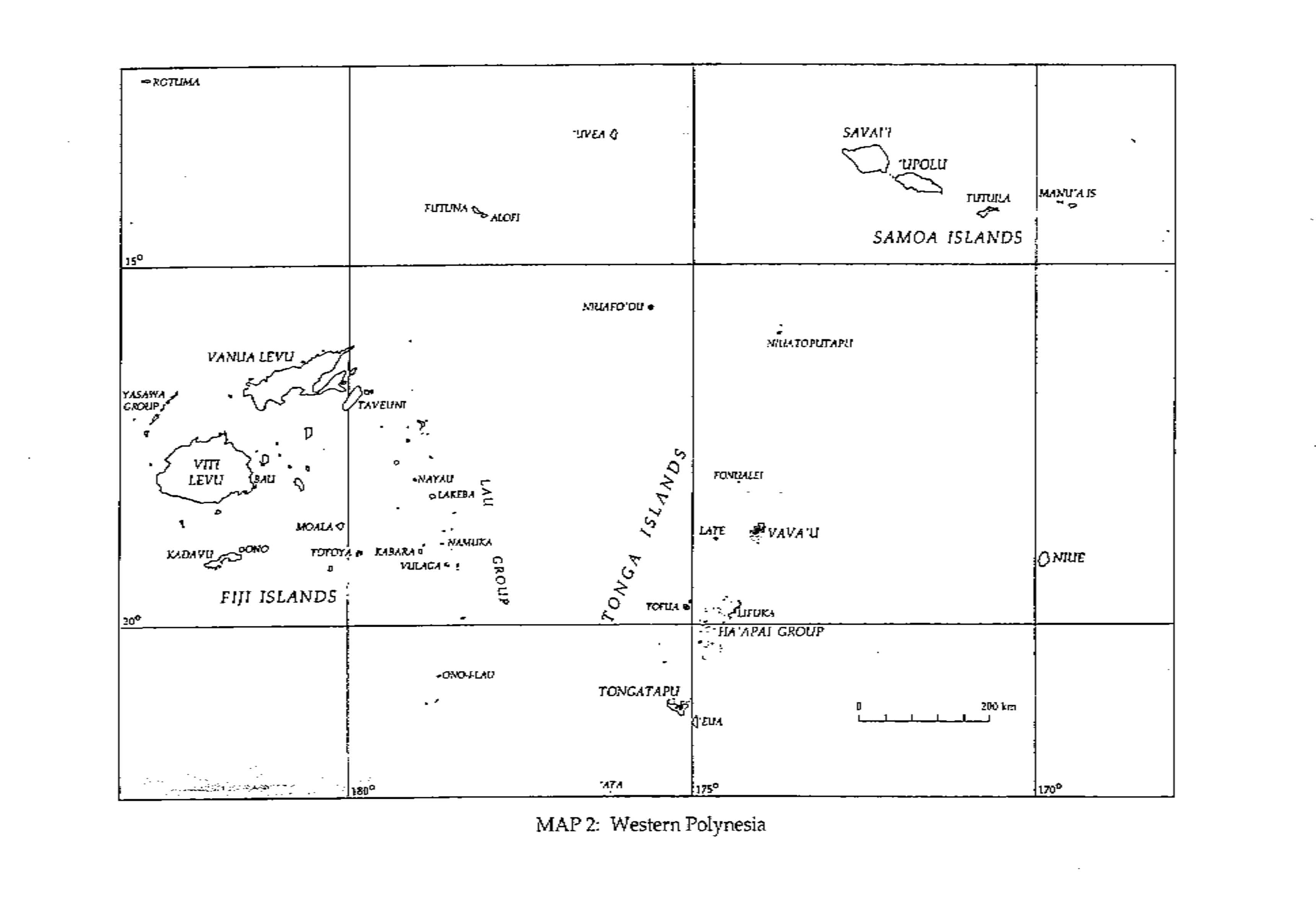
Map of Samoa, Tonga and Fiji.

According to Samoan oral tradition, Tonga was once under the dominion of the Tui Manu'a and paid tribute to the revered paramount chief. In the tenth century this dominance waned and eventually supplanted by the Tuʻi Tonga Empire. While Manu'a under the Tui Manu'a remained independent, the rest of Samoa paid tribute to the Tu'i Tonga. In the thirteenth century Talakaifaiki brought Samoa under his direct control, and established a capital at Safotu on the island of Savaiʻi. He was later driven out by the progenitors of the Malietoa dynasty. Despite this successful rebellion intermarriages between Tongan and Samoan chiefly lines continued, and Ngata, the progenitor of the current Tonga royal dynasty, the Tuʻi Kanokupolu, was of Samoan descent.

In the nineteenth century, European great powers fought over the division of the region, and Samoa was colonised by the Germans, which was then occupied by New Zealand during the First World War. Tonga was placed under British protection for 70 years.

== Modern relations ==
Tonga has no formally agreed maritime boundary with Samoa. Talks on the issue were supposed to be finalised in 2019.

In September 2017, acting Tongan Prime Minister ʻAkilisi Pōhiva visited Apia with a Tongan delegation for a Pacific Islands Forum meeting.

In November 2022, Samoa's O le Ao o le Malo Tuimalealiʻifano Vaʻaletoʻa Sualauvi II visited Nukuʻalofa in order to preside over a University of the South Pacific graduation ceremony in his role as USP chancellor. While there he paid a formal visit to Tongan Prime Minister Siaosi Sovaleni.

== See also ==
- Foreign relations of Samoa
- Foreign relations of Tonga
