= Samoa–Turkey relations =

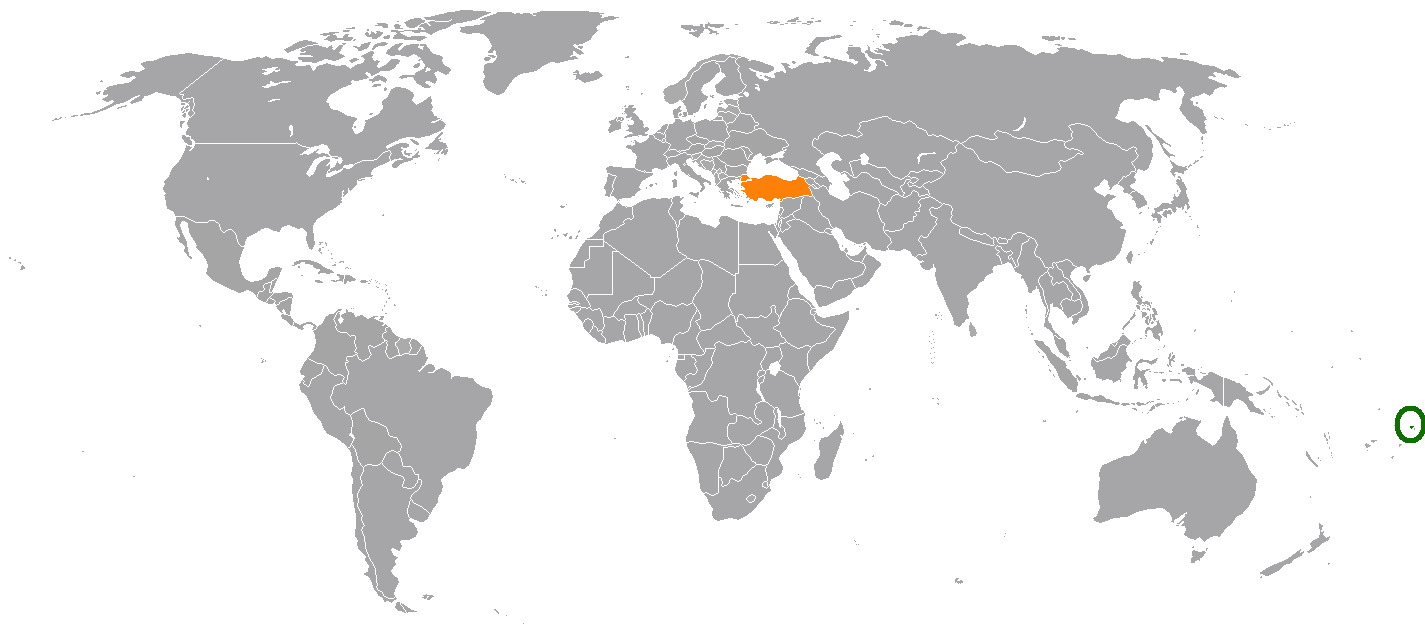

- Samoa: Turkey

Samoa–Turkey relations are foreign relations between Samoa and Turkey. The Turkish ambassador in Wellington, New Zealand, is accredited to Samoa since April 12, 1979.

== Diplomatic relations ==
Turkey and Samoa have friendly relations. Through TIKA, Turkey cooperates with the European Investment Bank and JICA on the development of school buildings, district hospitals and reductions of the financial burden on the Samoan Development Bank through loan forgiveness.

Turkey also contributes—US $60.5 million to date— to Samoa Development Bank's lending programs to farmers and fishermen at large.

== Diplomatic Visits ==
Guest	Host	Place of visit	Date of visit
(Samoa) Prime Minister Malielegaoi	(Turkey) President Recep Tayyip Erdoğan	World Humanitarian Summit, Istanbul	May 23–24, 2016

== Economic relations ==
Trade volume between the two countries was negligible US$1 million in 2019.

== See also ==
- Foreign relations of Samoa
- Foreign relations of Turkey
