= Samoa–United States relations =

- Samoa: United States

Bilateral relations between Samoa and the United States are considered cordial and warm.

== History ==
Since 1967, the United States has supported a substantial Peace Corps program in Samoa. Over 1,700 Peace Corps Volunteers have served in Samoa over that time, with 30 Volunteers currently in-country. The Peace Corps program emphasizes English literacy at the primary school level. Other forms of U.S. assistance to Samoa are limited. The U.S. Embassy, staffed by a single officer, is the smallest Embassy in Samoa and one of the few one-officer U.S. Embassies in the world.

The United States and Samoa signed the Shiprider Agreement on June 2, 2012, coinciding with the Samoan Golden Jubilee marking the country's 50th anniversary of independence. The bilateral agreement allows Samoan law enforcement personnel to enforce maritime law and fisheries regulations on board U.S. Coast Guard ships. The agreement applies to officers of the Samoan Ministry of Agriculture and Fisheries and uniformed personnel of the Samoan Ministry of Police and Prison and the United States Coast Guard. Former Prime Minister Tuilaepa Aiono Sailele Malielegaoi and United States Ambassador to Samoa David Huebner were the signatories of the agreement.

The current interim U.S. Ambassador to Samoa is Chargé d'Affaires Kevin Covert, accredited to both New Zealand and Samoa, who took over after the resignation of the Senate-confirmed Scott Brown. On July 16, 2021, US President Joe Biden nominated Udall to serve as United States Ambassador to Samoa and New Zealand; he has confirmed December 2, 2021.

== See also ==
- American Samoa, a territory within the Samoan Islands that is part of the United States
- Foreign relations of Samoa
- Foreign relations of the United States
- Politics of Samoa
- Samoan unification
