= Telecommunications in Samoa =

Telecommunications systems in Samoa include telephone, radio, television and internet.

In 2009, the Samoa-American Samoa (SAS) Cable provided inter-island communication, as well as enabling users in Samoa to access the ASH cable capacity and connect to the global networks. While ASH Cable and SAS Cable are much smaller than the huge systems across the North Pacific, they will provide more than 40 times the capacity currently in use in both island groups combined.

== Telephone ==
Main lines in use: 8,000 (2005)

Telephones - mobile cellular: >30,000 (2005)

Telephone system:
domestic: GSM mobile phone network covering 90% of the country (2006) and a landline system covering 65% of country.
international: satellite earth station - 1 Intelsat (Pacific Ocean)

== Radio ==
Broadcast stations: AM 1, FM 5, shortwave 0 (2005)

Radios: 90% of 23.098 households had at least one radio (2001 census)

== Television ==
Broadcast stations: 3 (in process of switching from PAL broadcast standard to NTSC) (2005)

Televisions: 15,603 (2001 census)

== Internet ==
Internet service providers (ISPs): 3 (2005)

Country code (Top level domain): .ws, .as
