= List of diplomatic missions of Samoa =

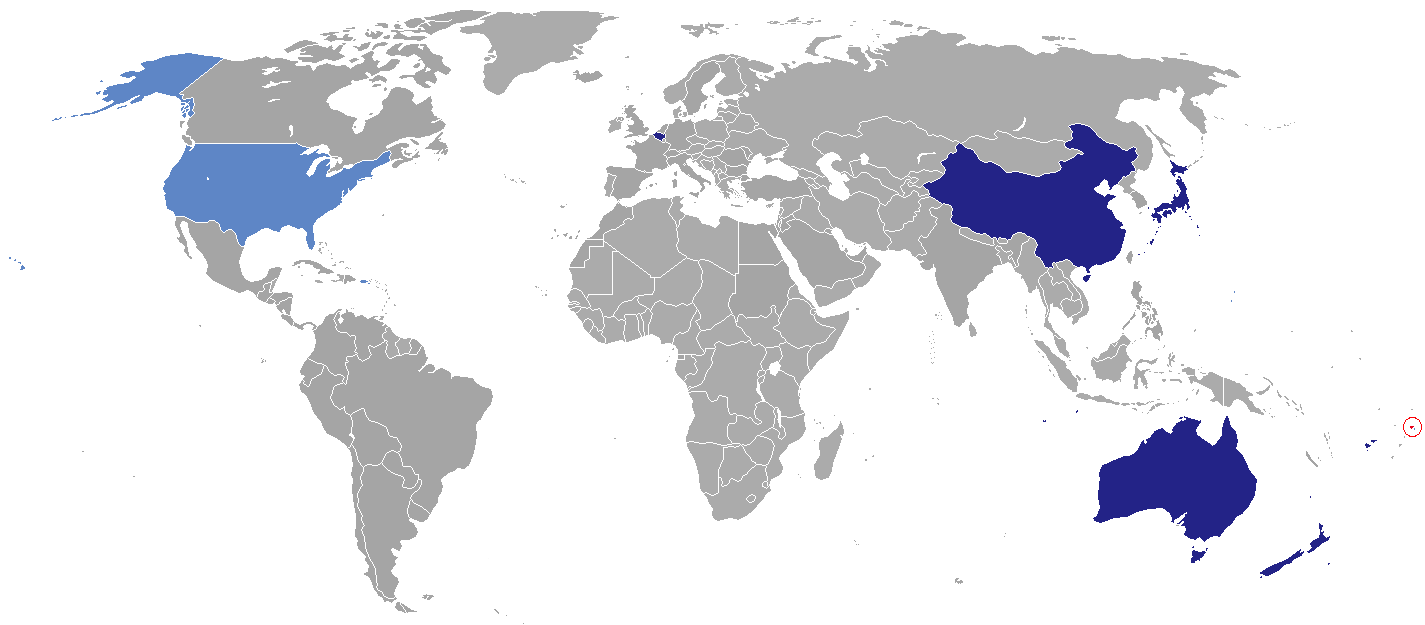
Map of Samoan diplomatic missions

This is a list of diplomatic missions of Samoa. The Pacific state of Samoa has a very limited number of diplomatic missions, complemented by several honorary consulates (not shown).

== Americas ==
Host country	Host city	Mission	Concurrent accreditation	Ref.
United States	Pago Pago, American Samoa	Consulate-General		

== Asia ==
Host country	Host city	Mission	Concurrent accreditation	Ref.
China	Beijing	Embassy		
Japan	Tokyo	Embassy	Countries: India; Philippines; Russia; United Arab Emirates; International Organizations: International Renewable Energy Agency	

== Europe ==
Host country	Host city	Mission	Concurrent accreditation	Ref.
Belgium	Brussels	Embassy	Countries: France; Germany; Hungary; Italy; Netherlands; Spain; Sweden; United Kingdom; International Organizations: European Union; Organisation of African, Caribbean and Pacific States; Organisation for the Prohibition of Chemical Weapons	

== Oceania ==
Host country	Host city	Mission	Concurrent accreditation	Ref.
Australia	Canberra	High Commission	Countries: Indonesia; Malaysia; Singapore; Timor-Leste; Thailand	
Australia	Sydney	Consulate-General	Countries: Indonesia; Malaysia; Singapore; Timor-Leste; Thailand	
Fiji	Suva	High Commission		
New Zealand	Wellington	High Commission		
New Zealand	Auckland	Consulate-General		

== Embassies to open ==
Host country	Host city	Mission	Ref.
Israel	Jerusalem	Embassy	

== Multilateral organisations ==
Organization	Host city	Host country	Mission	Concurrent accreditation	Ref.
United Nations	Geneva	Switzerland	Permanent Mission	Countries: Switzerland	
United Nations	New York City	United States	Permanent Mission	Countries: Brazil; Canada; Guatemala; United States	

== Gallery ==
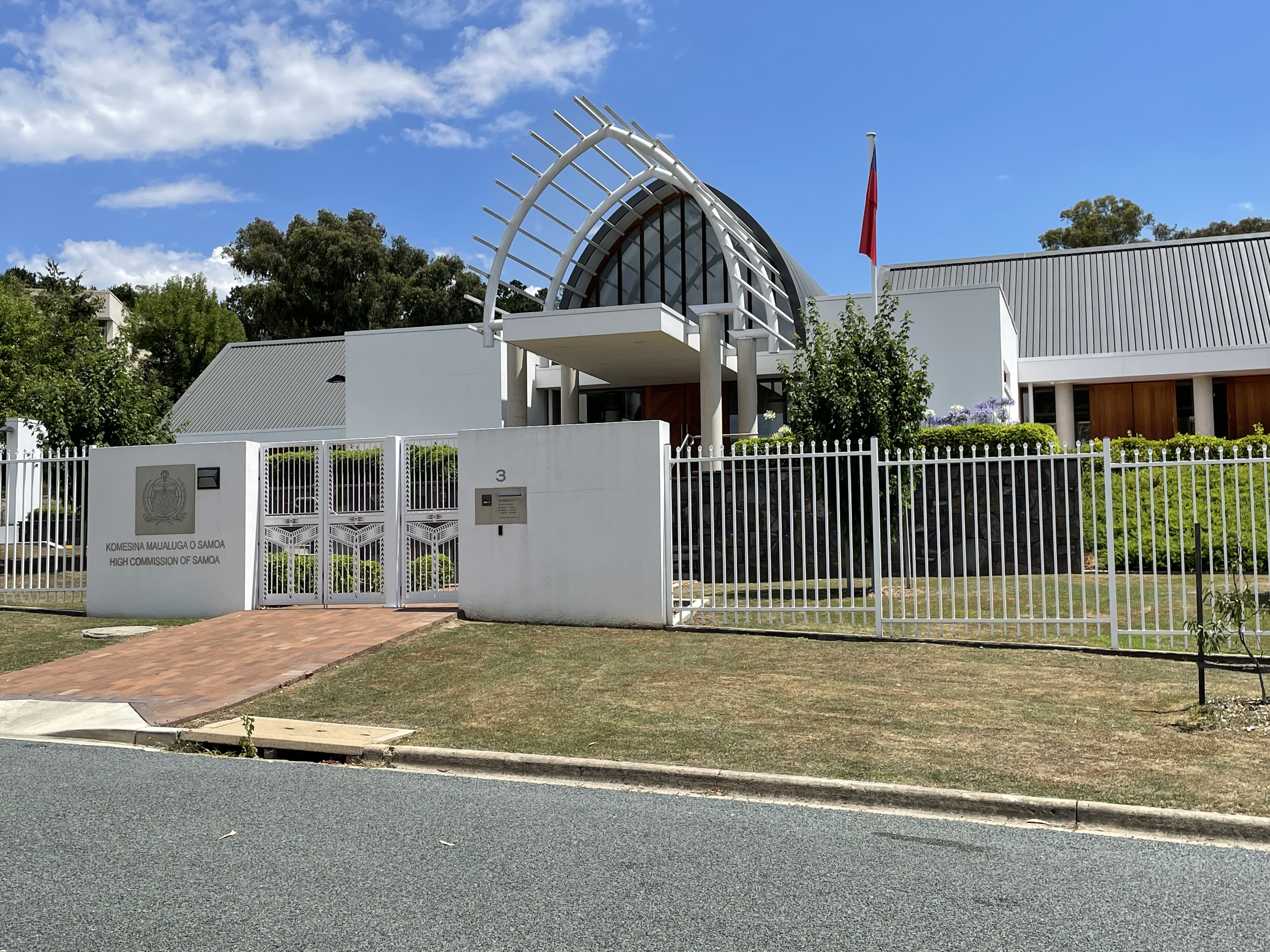
High Commission in Canberra

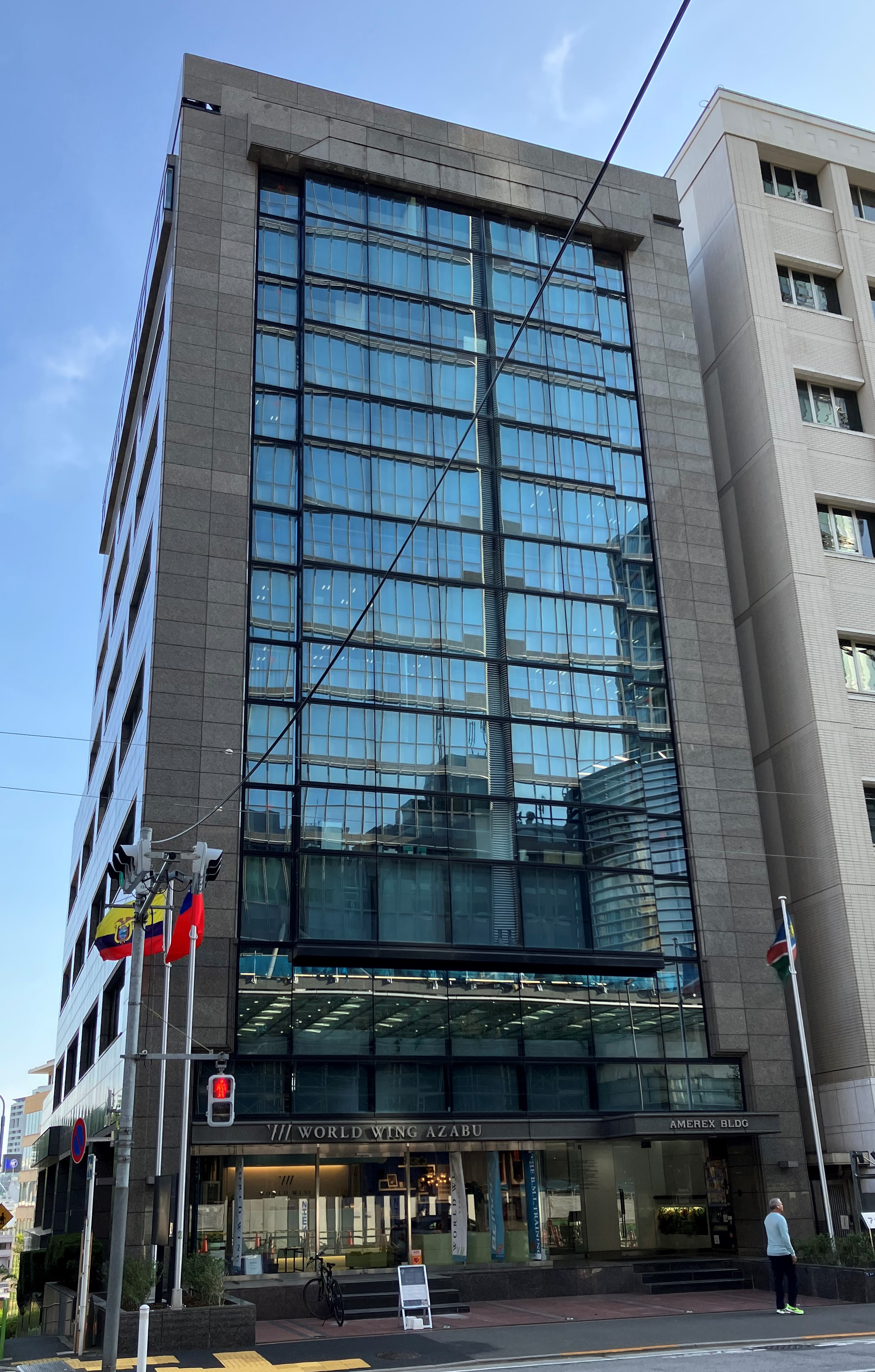
Building hosting the Embassy in Tokyo

== See also ==
- Foreign relations of Samoa
- List of diplomatic missions in Samoa
- Visa policy of Samoa
