= .gq =

Internet country code top-level domain for Equatorial Guinea

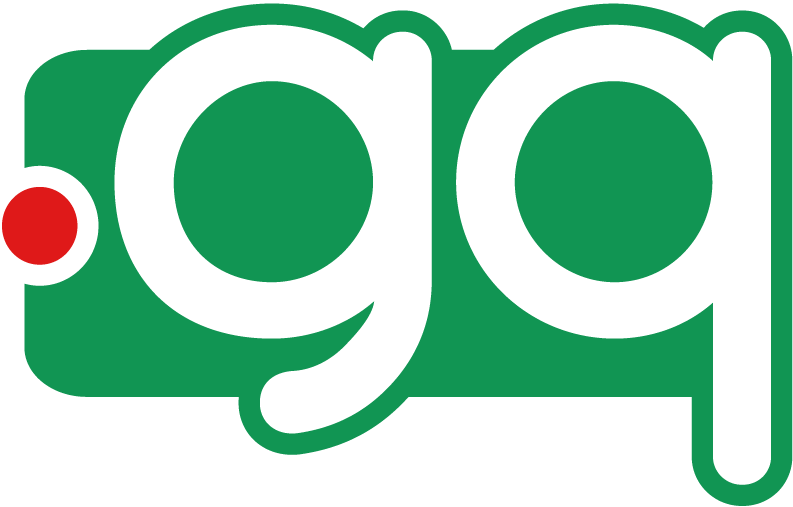
- Introduced: 10 July 1997
- TLD type: Country code top-level domain
- Status: Active
- Registry: GETESA
- Sponsor: GETESA
- Intended use: Entities connected with Equatorial Guinea
- Actual use: Sees relatively rare use, mostly not in Equatorial Guinea.
- Registration restrictions: Free domains available with some restrictions; paid registrations for legal ownership have no activity requirement
- Documents: Terms and conditions (free and paid domains)
- Dispute policies: UDRP (per Dominio GQ Domain Name Dispute Resolution Policy)
- Registry website: www.dominio.gq

.gq is the country code top-level domain (ccTLD) for Equatorial Guinea.

The .gq registry allows the creation of emoji domain names.

== History ==
The .gq domain was launched in July 1997 by GETESA, the nation's prominent internet service provider.

In October 2014, domain company Freenom partnered with GETESA to try a business model which involved giving away .gq domain names for free.

Before the public launch, there was a sunrise period to allow trademark holders to register their names. Public domain registration commenced on January 1, 2015.

Following Freenom's lawsuit with Meta and its settlement in 2024, the company exited the domain business on March of the same year. The registry is now operated by GETESA through the Dominio GQ platform at dominio.gq, deployed with the support of Freenom as technical partner. Any individual or legal entity can register a .gq domain, either for free subject to a content policy, or as a paid registration from CFA 5,000. In July 2026, the industry publication Domain Incite reported that Freenom had returned, again selling .gq domains (alongside .tk and .cf) from €8.22 per year, adding that reports that Equatorial Guinea had severed ties with Freenom did not appear to be the case.

== Abuse ==
Due to the lack of cost required to obtain a .gq domain, the TLD has been prone to usage for spam, phishing and other malicious purposes.

A study conducted by internet security company Symantec found that 92% of the top 50 .gq websites were being used for "shady" purposes.

Out of all of the websites on a .gq domain that were surveyed by Symantec, a whole 98.94% were being used for malicious purposes.
