= Samoa–United Kingdom relations =

- Samoa: United Kingdom

Diplomatic mission
- Embassy of Samoa, Brussels: High Commission of the United Kingdom, Apia

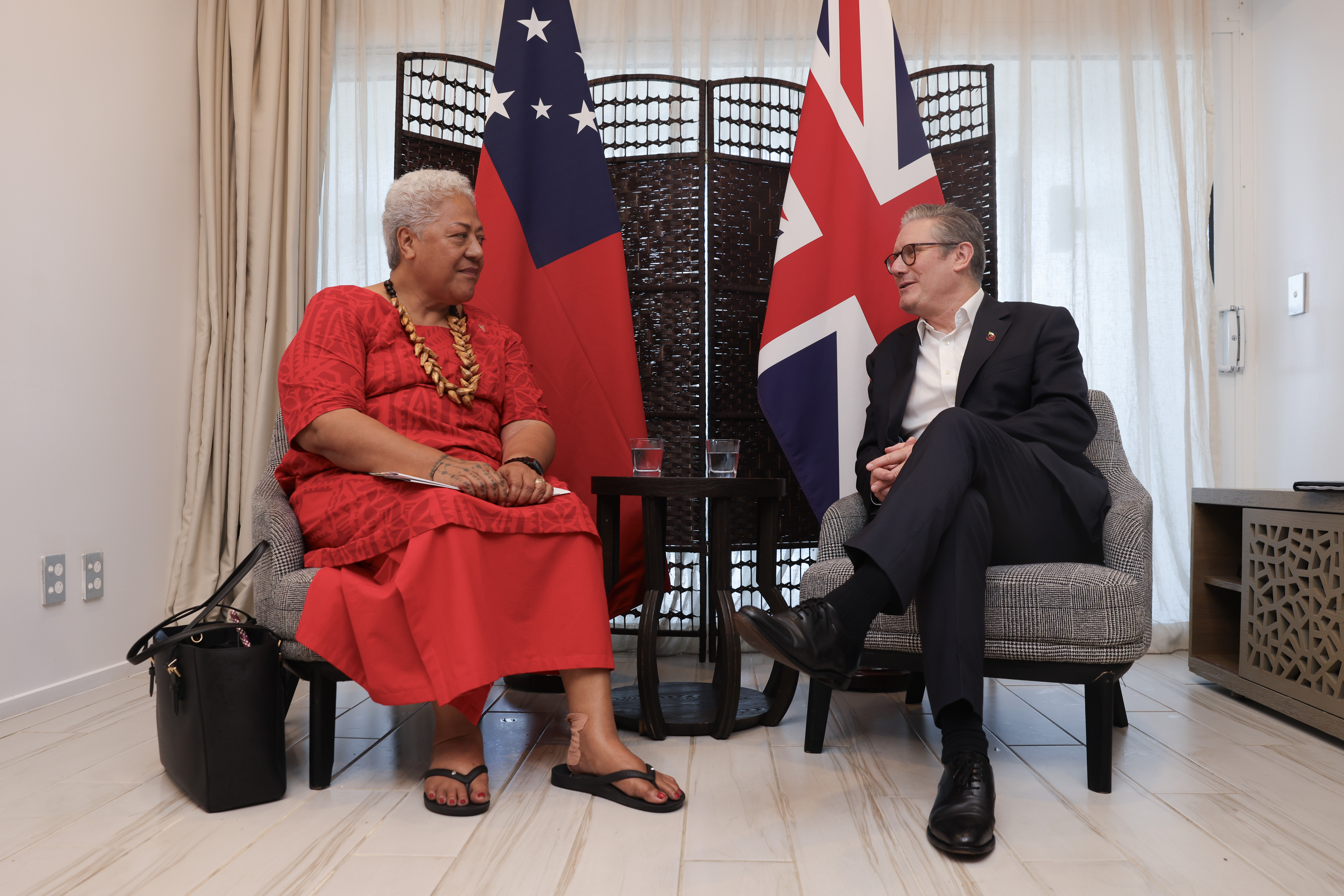
Samoan Prime Minister Fiamē Naomi Mataʻafa with British Prime Minister Keir Starmer at a Commonwealth summit in Apia, October 2024.

Samoa–United Kingdom relations encompass the diplomatic, economic, and historical interactions between the Independent State of Samoa and the United Kingdom of Great Britain and Northern Ireland. Following Samoa's independence, the two countries established diplomatic relations in September 1970.

Both countries share common membership of the Commonwealth, the International Criminal Court, the United Nations, the World Health Organization, and the World Trade Organization, as well as the Pacific States–United Kingdom Economic Partnership Agreement.

== History ==
On 24 October 2024, Starmer became the first incumbent British Prime Minister to visit Samoa for the 2024 Commonwealth Heads of Government Meeting.

== Economic relations ==
From 28 July 2014 until 30 December 2020, trade between Samoa and the UK was governed by the Pacific States–European Union Interim Partnership Agreement, while the United Kingdom was a member of the European Union.

Following the withdrawal of the United Kingdom from the European Union, the UK and the Pacific States (initially Fiji and Papua New Guinea) signed the Pacific States–United Kingdom Economic Partnership Agreement on 14 March 2019. The Pacific States–United Kingdom Economic Partnership Agreement is a continuity trade agreement, based on the EU free trade agreement, which entered into force on 1 January 2021. Samoa signed the agreement on 11 January 2021. Trade between Samoa and the United Kingdom became covered by the agreement from 31 March 2022, when the accession of Samoa entered into force. Trade value between the Pacific States and the United Kingdom was worth £286 million in 2022.

== Diplomatic missions ==
- Samoa is not accredited to the UK through an embassy; Samoa develops relations through its embassy in Brussels, Belgium.
- The United Kingdom is accredited to Samoa through its high commission in Apia.

== See also ==
- Foreign relations of Samoa
- Foreign relations of the United Kingdom
- Pacific States–United Kingdom Economic Partnership Agreement
- Samoan crisis
- Territory of Western Samoa
