= UZINFOCOM =

- Company type: Limited liability company
- Industry: IT
- Founded: July 30, 2002; 23 years ago
- Key people: Gimranov Emil Ildarovisch
- Divisions: Fergana and Khorazm
- Website: http://www.uzinfocom.uz/

UZINFOCOM is an integrator for creation and support of state information systems in the Republic of Uzbekistan. It was established in 2002, by Decree of the President of the Republic of Uzbekistan, the State Unitary Enterprise Center for the Development and Implementation of Computer and Information Technologies UZINFOCOM under the Uzbek Agency for Communications and Informatization (UzACI).

== History ==
- On October 18, 2002, UZINFOCOM signed an agreement with ICANN and became the administrator of the top-level domain ".uz";
- By the Decree of the President of the Republic of Uzbekistan No. PP-4321 dated May 18, 2019, the state share of UZINFOCOM was transferred to UMS.
- On August 29, 2019, was designated the single integrator for state information systems in the Republik of Uzbekistan and re-registered as an LLC for work on projects as public-private partners;
- In April 2022, a regional division of UZINFOCOM for the Xorazm Region was opened in Urgench;
- In May 2022, a regional division oz UZINFOCOM for the Fergana Region was opened in Fergana;

== Leadership ==
The Center's CEOs were:

- 2002-2005 – Xadjaev Alisher Djuraqulovich
- 2005-2013 – Rahimov Djalolatdin Kamiljanovich
- 2013-2015 – Djurayev Ibroxim Djurayevich
- 2015-2016 – Saidaliyev G‘ayratxo‘ja Gafarxo‘jayevich
- 2016-2017 – Isayev Xusan Nurullayevich
- 2017 – Muxitdinov Aziz Hakimovich (temporary acting director)
- 2018 – Tagaliyev Ulug‘bek Abdunabiyevich (temporary acting director)
- 2018 – Ugay Aleksandr Fedorovich
- 2018 – Po‘latov Farrux Jaxongirovich
- 2018 – Rahimov Djalolatdin Kamiljanovich
- from July 5, 2019, to present – Gimranov Emil Ildarovich

== Projects ==
The first websites of the main organizations of the Republic were written by UZINFOCOM specialists. In 2009, UZINFOCOM became the operator of the first data processing center (DPC) in the country (dc.uz). UZINFOCOM is the technical operator of Uzbekistan's national Data Processing Center (DPC) and operates the portal to interactive state services my.gov.uz (EPIGU), the virtual reception of the President (pm.gov.uz), and the portal of public opinion meningfikrim.uz. It is the administrator of the top-level domain .UZ. It operates educational portal ZiyoNet. It operates the portal of public opinion, the Electronic Parliament, and the online polyclinic.

In 2022, the UZINFOCOM team started developing an open source solution for the Xinux operating system based on the Linux kernel.

== International cooperation ==
On October 18, 2002, UZINFOCOM signed an agreement with ICANN and became a top-level domain administrator.

In June 2022, a Memorandum of Cooperation was signed with SE Infocom Kyrgyzstan.
