= List of diplomatic missions in Samoa =

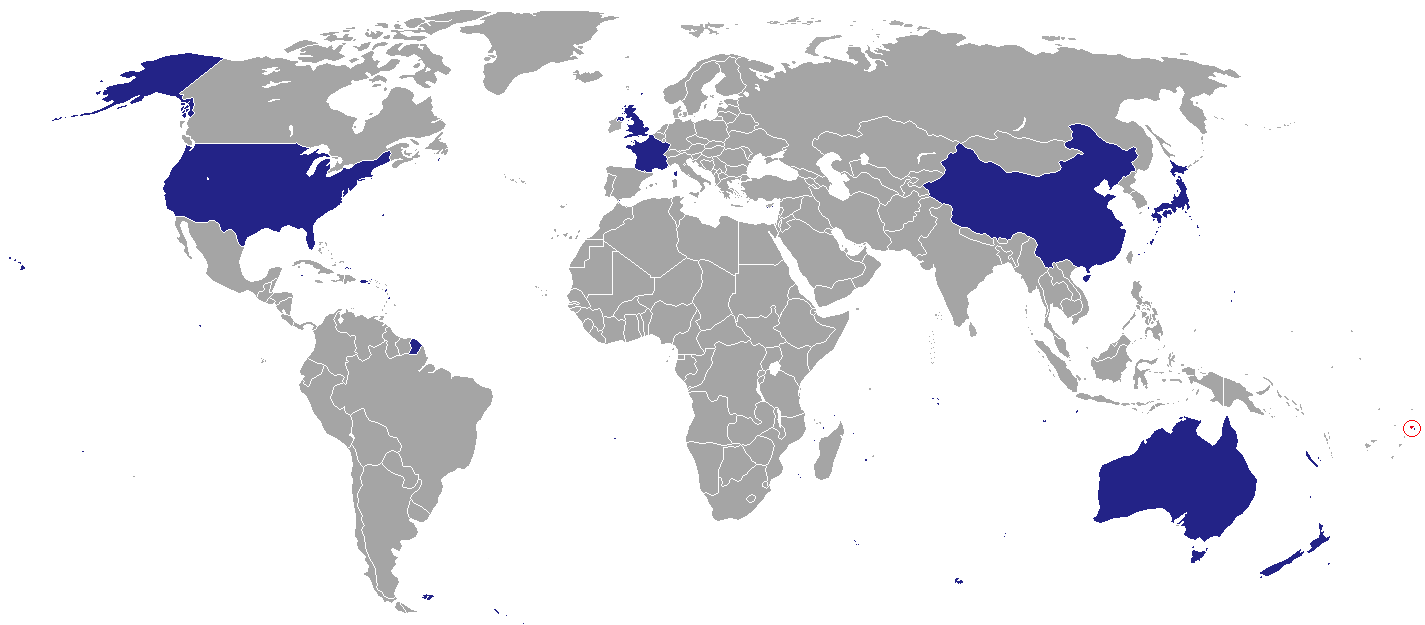
Diplomatic missions in Samoa

This is a list of diplomatic missions in Samoa. There are currently 7 diplomatic missions in Apia (not including honorary consulates).

== Embassies/High Commissions in Apia ==
1. Australia
2. China
3. France
4. Japan
5. New Zealand
6. United Kingdom
7. United States

== Non-Resident Embassies/High Commissions ==
Resident in Wellington, otherwise noted.

- Argentina
- Austria (Canberra)
- Brazil
- Canada
- Chile
- Colombia
- Cuba (Suva)
- Denmark (Canberra)
- Ghana (Canberra)
- Georgia (Canberra)
- Indonesia
- India
- Ireland
- Israel
- Kosovo (Canberra)
- Lesotho (Tokyo)
- Malawi (Tokyo)
- Malaysia
- Mexico
- Pakistan
- Philippines
- Russia
- Seychelles (New York City)
- South Korea
- Spain
- Switzerland
- Turkey
- Vietnam

== Non-resident Missions ==
- European Union (Suva)

== See also ==
- Foreign relations of Samoa
- List of diplomatic missions of Samoa
