= Visa requirements for Samoan citizens =

Samoan entry restrictions

Visa requirements for Samoa citizens are administrative entry restrictions by the authorities of other states placed on citizens of Samoa. As of 2026, Samoa citizens had visa-free or visa on arrival access to 129 countries and territories, ranking the Samoan passport 35th in terms of travel freedom according to the Henley Passport Index.

Samoa signed a mutual visa waiver agreement with Schengen Area countries on 28 May 2015.

== Visa requirements map ==
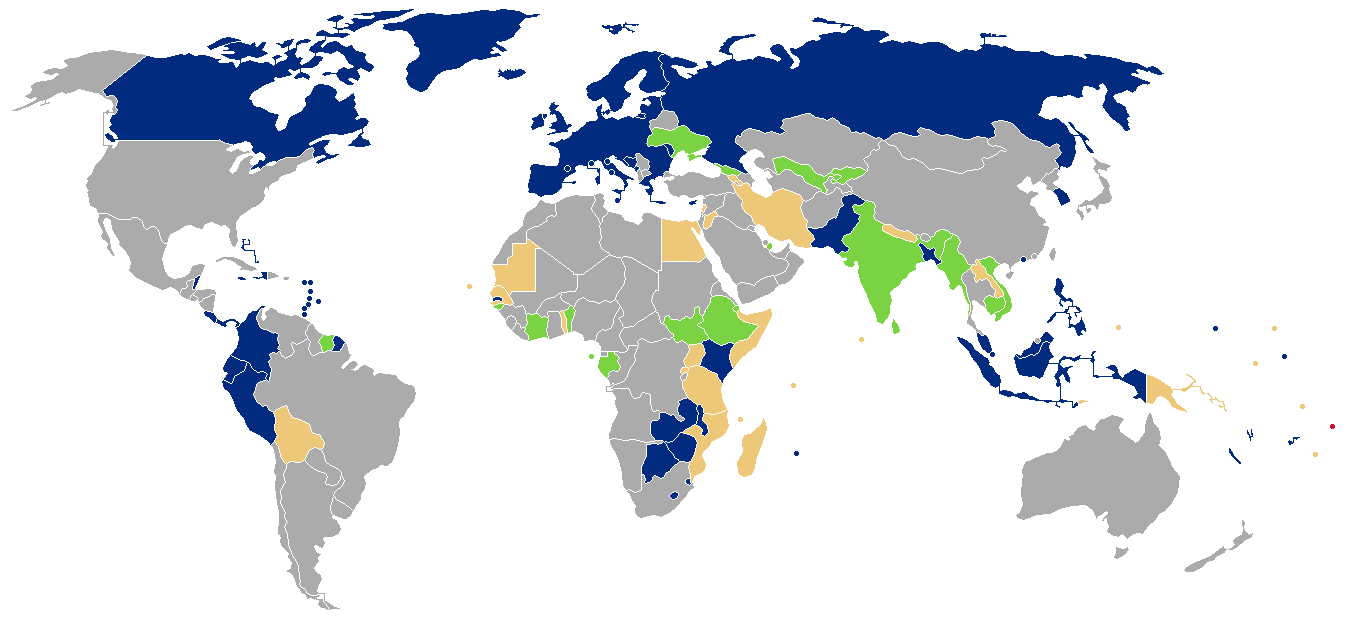
Visa requirements for Samoan citizens Samoa Visa-free Visa on arrival eVisa Visa required

== Visa requirements ==
| Country | Visa requirement | Allowed stay | Notes (excluding departure fees) |
|---|---|---|---|
| Afghanistan | eVisa | 30 days | Visa is not required in case born in Afghanistan or can proof that one of their parents is a national of Afghanistan or born in Afghanistan.; e-Visa : Visitors must arrive at Kabul International (KBL). |
| Albania | eVisa | | Visa is not required for Holders of a valid multiple-entry Schengen, UK or US visa has been previously used once or residence permit of Schengen, UK, US or UAE 10 years. |
| Algeria | Visa required | | |
| Andorra | Visa not required | | |
| Angola | eVisa | | |
| Antigua and Barbuda | Visa not required | 1 month | |
| Argentina | Visa required | | The AVE (High Speed Travel) is open to Samoan citizens holding valid, current ordinary passports traveling to Argentina for tourism. To do so, they must hold a valid category B2/J/B1/O/P (P1-P2-P3)/E/H-1B visa issued by the United States of America. |
| Armenia | eVisa | 120 days | |
| Australia and territories | Visa required | | May apply online (Online Visitor e600 visa).; Transit visa is not required. |
| Austria | Visa not required | 90 days | 90 days within any 180 day period in the Schengen Area |
| Azerbaijan | Visa required | | |
| Bahamas | Visa not required | 3 months | |
| Bahrain | eVisa | 14 days | |
| Bangladesh | Visa not required | | |
| Barbados | Visa not required | | |
| Belarus | Visa required | | Visa-free for 30 days for holders a Schengen visa or a national visa of country of EU, must arrive via Minsk International Airport. |
| Belgium | Visa not required | 90 days | 90 days within any 180 day period in the Schengen Area |
| Belize | Visa not required | | |
| Benin | eVisa | 30 days | Must have an international vaccination certificate. |
| Bhutan | eVisa | | Visa fee is 40 USD per person and visa application may be processed within 5 business days with duration of stay of 90 days.; e-Visa applicant is also subject to pay Sustainable Development Fee |
| Bolivia | eVisa / Visa on arrival | 90 days | |
| Bosnia and Herzegovina | Visa not required | 90 days | |
| Botswana | Visa not required | 3 months | |
| Brazil | Visa required | | |
| Brunei | Visa required | | |
| Bulgaria | Visa not required | 90 days | 90 days within any 180 day period |
| Burkina Faso | eVisa | | |
| Burundi | Visa on arrival | | |
| Cambodia | eVisa / Visa on arrival | | |
| Cameroon | eVisa | | |
| Canada | eTA / Visa not required | 6 months | eTA required if arriving by air. |
| Cape Verde | Visa on arrival | 30 days | Visa on arrival at Sal, Boa Vista, São Vicente or Santiago international airports.; Requirement to register online 5 days before arrival; Also pay the airport security fee of CVE 3400 either online or on arrival. |
| Central African Republic | Visa required | | |
| Chad | Visa required | | |
| Chile | eVisa | | |
| China | Visa not required | 30 days | The duration of stay in mainland China is 30 days at a time, and no more than 90 days within any 180-day period. |
| Colombia | Visa not required | 180 days | 90 days - extendable up to 180-days stay within a one-year period |
| Comoros | Visa on arrival | 45 days | |
| Republic of the Congo | Visa required | | |
| Democratic Republic of the Congo | eVisa | 90 days | |
| Costa Rica | Visa not required | 30 days | |
| Côte d'Ivoire | eVisa | | e-Visa holders must arrive via Port Bouet Airport. |
| Croatia | Visa not required | 90 days | 90 days within any 180 day period in the Schengen Area |
| Cuba | eVisa | 90 days | |
| Cyprus | Visa not required | 90 days | 90 days within any 180 day period |
| Czech Republic | Visa not required | 90 days | 90 days within any 180 day period in the Schengen Area |
| Denmark | Visa not required | 90 days | 90 days within any 180 day period in the Schengen Area |
| Djibouti | eVisa | 31 days | |
| Dominica | Visa not required | 6 months | |
| Dominican Republic | Visa required | | |
| Ecuador | Visa not required | 90 days | |
| Egypt | Visa on arrival | 30 days | Conditions apply. |
| El Salvador | eVisa | | |
| Equatorial Guinea | eVisa | | |
| Eritrea | Visa required | | |
| Estonia | Visa not required | 90 days | 90 days within any 180 day period in the Schengen Area |
| Eswatini | Visa not required | 30 days | |
| Ethiopia | eVisa | up to 90 days | eVisa holders must arrive via Addis Ababa Bole International Airport |
| Fiji | Visa not required | 4 months | |
| Finland | Visa not required | 90 days | 90 days within any 180 day period in the Schengen Area |
| France | Visa not required | 90 days | 90 days within any 180 day period in the Schengen Area |
| Gabon | eVisa | 90 days | |
| Gambia | Visa not required | 90 days | |
| Georgia | eVisa | | |
| Germany | Visa not required | 90 days | 90 days within any 180 day period in the Schengen Area |
| Ghana | Visa required | | |
| Greece | Visa not required | 90 days | 90 days within any 180 day period in the Schengen Area |
| Grenada | Visa not required | 3 months | |
| Guatemala | Visa required | | Visa is not required up to 90 days if holding a valid residence permit issued by Australia, Canada, GCC member state the United States the United Kingdom or a Schengen Area Member State. |
| Guinea | eVisa | | |
| Guinea-Bissau | Visa on arrival | 90 days | |
| Guyana | Visa required | | |
| Haiti | Visa not required | 90 days | |
| Honduras | Visa required | | |
| Hungary | Visa not required | 90 days | 90 days within any 180 day period in the Schengen Area |
| Iceland | Visa not required | 90 days | 90 days within any 180 day period in the Schengen Area |
| India | eVisa | 60 days | e-Visa holders must arrive via 32 designated airports (Note: Ahmedabad; Amritsar; Bagdogra; Bengaluru; Bhubaneswar; Chandigarh; Chennai; Coimbatore; Delhi; Gaya; Goa-Dabolim; Goa-Manohar; Guwahati; Hyderabad; Indore; Jaipur; Kannur; Kochi; Kolkata; Kozhikode; Lucknow; Madurai; Mangaluru; Mumbai; Nagpur; Port Blair; Pune; Surat; Thiruvananthapuram; Tiruchirappalli; Varanasi; Visakhapatnam) or 5 designated seaports. (Note: Chennai; Cochin; Mormugao; Mumbai; Mangalore); An Indian e-Tourist Visa may only be obtained twice within 1 calendar year.; Foreigners of Pakistani origin or who hold a Pakistani Passport are not eligible for an e-Visa. Foreigners who are not Pakistani nationals, but whose parents or grandparents (either paternal or maternal) were born in, or were permanent residents in Pakistan, are also not eligible for an e-Visa. |
| Indonesia | Visa required | | |
| Iran | eVisa / Visa on arrival | 30 days | Conditions apply. |
| Iraq | eVisa | 30 days | |
| Ireland | Visa not required | | |
| Israel | Electronic Travel Authorization | 90 days | |
| Italy | Visa not required | 90 days | 90 days within any 180 day period in the Schengen Area |
| Jamaica | Visa not required | | |
| Japan | Visa required | | Eligible for an e-Visa if residing in one these countries Australia, Brazil, Cambodia, Canada, India, Saudi Arabia, Singapore, South Africa, Taiwan, United Arab Emirates, United Kingdom, United States.; May apply online |
| Jordan | eVisa / Visa on arrival | 3 months | |
| Kazakhstan | eVisa | | |
| Kenya | Visa not required | 3 months | |
| Kiribati | Visa not required | 30 days | |
| North Korea | Visa required | | |
| South Korea | Visa not required | 30 days | |
| Kuwait | Visa required | | e-Visa can be obtained for holders of a Residence Permit issued by a GCC member state under the following conditions: To be 18 years old and over.; The residence permit for a GCC state must be valid for at least another 3 months.; To be accompanied by the sponsor of the residence permit if the sponsor is an individual.; Does not apply to holders of a GCC Student Visa and Non-Skilled Worker Visa |
| Kyrgyzstan | eVisa | | |
| Laos | eVisa / Visa on arrival | 30 days | 18 (Note: Savannakhet Airport; Lanetoui - Mengkang (China); Meuangmom - Wan Pong (Myanmar); Banvang - Ban Khok Phai (Thailand); Namngeun - Huay Kon (Thailand); Paksan - Bueng Kan (Thailand); Paktaphan - Pak Saeng (Thailand); Pangmon - Ban Huak (Thailand); Phoudou (Thailand); Dak ta ock - Nam Giang (Vietnam); La Lai (Vietnam); Namkan (Vietnam); Namphao - Cau Treo (Vietnam); Namsoy - Na Meo (Vietnam); Naphao - Cha Lo (Vietnam); Pahang - Long Sap (Vietnam); Panghok - Tây Trang (Vietnam); Phoukeua - Bo Y (Vietnam)) of the 33 border crossings are only open to regular visa holders.; e-Visa may be used to enter Laos through the Luang Prabang, Pakse and Vientiane international airports, 3 Thai-Lao Friendship Bridges (Note: Vientiane (Friendship Bridge 1); Savannakhet (Friendship Bridge 2); Bokeo (Friendship Bridge 4)), in Boten (road and railroad), and in Vientiane (at Khamsavath railway station).; Visa on arrival is available at the Luang Prabang, Pakse and Vientiane international airports, 4 Thai-Lao Friendship Bridges (Note: Vientiane (Friendship Bridge 1); Savannakhet (Friendship Bridge 2); Khammouane (Friendship Bridge 3); Bokeo (Friendship Bridge 4)) and 7 border crossings. (Note: Nongnokkheane - Trapeang Kriel (Cambodia); Boten - Bo han (China); Golden Triangle/Samliemkham (Thailand); Khamsavath railway station (Thailand); Namheuang - Ban Na Kraseng (Thailand); Vang tao - Chongmek (Thailand); Dansavan - Lao Bảo (Vietnam)) |
| Latvia | Visa not required | 90 days | 90 days within any 180 day period in the Schengen Area |
| Lebanon | Visa on arrival | 1 month | Extendable for 2 additional months; Granted free of charge at Beirut International Airport or any other port of entry if there is no Israeli visa or seal, holding a telephone number, an address in Lebanon, and a non refundable return or circle trip ticket. |
| Lesotho | Visa not required | 90 days | |
| Liberia | eVisa | | |
| Libya | eVisa | | |
| Liechtenstein | Visa not required | 90 days | 90 days within any 180 day period in the Schengen Area |
| Lithuania | Visa not required | 90 days | 90 days within any 180 day period in the Schengen Area |
| Luxembourg | Visa not required | 90 days | 90 days within any 180 day period in the Schengen Area |
| Madagascar | eVisa / Visa on arrival | 90 days | |
| Malawi | Visa not required | 90 days | |
| Malaysia | Visa not required | 30 days | |
| Maldives | Free Visa on arrival | 30 days | |
| Mali | Visa required | | |
| Malta | Visa not required | 90 days | 90 days within any 180 day period in the Schengen Area |
| Marshall Islands | Visa on arrival | | |
| Mauritania | eVisa | | |
| Mauritius | Visa not required | 90 days | |
| Mexico | Visa required | | Visa is not required for Holders of a valid visa of Canada, US, UK or a Schengen State and Permanent residence of Canada, Chile, Colombia, Schengen State, Japan, UK, US; Entry may be refused by immigration officials for individuals who were previously denied a US visa, even if holding a valid Mexican visa. |
| Micronesia | Visa not required | 30 days | |
| Moldova | Visa not required | 90 days | 90 days within any 180 day period |
| Monaco | Visa not required | | |
| Mongolia | eVisa | 30 days | |
| Montenegro | Visa not required | 90 days | |
| Morocco | Visa required | | May apply for an e-Visa if holding a valid visa or a residency document issued by one of the following countries: Schengen Area, Australia, Canada, Ireland, New Zealand, United Kingdom, United States a residency document issued by Cyprus, Japan, United Arab Emirates. |
| Mozambique | eVisa / Visa on arrival | 30 days | |
| Myanmar | eVisa | 28 days | e-Visa holders must arrive via Yangon, Nay Pyi Taw or Mandalay airports or via land border crossings with Thailand — Tachileik, Myawaddy and Kawthaung or India — Rih Khaw Dar and Tamu.; e-Visa available for both tourism (allowed stay is 28 days) or business (allowed stay is 70 days) purposes. |
| Namibia | eVisa | | |
| Nauru | Visa on arrival | 90 days | |
| Nepal | eVisa / Visa on arrival | 90 days | |
| Netherlands | Visa not required | 90 days | 90 days within any 180 day period in the Schengen Area |
| New Zealand | Visa required | | International Visitor Conservation and Tourism Levy not required.; May transit without visa if transit is through Auckland Airport and for no longer than 24 hours, subject to meeting character requirements and obtaining an Electronic Travel Authority prior to departure.; Holders of an Australian Permanent Resident Visa or Resident Return Visa may be granted a New Zealand Resident Visa on arrival permitting indefinite stay (pursuant to the Trans-Tasman Travel Arrangement), subject to meeting character requirements and obtaining an Electronic Travel Authority prior to departure. |
| Nicaragua | Visa on arrival | 90 days | |
| Niger | Visa required | | |
| Nigeria | eVisa | | |
| North Macedonia | Visa required | | Visa is not required for stays upto 15 days if holding a valid multiple entry visa of Canada, the United States, United Kingdom, Schengen Area member state, or residence permit of Schengen Area member state. |
| Norway | Visa not required | 90 days | 90 days within any 180 day period in the Schengen Area |
| Oman | eVisa | | |
| Pakistan | Visa not required | 1 month | Eligible to apply for Electronic Travel Authorization to obtain a visa on arrival for tourism purposes.; Eligible to apply for Electronic Travel Authorization to obtain a visa on arrival for business purposes.; Online Visa eligible. |
| Palau | Free Visa on arrival | 30 days | |
| Panama | Visa not required | 180 days | |
| Papua New Guinea | eVisa / Free visa on arrival | 60 days | |
| Paraguay | Visa required | | |
| Peru | Visa not required | 180 days | |
| Philippines | Visa not required | 30 days | |
| Poland | Visa not required | 90 days | 90 days within any 180 day period in the Schengen Area |
| Portugal | Visa not required | 90 days | 90 days within any 180 day period in the Schengen Area |
| Qatar | eVisa | 30 days | |
| Romania | Visa not required | 90 days | 90 days within any 180 day period |
| Russia | Visa not required | 60 days | For a maximum total stay of 90 days within one calendar year period |
| Rwanda | Visa not required | 30 days | |
| Saint Kitts and Nevis | eVisa | | |
| Saint Lucia | Visa not required | 6 weeks | |
| Saint Vincent and the Grenadines | Visa not required | 1 month | |
| San Marino | Visa not required | | |
| São Tomé and Príncipe | eVisa | | |
| Saudi Arabia | Visa required | | Tourist visa on arrival for holders of a valid multiple entry visa from US, UK or Schengen area, under the condition that the multiple entry visa has been used at least once, proving that by showing the entry and exit stamps of the country of issuance. |
| Senegal | Visa on arrival | 90 days | |
| Serbia | Visa required | | |
| Seychelles | Free Visitor's Permit on arrival | 3 months | |
| Sierra Leone | eVisa / Visa on arrival | | |
| Singapore | Visa not required | 30 days | |
| Slovakia | Visa not required | 90 days | 90 days within any 180 day period in the Schengen Area |
| Slovenia | Visa not required | 90 days | 90 days within any 180 day period in the Schengen Area |
| Solomon Islands | Free Visitor’s Permit on arrival | | |
| Somalia | eVisa | 30 days | |
| South Africa | Visa required | | |
| South Sudan | eVisa | | Obtainable online; Printed visa authorization must be presented at the time of travel |
| Spain | Visa not required | 90 days | 90 days within any 180 day period in the Schengen Area |
| Sri Lanka | ETA / Visa on arrival | | The standard visitor visa allows a stay of 60 days within any 6-month period.; Visa fees (for Standard visitor visa): SAARC - USD 35; Non SAARC - USD 75; e-Visa categories will be charged an additional USD 18.50 service fee.; If transiting from any of the Sri Lankan airports, An e-Visa is exempted (2 day transit period). |
| Sudan | Visa required | | |
| Suriname | eVisa | | |
| Sweden | Visa not required | 90 days | 90 days within any 180 day period in the Schengen Area |
| Switzerland | Visa not required | 90 days | 90 days within any 180 day period in the Schengen Area |
| Syria | eVisa | | |
| Tajikistan | Visa required | | |
| Tanzania | eVisa / Visa on arrival | 3 months | |
| Thailand | eVisa | | |
| Timor-Leste | Visa on arrival | 30 days | At Presidente Nicolau Lobato International Airport or the Dili Sea Port only. |
| Togo | eVisa | 15 days | |
| Tonga | Free Visa on arrival | | |
| Trinidad and Tobago | Visa not required | | |
| Tunisia | Visa required | | |
| Turkey | Visa required. | | |
| Turkmenistan | Visa required | | |
| Tuvalu | Free Visa on arrival | 1 month | |
| Uganda | eVisa | 3 months | May apply online. |
| Ukraine | eVisa | 30 days | |
| United Arab Emirates | eVisa | 30 days | May apply online.; May apply also using 'Smart service'. |
| United Kingdom and Crown dependencies | Electronic Travel Authorisation | 6 months | |
| United States | Visa required | | |
| Uruguay | Visa required | | |
| Uzbekistan | eVisa | 30 days | |
| Vanuatu | Visa not required | 90 days | |
| Vatican City | Visa not required | | |
| Venezuela | eVisa | | Introduction of Electronic Visa System for Tourist and Business Travelers. |
| Vietnam | eVisa | 30 days | |
| Yemen | Visa required | | |
| Zambia | Visa not required | 90 days | |
| Zimbabwe | Visa not required | 3 months | |

== Dependent, Disputed, or Restricted territories ==
Unrecognized or partially recognized countries

| Territory | Conditions of access | Notes |
|---|---|---|
| Abkhazia | Visa required | |
| Kosovo | Visa not required | |
| Northern Cyprus | Visa not required | |
| Palestine | Visa not required | Arrival by sea to Gaza Strip not allowed. |
| Sahrawi Arab Democratic Republic | | Undefined visa regime in the Western Sahara controlled territory. |
| Somaliland | Visa on arrival | 30 days for 30 US dollars, payable on arrival. |
| South Ossetia | Visa not required | Multiple entry visa to Russia and three day prior notification are required to enter South Ossetia. |
| Taiwan | Visa required | |
| Transnistria | Visa not required | Registration required after 24h. |

Dependent and autonomous territories

| Territory | Conditions of access | Notes |
China
| Hong Kong | Visa not required | 30 days |
| Macau | Visa not required | 30 days |
Denmark
| Faroe Islands | Visa not required | |
| Greenland | Visa not required | |
France
| French Guiana | Visa not required | |
| French Polynesia | Visa not required | |
| (France) French West Indies | Visa not required | Visa free for overseas departments of Guadeloupe and Martinique; Visa required for overseas collectivities of Saint Barthélemy and Saint Martin |
| Mayotte | Visa not required | |
| New Caledonia | Visa not required | |
| Réunion | Visa not required | |
| Saint Pierre and Miquelon | Visa not required | |
| Wallis and Futuna | Visa not required | 3 months |
Netherlands
| Aruba | Visa required | |
| Caribbean Netherlands | Visa required | Includes Bonaire, Sint Eustatius and Saba. |
| Curaçao | Visa required | |
| Sint Maarten | Visa required | |
New Zealand
| Cook Islands | Visa not required | 31 days |
| Niue | Visa not required | 30 days |
| Tokelau | Visa required | |
United Kingdom
| Akrotiri and Dhekelia | Visa not required | Stays longer than 28 days per 12-month period require a permit. |
| Anguilla | Visa not required | 3 months |
| Bermuda | Visa not required | |
| British Indian Ocean Territory | Special permit required | Special permit required. |
| British Virgin Islands | Visa not required | |
| Cayman Islands | Visa not required | |
| Falkland Islands | Visa required | |
| Gibraltar | Visa not required | |
| Montserrat | Visa not required | |
| Pitcairn Islands | Visa not required | 14 days visa free and landing fee US$35 or tax of US$5 if not going ashore. |
| Ascension Island | eVisa | 3 months within any year period |
| Saint Helena | Visitor's Pass required | Visitor's Pass granted on arrival valid for 4/10/21/60/90 days for 12/14/16/20/25 pound sterling. |
| Tristan da Cunha | Permission required | Permission to land required for 15/30 pounds sterling (yacht/ship passenger) for Tristan da Cunha Island or 20 pounds sterling for Gough Island, Inaccessible Island or Nightingale Islands. |
| South Georgia and the South Sandwich Islands | Permit required | Pre-arrival permit from the Commissioner required (72 hours/1 month for 110/160 pounds sterling). |
| Turks and Caicos Islands | Visa required | Holders of a valid visa issued by Canada, United Kingdom or the USA do not required a visa for a maximum stay of 90 days. |
United States
| American Samoa | Visa required | |
| Guam | Visa required | |
| Northern Mariana Islands | Visa required | |
| Puerto Rico | Visa required | |
| U.S. Virgin Islands | Visa required | |
Antarctica and adjacent islands
Special permits required for Bouvet Island, British Antarctic Territory, French Southern and Antarctic Lands, Argentine Antarctica, (Australia) Australian Antarctic Territory, (Antártica Chilena Province) Chilean Antarctic Territory, (Australia) Heard Island and McDonald Islands, (Norway) Peter I Island, (Norway) Queen Maud Land, (New Zealand) Ross Dependency.

== See also ==
- Visa policy of Samoa
- Samoan passport
