= Cinema of Samoa =

Samoa's first feature film, The Orator (O Le Tulafale), was released in 2011. Shot and set in Samoa, in the Samoan language, it has a Samoan cast. It was produced with financial support from the Samoan government, in the hopes of showcasing Samoan culture to an international audience, and of promoting Samoa as a tourist destination.

Before this, Samoa had only produced short films. Tusi Tamasese, the writer and director of The Orator, had previously written and directed the short film Sacred Spaces (Va Tapuia), which was screened in 2010 at the New Zealand International Film Festival, then at the imagineNATIVE Film and Media Arts Festival in Toronto and the Hawaii International Film Festival.

Samoa has only one cinema, the Magik cinema, owned by Maposua Rudolf Keil. The screening of films there is subject to censorship, and foreign films may be banned, in accordance with the Film Act 1978, for undermining the Christian faith of viewers. Both The Da Vinci Code and Milk have been banned from screening in Samoa's cinema, the latter for being "inappropriate and contradictory to Christian beliefs and Samoan culture".

== See also ==
- Cinema of the world
- World cinema
- List of Oceania films
