= .uz =

Internet country code top-level domain for Uzbekistan

- Introduced: 29 April 1995
- TLD type: Country code top-level domain
- Status: Active
- Registry: UZINFOCOM
- Sponsor: UZINFOCOM
- Intended use: Entities connected with Uzbekistan
- Actual use: Popular in Uzbekistan; also sees some use in Latvia
- Registration restrictions: None
- Structure: Registrations are directly at the second level; some third-level registrations also exist
- Documents: IANA redelegation report
- DNSSEC: yes
- Registry website: cctld.uz

.uz is the Internet country code top-level domain (ccTLD) for Uzbekistan. Registry services were formerly operated by Euracom GmBH, but were later redelegated to UZINFOCOM. Registrations are taken directly at the second level, but the former registry also advertised the availability of registrations at the third level beneath co.uz and com.uz, and some domain names under other second-level names such as org.uz also exist.

In Latvia, .uz is used as short-link address — ej.uz, which means "go to".

.uz has an A record and had a HTTP server since at least 1997.

== Second-level domains ==
The table of second-level domains of the .uz domain zone, terms of use, requirements, regulated users, domain categories.

Domain	Regulated users
.for.uz	Perpetual domain for ID.UZ users with PassportID status.
.gov.uz	State institutions of Uzbekistan.
.com.uz	Commercial organizations.
.co.uz	
.ac.uz	Institutes, higher educational institutions, cultural institutions conducting scientific research.
.edu.uz	Educational establishments.
.int.uz	International organizations.
.net.uz	Internet service providers.
.org.uz	Non-profit organizations.
.pp.uz	Individuals.

== History ==
The top-level domain .UZ was first created and delegated on April 29, 1995 by the IANA-based University of the Informatics Institute of Southern California to an individual named Alex Vostrikov from Tashkent. From 1995 to 2001, the domain "UZ" was registered free of charge for anyone. In 2001, the rights to administer the domain were transferred to a representative in Uzbekistan, Tomas LLC, under the management of Euracom Equipment GmBH. After the appeal of the Uzbek Agency of Post and Telecommunications in December 2002, ICANN and IANA decided to re-delegate the right to manage the ccTLD to the UZINFOCOM Center (now the Single Integrator UZINFOCOM), which is currently the administrator of the ccTLD "UZ".

On April 29, 2020, the national domain UZ celebrated its 25th anniversary

On April 28, 2021, the top-level domain .UZ was signed using DNSSEC technology

== Domains registration ==
Initially, the domain name "UZ" was issued free of charge until 2001. Then the registrar LLC "Tomas" took $89 per year for domain registration, with its subsequent reduction. In 2002, the price was reduced to $78, and from January 2003 - to $50 per year, and until 2005 it was $40. At the moment, the average price for domain registration in the "UZ" zone is 25,000 soums. The decline in prices began thanks to the emergence of six more official registrars since 2005. Currently, almost 92000 active domains are registered in the domain zone.

In September 2019, to protect domain owners from cybersquatting, the Redemption Period service was introduced, thanks to which the former domain owners, after the expiration of the registration period, have the right to redeem the expired domain in their own name.

== Domain registrars ==
Domain registration is carried out in accordance with the "Regulations on the procedure for registration and use of domain names in the UZ domain" by legal entities that have acquired the right to work in the UZ domain.

Currently, there are 25 accredited registrars of the "UZ" domain in Uzbekistan, 8 of them are state unitary enterprises "Computerization Center" under regional khakimiyats (administrations).

Registrars register domains for a period of 1 to 10 years.
