= .ws =

Internet country-code top-level domain for Samoa

- Introduced: 14 July 1995
- TLD type: Country code top-level domain
- Status: Active
- Registry: SamoaNIC (Computer Services Ltd. Samoa)
- Sponsor: Government of Samoa
- Intended use: Entities connected with Samoa
- Actual use: Not used much inside Samoa, popular for domain hacks, URL shortening and emoji domains
- Registration restrictions: None
- Structure: Registrations are directly at second level
- Documents: Policies
- Dispute policies: UDRP
- Registry website: SamoaNIC

.ws is the Internet country code top-level domain (ccTLD) for Samoa. It is administered by SamoaNIC, for the Ministry of Foreign Affairs of the Government of Samoa.

The .ws domain is an abbreviation for Western Samoa, which was the nation's official name in the 1970s when two-letter country codes were standardized. Although there are no geographic restrictions on registration of most second-level .ws domains, .org.ws, .gov.ws, and .edu.ws registration is restricted.

The .ws country code has been marketed as a domain hack, with the ws purportedly standing for "world site", website or web service, providing a "global" Internet presence to registrants, as it supports all internationalized domain names. A popular use for the domain is for news organizations for URL shortening purposes, mainly suffixed as "(organization name)ne.ws". Google Search treats the .ws ccTLD as a generic top-level domain (gTLD).

The registrar operates a sliding scale of prices depending on each domain's brevity. Domains with four characters or more are competitively priced while three-, two-, and single-character domains have their own pricing tiers, quickly scaling into thousands of United States dollars.

Prior to March 14, 2008, .ws domains were not allowed to be transferred from one domain registrar to another.

In 2016, .ws gained popularity as one of the first domain name registries to offer emoji domains. As of 2018, there are approximately 25,000 emoji domains registered on .ws.

== See also ==
- Internet in Samoa
