= Samoan passport =

Passport of the Independent State of Samoa issued to Samoan citizens

- Samoan passport front cover
- Type: Passport
- Issued by: Samoa
- Purpose: Identification
- Eligibility: Samoan citizenship
- Expiration: 10 years

The Samoan passport is an international travel document that is issued to Samoan citizens.

As of April 2025, Samoa citizens had visa-free or visa on arrival access to 129 countries and territories, ranking the Samoan passport 39th in terms of travel freedom according to the Henley Passport Index. Samoa signed a mutual visa waiver agreement with Schengen Area countries on 28 May 2015.

== See also ==
- Visa requirements for Samoan citizens
