= American Samoa Hawaii Cable =

The American Samoa Hawaii Cable (ASH Cable) was a fibre-optic cable connecting Hawaii and American Samoa.

== Construction ==
The cable has two segments. The first connects Keawaula, Oahu, Hawaii, with 'Ili'ili, American Samoa. It's made up of a section of the former Pac Rim East cable system and operates at 1.12 Gbps. The second segment connects 'Ili'ili with Apia, Samoa and operates at 2.5 Gbps.

The SAS cable between American Samoa and Samoa was upgraded to 100Gbps in 2018.

== Operation ==
The cable was commissioned in 2009 and was initially operated by ASH Cable LLC, a partnership between AST Telecom LLC and the government of American Samoa. Fiji's Amalgamated Telecommunications Holdings Limited (ATH) applied to the United States Federal Communications Commission (FCC) in 2017 to take over operation of the cable after it purchased the assets of AST Telecom LLC in 2016.

The original Samoa-Hawaii link was decommissioned on 16 July 2020.
