= Visa policy of Samoa =

Policy on permits required to enter Samoa

Most visitors to Samoa are issued a free 90-day Visitor's Permit on arrival unless they are citizens of one of the visa-exempt countries.

All visitors must have a passport valid for at least 6 months. All visitors must have a return or onward ticket, copy of a bank statement, no record of deportation from other countries, no health problems that would pose a risk to Samoa, no history of criminal charges.

== Visa policy map ==
Visa policy of Samoa Samoa Visa not required (90 days) Visa not required (60 days) Visa not required (30 days) Free Visitor's Permit on arrival

== Visa exemption ==
Citizens of the following countries may enter Samoa without a visa for the following period in accordance with bilateral agreements:

90 days

- Israel

90 days within any 180 days

- European Union member states (except Ireland)

- Iceland
- Liechtenstein
- Norway
- Switzerland

60 days

- Russia
- Hong Kong

30 days

- China^{1}
- Macau

_{1 - No more than 90 days within any 180-day period.}

Date of visa changes
- Unknown: Hong Kong
- 28 August 200: Macau
- 12 February 2016: European Union member states (except Ireland), Iceland, Liechtenstein, Norway, Switzerland
- 9 July 2017: Russia
- 6 July 2023: Israel
- 2 April 2025: China

== See also ==
- Visa requirements for Samoan citizens
