= Transport in Samoa =

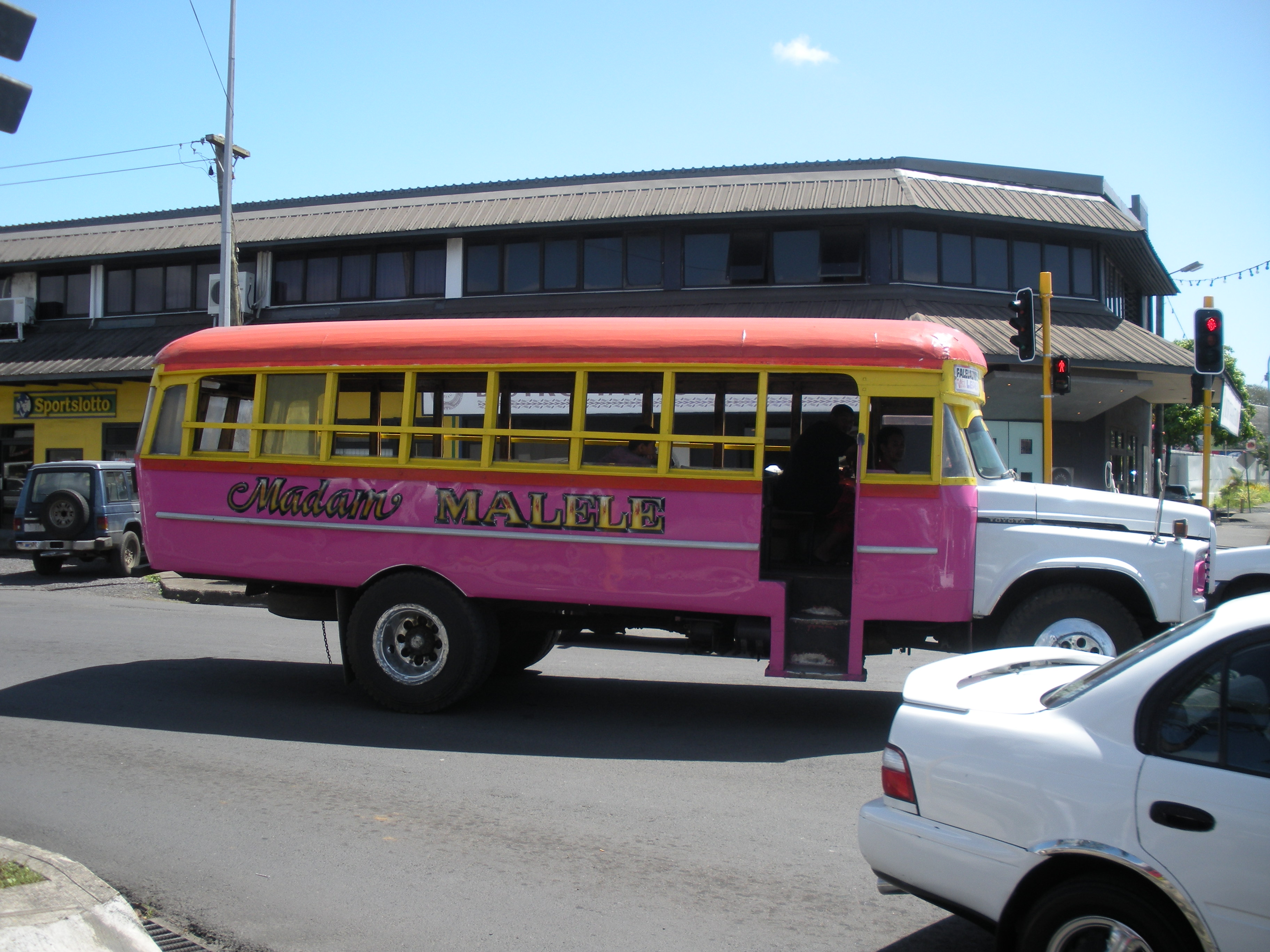
Local bus in the capital Apia.

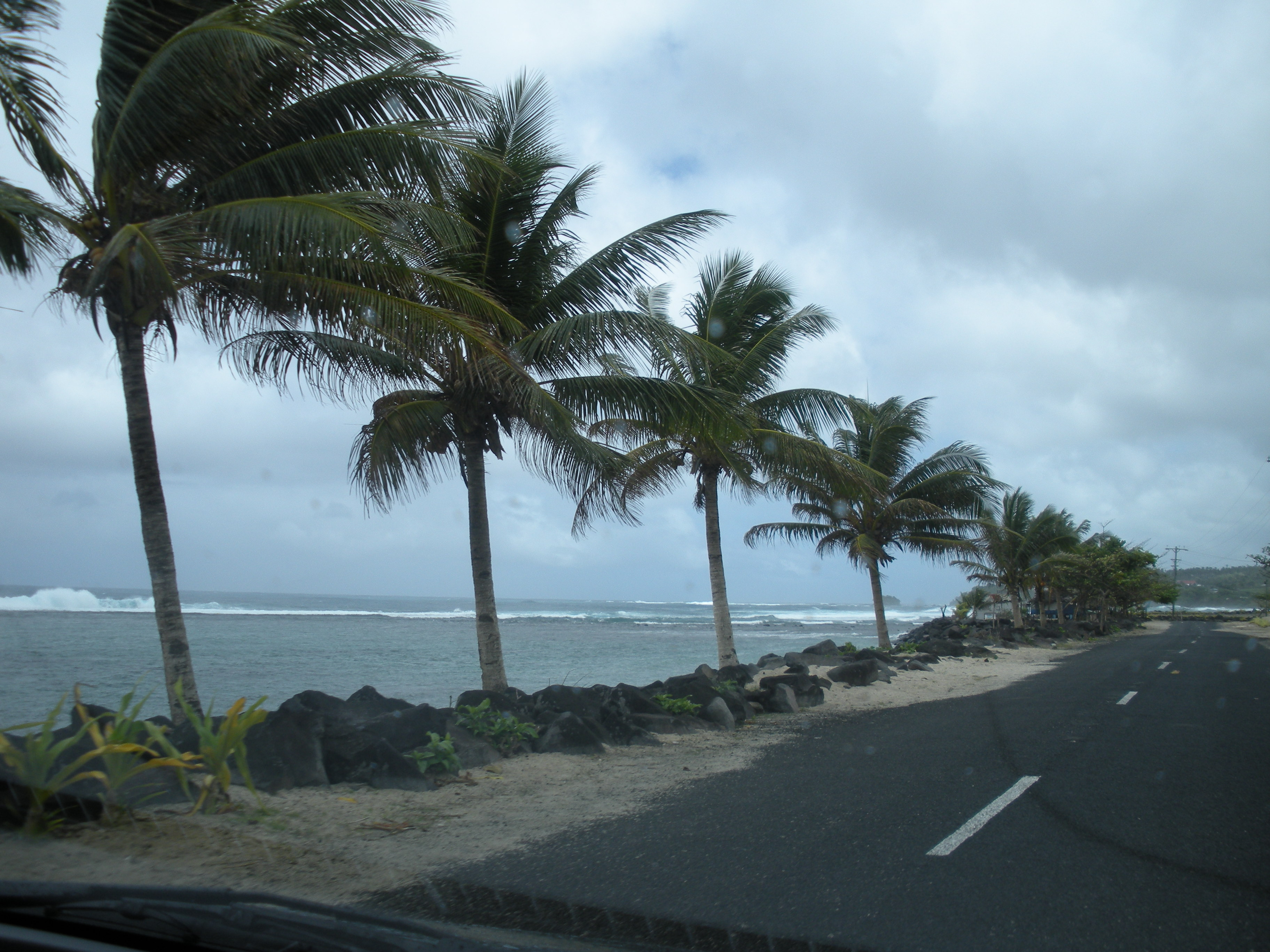
Coastal island highway.

Transport in Samoa includes one international airport situated on the north west coast of Upolu island, paved highways reaching most parts of the two main islands, one main port in the capital Apia and two ports servicing mainly inter island ferries for vehicles and passengers between the two main islands, Upolu and Savai'i.

== Highways ==
Highways:

(2001 est.)

total: 866 km (538 mi)

paved: 350 km (220 mi)

unpaved: 516 km (321 mi)

== Ports and harbors ==
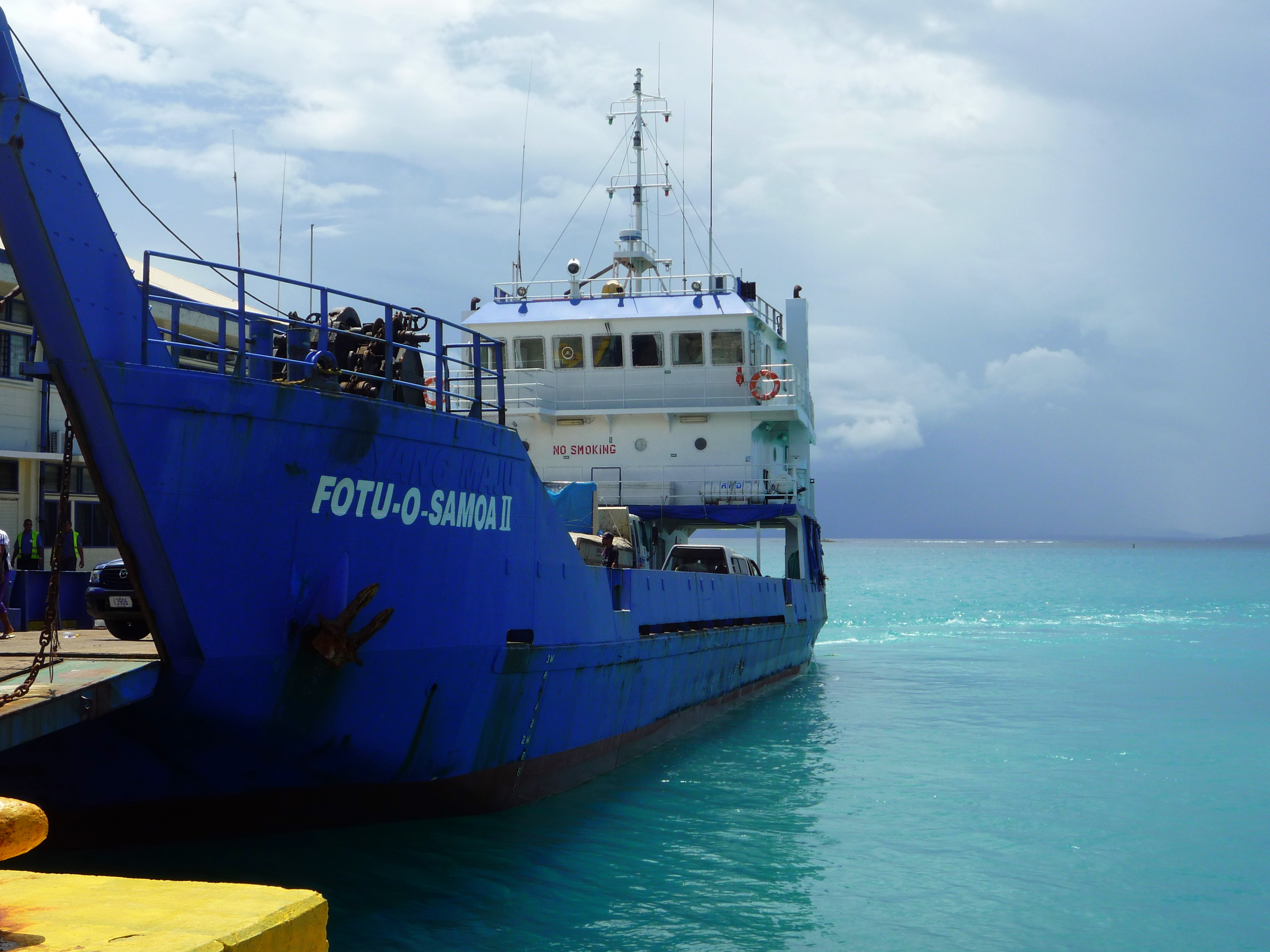
Fotu o Samoa II passenger and cargo ferry operating between Upolu and Savai'i islands.

Ports and harbors:

- Apia
- Asau - Small wharf situated on the north west coast of Savai'i island which is seldom used commercially.
- Mulifanua - The main ferry terminal on Upolu island for passenger, cargo and vehicles to Savai'i island.
- Salelologa - The only ferry terminal on Savai'i island and the main entry point onto the island.

== Airports ==
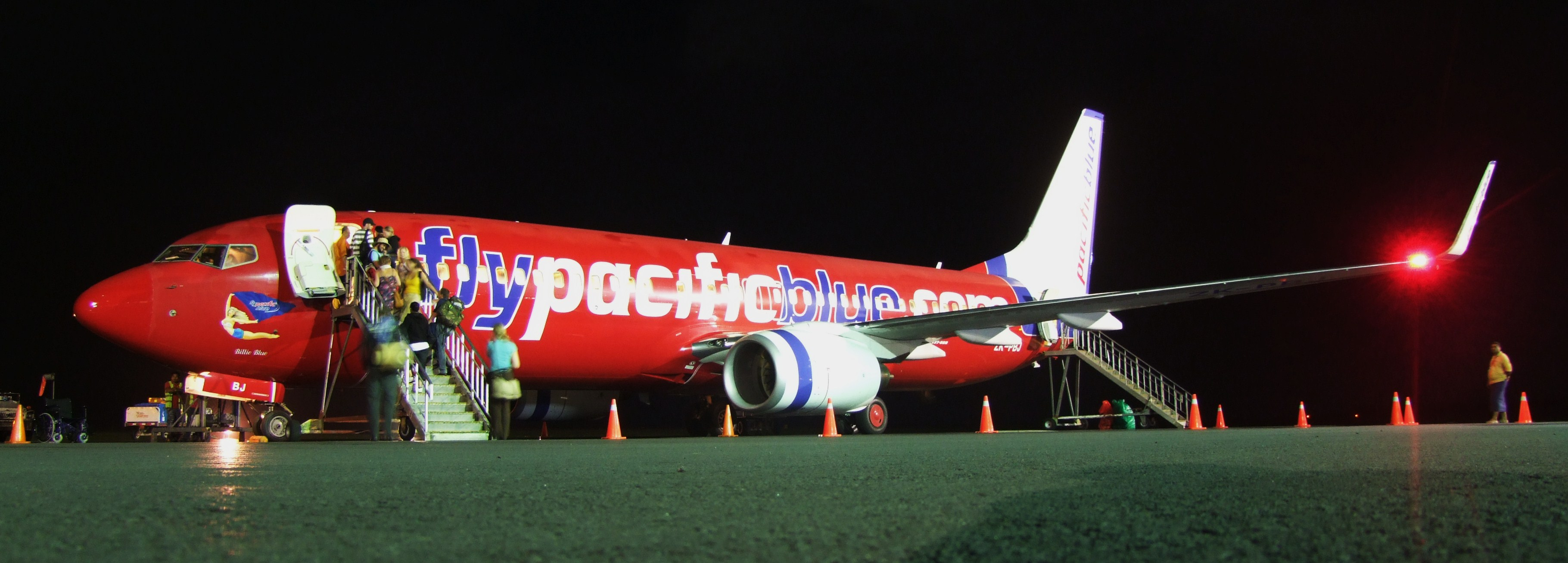
Night departure at Faleolo International Airport

Airports:

3 (2005)

Airports - with paved runways:

total: 2
2,438 to 3,047 m (7,999 to 9,997 ft): 1 (Apia Faleolo International Airport, IATA airport code APW)

under 914 m (2,999 ft): 1 (2005)

Airports - with unpaved runways:

total: 1

== Change from right-hand to left-hand traffic ==
From 1900 Samoa had been a German colony, and even after the occupation by New Zealand in 1914 it maintained the German practice of driving on the right-hand side of the road.

A plan to move to driving on the left was first announced by the Samoan government in September 2007. Prime Minister Tuilaepa Aiono Sailele Malielegaoi said that the purpose of adopting left-hand traffic was to allow Samoans to use cheaper right-hand-drive vehicles sourced from Australia, New Zealand or Japan, and so that the large number of Samoans living in Australasia could drive on the same side of the road when they visited their country of origin. He aimed to reduce reliance on expensive, left-hand-drive imports from America.

On 18 April 2008 Samoa's parliament passed the Road Transport Reform Act 2008. Tuisugaletaua Avea, the Minister of Transport, announced that the switch would come into effect at 6:00 am on Monday, 7 September 2009 - and that 7 and 8 September 2009 would be public holidays, so that residents would be able to familiarise themselves with the new rules of the road.

However the decision was controversial, with an estimated 18,000 people attending demonstrations against it in Apia in April 2008 and road signs reminding people of the change being vandalised. The motor industry was also opposed to the decision as 14,000 of Samoa's 18,000 vehicles were designed for right-hand driving and the government refused to meet the cost of conversion. Bus drivers whose doors would be on the wrong side of the road due to the change threatened to strike in protest of the change.

In order to reduce accidents, the government widened roads, added new road markings, erected signs and installed speed humps. The speed limit was also reduced from 35 to 25 mph (56 to 40 km/h) and sales of alcohol were banned for three days. Prayers were said by the Congregational Christian Church of Samoa for an accident-free changeover and Samoa's Red Cross carried out a blood donation campaign in case of a surge of accidents.

The change came into force following a radio announcement at 5.50 local time (16:50 UTC) which halted traffic and an announcement at 6.00 (15:00 UTC) for traffic to switch from the right to the left side of the road. Samoa thus became the first territory in over thirty years to change which side of the road is driven on, the previous most recent to change having been Okinawa (1978), South Yemen (1977), Ghana (1974) and Nigeria (1972).

== See also ==
- Samoa
- 730 (transport) – change to driving on the left in Okinawa in 1978
- Dagen H – change to driving on the right in Sweden in 1967
