= List of members of the Legislative Assembly of Samoa (2011–2016) =

Members of the Legislative Assembly of Samoa were elected on 4 March 2011. The Legislative Assembly consisted of 49 representatives, elected from six two-seat and 35 single-seat territorial constituencies, and two non-territorial constituencies. Only two of the MPs were women following the general election, a decline from four in the previous Parliament. A third woman, Faimalotoa Kika Stowers, joined them after winning a by-election in August 2014.

== Members ==
=== Initial MPs ===
Name	Party	Electorate	Term
Fonotoe Pierre Lauofo	HRPP	Anoama'a West	Third
Toeolesulusulu Cedric Schuster	TSP	A'ana Alofi No. 3	First
Tuilaepa Sailele Malielegaoi	HRPP	Lepa	Ninth
Aveau Niko Palamo	TSP	Faleata East	First
So’oalo Umi Feo Mene	HRPP	Gagaifomauga No. 2	First
Lefau Harry Schuster	TSP	Vaimauga West	First
Lenatai Victor Tamapua	HRPP	Vaimauga West	First
Tuileutu Alava'a Voi	TSP	Fa'asalele'aga No. 3	First
Papali’i Li’o Taeu Masipau Tuilagi	TSP	Fa'asalele'aga No. 2	First
Lealailepule Rimoni Aiafi	TSP	Faleata West	Second
Tavui Tiafau Tafu Salevao	HRPP	Satupa'itea	First
Tafua Maluelue Tafua	HRPP	Aleipata Itupa-I-Lalo	First
Laauli Leuatea Polataivao	HRPP	Gagaifomauga No. 3	Second
Fiame Naomi	HRPP	Lotofaga	Seventh
Lafaitele Patrick Leiataualesa	HRPP	Alataua West	Second
Manu'alesagalala Enokati Posala	HRPP	Safata	First
Palusalue Fa’apo II	TSP	Safata	Fourth
Ifopo Matia Filisi	HRPP	Aiga-I-Le-tai	First
Taefu Lemi	HRPP	Falelatai & Samatau	First
Muagututagata Peter Ah Him	HRPP	Sagaga-Le-Usoga	Third
Sala Fata Pinati	HRPP	Gagaemauga No. 1	Second
Taua Kitiona Seuala	HRPP	Aleipata-Itupa-I-luga	Fourth
Tolofuaivalelei Falemoe Lei’ataua	HRPP	A'ana Alofi No. 2	Fourth
Tuilo'a Anitele'a Tuilo'a	HRPP	Gagaifomauga No. 1	Second
Tuisugaletaua Sofara Aveau	HRPP	Vaimauga East	Third
Peseta Vaifou Tevaga	HRPP	Fa'asalele'aga No. 4	First
Alaiasa Filipo Schwarts Hunt	HRPP	Anoama'a East	First
Gatoloaifaana Amataga Alesana-Gidlow	HRPP	Fa'asalele'aga No. 1	Second
A'eau Peniamina	TSP	Falealupo	Fifth
Niko Lee Hang	HRPP	Individual	Third
Maualaivao Pat Ah Him	HRPP	Individual	First
Faumuina Tiatia Liuga	HRPP	Palauli-Le-Falefa	Third
Afualo Wood Salele	TSP	Salega West	First
Tapuai Toese Ah Sam	TSP	Salega East	First
Tuu'u Anasi'i Leota	HRPP	Si'umu	Fourth
Tialavea Fea Tionisio Seigafolava	HRPP	Va'a-O-Fonoti	First
Motuopuaa Uifagasa Aisoli	TSP	Vaisigano No. 2	Second
Tuiloma Lameko	HRPP	Falealili	Seventh
Tusa Misi Tupuola	HRPP	Falealili	First
Levaopolo Talatonu Va’ai	TSP	Gagaemauga No. 2	Second
Le Mamea Ropati	HRPP	Lefaga & Falese'ela	Eighth
Tuisa Tasi Patea	HRPP	Sagaga-Le-Falefa	First
Leaupepe Toleafoa Faafisi	HRPP	A'ana Alofi No. 1	Fifth
Tuitama Talalelei Tuitama	HRPP	A'ana Alofi No. 1	First
Magele Mauiliu Magele	HRPP	Fa'asalele'aga No. 1	First
Faamoetauloa Ulaitino Faale Tumaalii	HRPP	Gagaemauga No. 3	First
Afoafouvale John Moors	HRPP	Palauli East	First
Agafili Patisela Eteuati Tolovaa	HRPP	Palauli West	First
Va'ai Papu Vailupe	TSP	Vaisigano No.1	Fourth

=== Summary of changes ===
- Following the general election, the elections in four constituencies were voided by the Supreme Court due to acts of corruption (such as bribery and treating). Simultaneous by-elections were held in all four constituencies on 29 July 2011. The Human Rights Protection Party retained its seats in Anoamaa East (new MP: Alo Fulifuli Taveuveu), Aleipata Itupa I Luga (Fagaaivalu Kenrick Samu) and Satupaitea (Lautafi Fio Selafi Purcell), and won the seat of Vaisigano No.1 from the Tautua Samoa Party, with the election of Tufuga Gafoleata Faitua.
- Tuilo'a Anitele'a Tuilo'a (HRPP MP for Gaga'ifomauga 1) died on 9 June 2014, leading to a by-election on 15 August. Faimalotoa Kika Stowers (HRPP) was elected to replace him, bringing the number of women in Parliament to three.
