= Cabinet of Samoa =

Executive branch of Samoan government

The Cabinet is the executive branch of the government of the Independent State of Samoa.

Per article 31(1) of the Constitution, executive power is vested in the Head of State. Per article 26(1), however, "the Head of State in the performance of his functions shall act on the advice of Cabinet, the Prime Minister or the appropriate Minister, as the case may be". Article 32(1) provides that the Cabinet "shall have the general direction and control of the executive government" of Samoa.

The Cabinet is composed, per article 32(2), of the Prime Minister and "not fewer than eight nor more than twelve other Members of Parliament", appointed by the Head of State on the advice of the Prime Minister.

== XVII Cabinet ==
This Cabinet was appointed by Fiamē Naomi Mataʻafa during the 2021 Samoan constitutional crisis following the April 2021 Samoan general election. The previous cabinet purported to continue in a caretaker role. On 23 July 2021 the Court of Appeal ruled that the swearing-in ceremony was constitutional and binding, and that FAST had been the government since 24 May.

Toeolesulusulu Cedric Schuster resigned on 3 June 2021 after being arrested for drink-driving. He returned to Cabinet on 20 October 2021, with the addition of the Tourism portfolio.

A cabinet reshuffle in September 2023 moved Mulipola Anarosa Ale Molioo to the Women, Community and Social Development portfolio. She was replaced as Minister of Finance by Lautimuia Uelese Vaʻai. Leota Laki Lamositele became Minister of Commerce, Industry of Labour, with Leatinuu Wayne So'oialo retaining only the public enterprises portfolio. Laumatiamanu Ringo Purcell entered Cabinet as Minister for Sports & Recreation.

In January 2025 Laʻauli Leuatea Polataivao was charged with ten criminal offences. After refusing to resign, he was sacked from Cabinet on 10 January. Three other ministers were subsequently sacked. On 15 January Titimaea Tafua, Lagaaia Tiatuau Tufuga, Mauʻu Siaosi Puʻepuʻemai, and Niuava Eti Malolo were appointed as replacements.

Portfolio	Minister	Constituency	Party
Prime Minister; Prime Minister and Cabinet; Foreign Affairs and Trade; Tourism; Samoa Public Commission	Fiamē Naomi Mata‘afa	Lotofaga	FAST
Deputy Prime Minister; Customs and Revenue	Tuala Iosefo Ponifasio	Gagaemauga No. 1	FAST
Agriculture and Fisheries	La'auli Leuatea Polataivao	Gagaifomauga No. 3	FAST
Works, Transport and Infrastructure	Olo Fiti Vaai	Salega No. 2	FAST
Public Enterprises	Faumuina Asi Pauli Wayne Fong	Faleata No. 2	FAST
Women, Community and Social Development	Mulipola Anarosa Ale Molioo	Palauli No. 1	FAST
Justice and Courts Administration	Matamua Vasati Pulufana	Faasaleleaga No. 1	FAST
Police and Prisons	Lefau Harry Schuster	Vaimauga No. 4	FAST
Natural Resources and Environment	Toeolesulusulu Cedric Schuster	Aana Alofi No. 4	FAST
Health	Valasi Toogamaga Tafito	Vaisigano No. 2	FAST
Education and Culture	Seuula Ioane	Alataua Sisifo	FAST
Communications and Information Technology	Toelupe Poumulinuku Onesemo	Falealili No. 1	FAST
Commerce, Industry and Labour	Leota Laki Lamositele	Palauli No. 2	FAST
Finance	Lautimuia Uelese Vaʻai	Vaimauga 3	FAST
Sports & Recreation	Laumatiamanu Ringo Purcell	Safata No. 2	FAST

== XVI Cabinet ==
This cabinet resulted from the March 2016 general election.

A cabinet reshuffle in April 2019 made the following ministerial changes:

- Dr Tuitama Talalelei Tuitama moves from the Minister of Health to the Minister for Women, Community and Social Development
- Hon Faimalotoa Kika Stowers moves from the Minister for Women, Community and Social Development to the Minister of Health

Portfolio	Minister	Constituency	Party
Prime Minister; Prime Minister and Cabinet; Foreign Affairs and Trade; Police	Tuila'epa Sa'ilele Malielegaoi	Lepa	HRPP
Deputy Prime Minister; Natural Resources and Environment	Fiamē Naomi Mata‘afa	Lotofaga	HRPP
Commerce, Industry and Labour; Public Enterprises	Lautafi Fio Selafi Purcell	Satupaitea	HRPP
Tourism	Sala Fata Pinati	Gagaemauga No.1	HRPP
Women, Community and Social Development	Tuitama Talalelei Tuitama	Aana Alofi No.1 East	HRPP
Works, Transport and Infrastructure	Papaliitele Niko Lee Hang	Urban East	HRPP
Agriculture and Fisheries	Lopao'o Natanielu Mua	Vaisigano No.1	HRPP
Finance	Sili Epa Tuioti	Faasaleleaga No.1 East	HRPP
Health	Faimalotoa Kika Stowers	Gagaifomauga No.1	HRPP
Revenue	Tialavea Tionisio Hunt	Vaa o Fonoti	HRPP
Communications and Information Technology	Afamasaga Rico Tupai	Aana Alofi No.3	HRPP
Education, Sports and Culture	Loau Solamalemalo Keneti Sio	Sagaga le Falefa	HRPP
Justice and Courts Administration	Faaolesa Katopau Ainuu	Vaimauga Sisifo No.2	HRPP

== XV Cabinet ==
As of March 2011. This Cabinet results from the March 2011 general election, which saw the Human Rights Protection Party retain an absolute majority of seats in Parliament. Its term corresponds to that of the Fifteenth Parliament. The minister's matai title precedes his or her name.

In April 2014, Finance Minister Faumuina Tiatia Liuga resigned, after some twenty years in Cabinet, following "allegations of abuse in the performance of his ministerial duties". Prime Minister Malielegaoi took over the Finance portfolio himself.

Portfolio	Minister	Constituency	Party
Prime Minister; Foreign Affairs; Commerce	Tuila'epa Sa'ilele Malielegaoi	Lepa	HRPP
Deputy Prime Minister; Industry and Labour	Fonotoe Pierre Lauofo	Anoama'a West	HRPP
Women; Community and Social Development	Tolofuaivalelei Falemoe Leiʻataua	A'ana Alofi No. 2	HRPP
Police and Prisons	Sala Fata Pinati	Gagaemauga No. 1	HRPP
Public Works, Transport and Infrastructure	Manu'alesagalala Enokati Posala	Safata	HRPP
Natural resources and Environment	Faamoetauloa Ulaitino Faale Tumaalii	Gagaemauga No. 3	HRPP
Revenue	Tuiloma Pule Lameko	Falealili	HRPP
Health	Tuitama Talalelei Tuitama	A'ana Alofi No. 1	HRPP
Communication, Information and Technology	Tuisugaletaua Sofara Aveau	Vaimauga East	HRPP
Education; Sports; Culture	Magele Mauiliu Magele	Fa'asalele'aga No. 1	HRPP
Justice; Courts administration	Fiamē Naomi Mataʻafa	Lotofaga	HRPP
Agriculture; Fisheries	Le Mamea Ropati	Lefaga & Falese'ela	HRPP
Finance	Faumuina Tiatia Liuga	Palauli-Le-Falefa	HRPP

== XIV Cabinet ==
This Cabinet resulted from the 2006 Samoan general election.

Portfolio	Minister	Constituency	Party
Prime Minister; Foreign Affairs	Tuila'epa Sa'ilele Malielegaoi	Lepa	HRPP
Deputy Prime Minister; Trade, Commerce, Industry and Labour	Misa Telefoni Retzlaff	Falelatai & Samatau	HRPP
Finance	Niko Lee Hang	Individual Voters	HRPP
Health	Gatoloaifaana Amataga Alesana-Gidlow	Fa'asaleleaga No. 1	HRPP
Agriculture	Taua Kitiona Seuala	Aleipata-Itupa-I-luga	HRPP
Justice	Unasa Mesi Galo	Fa'asalele'aga No. 3	HRPP
Police and Prisons	Leaupepe Toleafoa Faafisi	Aana Alofi No. 1 West	HRPP
Women and Youth Affairs	Fiamē Naomi Mataʻafa	Lotofaga	HRPP
Communication, Information and Technology	Mulitalo Siafausa Vui	Fa'asaleleaga No. 4	HRPP
Education	Toomata Alapati Poese	Salega	HRPP
Public Works	Tuisugaletaua Sofara Aveau	Vaimauga East	HRPP
Lands and Environment	Faumuina Tiatia Liuga	Palauli-Le-Falefa	HRPP
Revenue	Tuu'u Anasi'i Leota	Si'umu	HRPP

== XIII Cabinet ==
This Cabinet resulted from the 2001 Samoan general election.

Tuu'u Anasi'i Leota was appointed Minister of Revenue and Ga'ina Tino was moved to Minister of Justice following the death of Seumanu Aita Ah Wa in January 2004.

Portfolio	Minister	Constituency	Party
Prime Minister; Foreign Affairs	Tuila'epa Sa'ilele Malielegaoi	Lepa	HRPP
Deputy Prime Minister; Finance	Misa Telefoni Retzlaff	Falelatai & Samatau	HRPP
Education	Fiamē Naomi Mataʻafa	Lotofaga	HRPP
Tourism, Trade, Commerce, Industry and Labour	Hans Joachim Keil III	Individual Voters	HRPP
Lands and Environment	Tuala Tagaloa Sale Kerslake	Anoamaa West	HRPP
Health	Mulitalo Siafausa Vui	Fa'asaleleaga No. 4	HRPP
Transport	Palusalue Faʻapo II	Safata	HRPP
Women	Tuala Ainiu Iusitino	Gaga'emauga No. 1	HRPP
Public Works	Faumuina Tiatia Liuga	Palauli-Le-Falefa	HRPP
Agriculture	Tuisugaletaua Sofara Aveau	Vaimauga East	HRPP
Sports, Youth and Culture	Ulu Vaomalo Kini	Faleata West	HRPP
Justice	Seumanu Aita Ah Wa	Fa'asalele'aga No. 1	HRPP
Legislative Department & Audit (Revenue)	Ga'ina Tino	Gaga'ifomauga No. 1	HRPP
