= Tuiloʻa Aniteleʻa Tuiloʻa =

Samoan politician

Member of the Samoa Parliament for Gagaʻifomauga 1
- In office 31 March 2006 – 9 June 2014
- Preceded by: Gaʻina Tino
- Succeeded by: Faimalotoa Kika Stowers

Personal details
- Died: 9 June 2014 Siusega, Samoa
- Party: Human Rights Protection Party

Tuiloʻa Toeulu Aniteleʻa Tuiloʻa (~1952 — 9 June 2014) was a Samoan politician and former member of the Legislative Assembly of Samoa. He was a member of the Human Rights Protection Party.

Tuiloʻa was from Siusega. He was first elected to the Legislative Assembly at the 2006 Samoan general election. He was re-elected at the 2011 election and appointed Associate Minister for the Ministry of Women, Community and Social Development. In January 2012 he threatened to assault fellow HRPP MP Peseta Vaifou Tevaga on the floor of parliament. Later that year he called on New Zealand Samoans to vote out Labour MP Suʻa William Sio after the latter had criticised Samoan fundraising in his electorate. Suffering from kidney failure and requiring regular dialysis, he used his place in parliament to advocate for better dialysis treatment for Samoans.

He died at his home in Siusega on 9 June 2014. His death sparked the 2014 Gagaʻifomauga by-election.
