= Mulitalo Siafausa Vui =

Samoan politician

Minister of Communications and Information Technology
- In office 24 April 2006 – 16 August 2006
- Prime Minister: Tuilaepa Aiono Sailele Malielegaoi
- Preceded by: Misa Telefoni Retzlaff
- Succeeded by: Safuneitu'uga Pa'aga Neri

Minister of Health
- In office 20 March 2001 – 24 April 2006
- Preceded by: Misa Telefoni Retzlaff
- Succeeded by: Gatoloaifaana Amataga Alesana-Gidlow

Deputy Speaker of the Legislative Assembly of Samoa
- In office 1996 – 20 March 2001

Member of the Samoa Parliament for Fa'asaleleaga No. 4
- In office 26 April 1996 – 16 August 2006
- Preceded by: Vui Viliamu
- Succeeded by: Vui Tupe Ioane

Personal details
- Died: 21 July 2013 Tupua Tamasese Mea'ole hospital, Apia, Samoa
- Party: Human Rights Protection Party

Vaiotu Mulitalo Sealiimalietoa Siafausa Vui (1945 - 21 July 2013) was a Samoan politician and Cabinet Minister.

Vui was born in Lano, Samoa and had served as Commissioner of Police. He was first elected to the Legislative Assembly of Samoa in the 1996 election and served as Deputy Speaker. He was re-elected in the 2001 election and appointed Minister of Health. As Health Minister he established the Kidney Foundation and a local dialysis unit. In September 2005 while Acting Prime Minister he attempted to crush strike action by local doctors by bringing in strikebreakers from New Zealand. After a government inquiry into the doctors' grievances failed to recommend a pay rise, all public hospital doctors resigned.

He was re-elected in the 2006 election and appointed Minister of Communications and Information Technology. He was subsequently convicted of bribery and treating in an election petition brought by his defeated rival Sua Rimoni Ah Chong, and his election was declared void. Vui threatened to sue the Attorney-General's office for failing to support him, and encouraged the government to bring criminal charges against Ah Chong, which ultimately resulted in his conviction.

Vui was subsequently appointed Public Service Commissioner in October 2007. In 2008 he appeared in court on charges of carrying a weapon after arming himself with a rifle during a land dispute. He was eventually convicted and discharged. In March 2009 he and his family were banished for life from the village of Vaimoso after bestowing a high-ranking matai title on members of his family without village permission. The banishment was subsequently upheld by the lands and Titles Court.

Vui ran again for the seat of Fa'asaleleaga No. 4 in the 2011 election, but was unsuccessful.

In 2009 he was charged with 20 counts of indecent assault against a woman who worked for him. The case was not made public as he was granted name suppression. In July 2012 he was convicted on ten counts. An initial sentence of a $3,000 fine was appealed, and he was ultimately given a two-year suspended sentence.

He died of heart failure at Tupua Tamasese Mea'ole hospital in Apia in July 2013.
