= Gaʻina Tino =

Samoan politician

Minister of Justice
- In office 20 February 2004 – 24 April 2006
- Prime Minister: Tuilaʻepa Saʻilele Malielegaoi
- Preceded by: Seumanu Aita Ah Wa
- Succeeded by: Unasa Mesi Galo

Minister of Revenue
- In office 20 March 2001 – 20 February 2004
- Succeeded by: Tuʻuʻu Anasiʻi Leota

Member of the Samoan Parliament for Gagaʻifomauga No. 1
- In office 5 April 1991 – 31 March 2006
- Preceded by: Timu Lafaele
- Succeeded by: Tuiloʻa Aniteleʻa Tuiloʻa

Personal details
- Party: Human Rights Protection Party

Gaʻina Tino is a Samoan politician and former Cabinet Minister. He is a member of the Human Rights Protection Party.

He was first elected to the Legislative Assembly of Samoa at the 1991 election. He was re-elected in 1996, and in 2001. In 2001 he was appointed Minister of Legislative Department and Audit (revenue). He was shifted to the Justice portfolio in February 2004 following the death of Justice Minister Seumanu Aita Ah Wa. He lost his seat at the 2006 election.

In 2014 he stood in the 2014 Gagaʻifomauga by-election, losing to Faimalotoa Kika Stowers.

He was subsequently appointed to the board of the Samoa Trust Estates Corporation.
