= Hans Joachim Keil III =

Samoan politician (1944–2018)

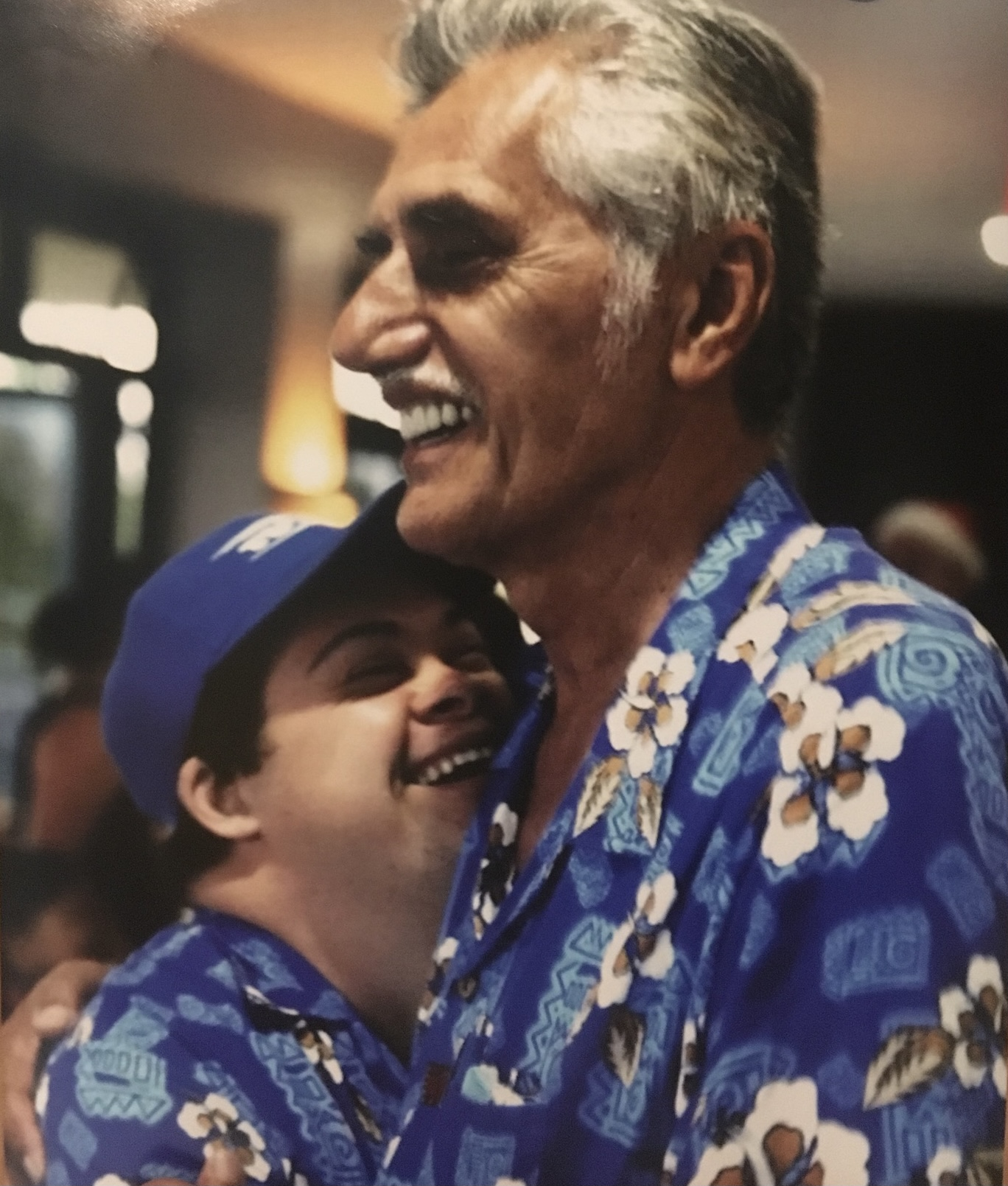
- Keil and his son

Minister of Commerce, Industry and Labour
- In office 20 March 2001 – 24 April 2006
- Prime Minister: Tuilaepa Aiono Sailele Malielegaoi
- Preceded by: Tuala Tagaloa Sale Kerslake
- Succeeded by: Misa Telefoni Retzlaff

Minister of Trade and Tourism
- In office 20 March 2001 – 24 April 2006
- Preceded by: Tuala Tagaloa Sale Kerslake
- Succeeded by: Misa Telefoni Retzlaff

Member of the Samoa Parliament for Individual Voters
- In office 26 February 1988 – 4 March 2011
- Preceded by: George Lober
- Succeeded by: Maualaivao Pat Ah Him

Personal details
- Born: 11 May 1944 Samoa
- Died: 31 August 2019 (aged 75)
- Party: Human Rights Protection Party

Hans Joachim "Joe" Keil (11 May 1944 – 31 August 2018) was a Samoan politician, Cabinet Minister, and diplomat. He was a member of the Human Rights Protection Party.

Keil was born in Samoa (then Western Samoa); his father, who was of German origin, was the first official lottery operator in the country. His mother was Samoan and Chinese. He was educated at Leifiifi Primary School and in New Zealand. He later trained as a pilot at the Spartan School of Aeronautics before working for Air Samoa and Polynesian Airlines. Keil owned Apia Broadcasting, which operated Samoan channel TV3 until its sale to Radio Polynesia in April 2018.

He was first elected to the Fono in 1988, representing the individual voters constituency. In 2001 he was appointed Minister of Trade, Tourism, Commerce, Industry and Labour. He was re-elected in 2006, and appointed Associate Minister of Trade Commerce and Industry and Labour. He retired from politics at the 2011 election.

== Arrest by US border guards ==
On 9 September 2008, while in Branson, Missouri assisting Samoans employed at a theater there, Keil was arrested by United States immigration agents and jailed. A U.S. Navy veteran and American citizen, he had presented his American passport on entry but in Branson also presented his Samoan diplomatic passport. A database search by the agents showed that Keil had twice applied for certification of American citizenship based on being born abroad to a mother who was an American citizen, but she had not resided in the United States for the five years after her sixteenth birthday that the law then required, and Keil had not appeared for the required interview to discuss this. A petition with almost 10,000 signatures was presented to the U.S. Embassy in Apia, Samoa after a peaceful march. Mark Moors, one of the petition presenters and march spokesman, told Radio New Zealand International's correspondent in Apia, Autagavaia Tipi Autagavaia that the petition would be passed on to Condoleezza Rice, US Secretary of State.

A month after his arrest, Keil became aware that he held American citizenship through his father, because his paternal grandfather had become a naturalized citizen of the United States. In December a United States magistrate in Springfield, Missouri dropped the charges against him and ordered the $25,000 bond he had been required to pay to return to Samoa to be refunded to him.

Keil sued the immigration agents for unlawful detention, also claiming that his Samoan passport was unlawfully seized and he was not allowed to contact the Samoan embassy on his arrest and that he was denied access to legal counsel when being interviewed by government agents. His suit was rejected by the district court, which held the immigration agents had legal immunity because they had sufficient cause to doubt Keil's claim of American citizenship, and the district court's judgement was upheld on appeal in November 2011.
