= Toomata Alapati Poese =

Samoan politician

Minister of Education
- In office 24 April 2006 – 21 March 2011
- Prime Minister: Tuilaepa Aiono Sailele Malielegaoi
- Preceded by: Fiame Naomi Mataʻafa
- Succeeded by: Magele Mauiliu Magele

Minister of Agriculture and Fisheries
- In office 2005–2006

Member of the Samoa Parliament for Salega
- In office 1999 – 4 March 2011
- Succeeded by: None (Constituency split)

Personal details
- Died: 20 April 2014
- Party: Human Rights Protection Party

Toomata Alapati Poese (~1950 - 20 April 2014) was a Samoan politician and Cabinet Minister. He was a member of the Human Rights Protection Party.

Toomata was educated at the University of Hawaiʻi and worked as a lecturer at the School of Agriculture at the University of the South Pacific. He was first elected to the legislative Assembly of Samoa in a by-election in 1999. He was re-elected in the 2001 election and in 2005 was appointed Minister of Agriculture and Fisheries.

He was re-elected at the 2006 election and appointed Minister of Education. In November 2009 he broke a leg in a car accident. He subsequently pleaded guilty to two charges of careless driving, and was fined US$150.

He lost his seat in the 2011 election.
