= Magele Mauiliu Magele =

Samoan politician

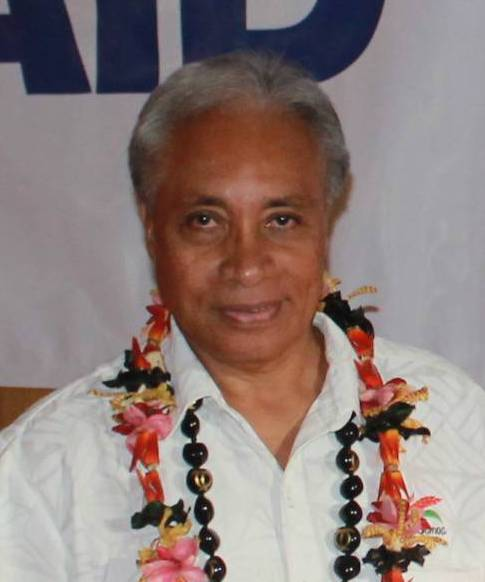
- Magele in 2013

Minister of Education, Sports and Culture
- In office 21 March 2011 – 4 March 2016
- Prime Minister: Tuilaepa Aiono Sailele Malielegaoi
- Preceded by: Toomata Alapati Poese
- Succeeded by: Keneti Sio

Member of the Samoa Parliament for Fa'asalele'aga No. 1
- In office 4 March 2011 – 4 March 2016
- Preceded by: Tiata Pulufana Saunoa
- Succeeded by: Gatoloaifaana Amataga Alesana-Gidlow

Personal details
- Party: Human Rights Protection Party

Magele Mauiliu Magele is a former Samoan politician and Cabinet Minister. He is a member of the Human Rights Protection Party.

Magele is a former Vice Chancellor of the National University of Samoa. He was first elected to the Fono at the 2011 Samoan general election, and appointed Minister of Education, Sports and Culture. Following his election he was briefly suspended as a Minister pending the hearing of an electoral petition for bribery, but returned to work in May 2011. In 2013 he was recognised by the World Education Congress for his "Outstanding Contribution to Education".

Magele lost his seat at the 2016 election. Following his election loss he was appointed Trade & Investment Commissioner at the Samoan consulate in Auckland, New Zealand.
