= Tialavea Tionisio Hunt =

Samoan politician

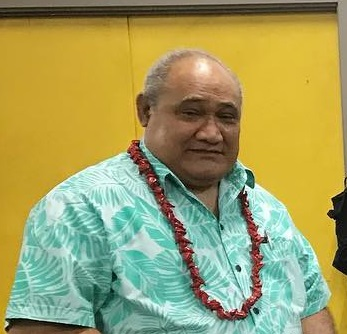
- Hunt in 2020

Minister of Police
- In office 26 March 2020 – 24 May 2021
- Prime Minister: Tuilaʻepa Saʻilele Malielegaoi
- Preceded by: Tuilaʻepa Saʻilele Malielegaoi
- Succeeded by: Lefau Harry Schuster

Minister of Prisons
- In office 30 June 2016 – 24 May 2021
- Preceded by: Sala Fata Pinati
- Succeeded by: Lefau Harry Schuster

Minister of Customs & Revenue
- In office 18 March 2016 – 24 May 2021
- Preceded by: Tuiloma Pule Lameko
- Succeeded by: Tuala Iosefo Ponifasio

Member of the Samoan Parliament for Vaʻa-o-Fonoti
- In office 4 March 2011 – 9 April 2021
- Preceded by: Tuitama Talalelei Tuitama
- Succeeded by: Alaiasa Sepulona Moananu

Personal details
- Party: Human Rights Protection Party

Tialavea Fea Leniu Tionisio Hunt is a Samoan politician and former Cabinet Minister. He is a member of the Human Rights Protection Party.

Hunt was educated at St. Peters school in Falefa, Marist Brothers Mulivai and St Josephs College, Lotopa. he worked in printing and construction before becoming a member of the board of the Samoa Shipping Corporation and the Development Bank of Samoa. He was first elected to the Legislative Assembly of Samoa at the 2011 Samoan general election, and appointed Associate Minister of Finance and Associate Minister of Police and Prisons.

Following the 2016 election Hunt was appointed as Minister of Revenue. A cabinet reshuffle in June 2016 saw him gain the prisons and corrections portfolio. In June 2017 he was responsible for a controversial policy to tax church ministers. When churches refused to pay, he threatened to seize their assets. Ministers were subsequently prosecuted for failing to pay tax, and taxes were deducted from bank accounts.

In September 2017 he advocated for the deportation of foreigners convicted of crimes in Samoa. later that year he opposed the repatriation of Samoans convicted in American Samoa. In early 2018 he faced calls to resign after he released a prisoner to attend a matai ceremony.

In March 2020 Hunt was given responsibility for the Police as well as his existing Corrections portfolio. In July 2020 he called for judicial corporal punishment for rapists. In August 2020 he defended using prison inmates as unpaid labour for "personal projects" such as clearing land belonging to his family.

He lost his seat in the 2021 Samoan general election.
