= 2014 Gagaʻifomauga by-election =

By-election held in Samoa

- 15 August 2014

Constituency of Gagaʻifomauga
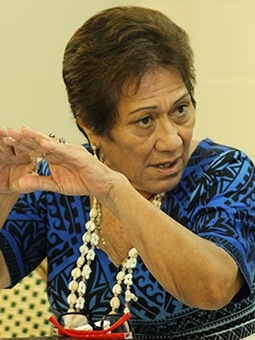
	First party	Second party	Third party
		HRPP	HRPP
Candidate	Faimalotoa Kika Stowers	Lavea Ieti	Taito Vaea Tanu
Party	HRPP	HRPP	HRPP
Popular vote	1,045	232	198
Percentage	27.24%	23.58%	20.12%
	Fourth party	Fifth party
	HRPP	TSP
Candidate	Gaʻina Tino	Lavea Peseta Nafoʻi
Party	HRPP	TSP
Popular vote	185	101
Percentage	18.80%	10.26%
MP before election
Aniteleʻa Tuiloʻa
HRPP
Subsequent MP
Faimalotoa Kika Stowers
HRPP

A by-election was held in the Gagaʻifomauga no.1 constituency in Samoa on 15 August 2014.

The Gagaʻifomauga no.1 seat in the Legislative Assembly had been held by Aniteleʻa Tuiloʻa for the Human Rights Protection Party in the 2011 general election; he had first won it in 2006. During the 15th Parliament, he served as an associate minister in the Ministry for Women, Community and Social Development. He died of kidney failure on 9 June 2014.

Despite it being a single seat constituency, the ruling Human Rights Protection Party, as often, nominated several candidates - in this instance, four: Gaʻina Tino (a former Minister for Justice), Faimalotoa Kolotita Stowers (former Director and CEO of the Samoa Broadcasting Service), Lavea Ieti, and Taito Vaea Tanu. This despite having nominated only one candidate in the constituency in the 2011 general election. The opposition Tautua Samoa Party chose a single candidate: Lavea Peseta Lua Nafoʻi.

== Results ==
Kolotita Stowers, the only woman among the five candidates, was elected - bringing to three the number of women in the 15th Samoan Parliament. The Tautua Samoa Party candidate finished last.

Gagaʻifomauga by-election, 2014
Party	Candidate	Votes	%
HRPP	Faimalotoa Kika Stowers	268	27.24
HRPP	Lavea Ieti	232	23.58
HRPP	Taito Vaea Tanu	198	20.12
HRPP	Gaʻina Tino	185	18.80
TSP	Lavea Peseta Nafoʻi	101	10.26
HRPP hold			

== 2011 results ==
2011 Samoan general election in Gagaʻifomauga no.1 constituency
Party	Candidate	Votes	%
HRPP	Aniteleʻa Tuiloʻa	504	61.1
Independent	Aukusitino Gaiga	321	38.9
HRPP hold			
