= Seumanu Aita Ah Wa =

Samoan politician

Minister of Justice
- In office 20 March 2001 – 23 January 2004
- Prime Minister: Tuila'epa Sa'ilele Malielegaoi
- Preceded by: Molioo Teofilo Vaeluaga
- Succeeded by: Ga'ina Tino

Minister of Agriculture
- In office 1979–1982

Member of the Samoa Parliament for Fa'asaleleaga No. 1
- In office 21 May 1999 – 23 January 2004
- Preceded by: Tofilau Eti Alesana
- Succeeded by: Tiata Sili Pulufana
- In office 24 February 1979 – 22 February 1985
- Preceded by: Lilomaiava Niko
- Succeeded by: Matautia Sa'e

Personal details
- Died: 23 January 2004 Auckland, New Zealand
- Party: Human Rights Protection Party

Seumanu Aita Ah Wa (died 23 January 2004) was a Samoan politician and former Cabinet Minister. He was a member of the Human Rights Protection Party.

Seumanu was a businessman. He was first elected to the Legislative Assembly of Samoa at the 1979 election, and was appointed Minister of Agriculture. He lost his seat in the 1985 election. Following the death of former Prime Minister Tofilau Eti Alesana he was re-elected to parliament in the 1999 Fa’asalele’aga No 1 By-election. He was re-elected in 2001 and was appointed Minister of Justice.

Seumanu died of cancer in Auckland, New Zealand where he was receiving medical treatment. He was given a state funeral and buried at his home village of Saleimoa. His death triggered the 2004 Fa’asalele’aga No 1 By-election, which was won by Tiata Sili Pulufana.
