= Faumuina Tiatia Liuga =

Samoan politician

Minister of Finance
- In office 21 March 2011 – 26 April 2014
- Prime Minister: Tuilaʻepa Saʻilele Malielegaoi
- Preceded by: Tapunuu Niko Lee Hang
- Succeeded by: Tuilaʻepa Saʻilele Malielegaoi

Minister of Natural Resources & Environment
- In office 24 April 2006 – 21 March 2011
- Prime Minister: Tuilaʻepa Saʻilele Malielegaoi
- Succeeded by: Faamoetauloa Ulaitino Faale Tumaalii

Minister of Works, Transport and Infrastructure
- In office 20 March 2001 – 24 April 2006
- Prime Minister: Tuilaʻepa Saʻilele Malielegaoi
- Succeeded by: Tuisugaletaua Sofara Aveau

Member of the Samoan Parliament for Palauli-Le-Falefa
- In office 2 March 2001 – 9 April 2021
- Preceded by: Le Tagaloa Pita
- Succeeded by: Leota Laki Lamositele

Personal details
- Born: 19 September 1945 Papa i Palauli, Western Samoa Trust Territory (Now Samoa)
- Died: March 2025 (aged 79)
- Party: Human Rights Protection Party

Faumuina Tiatia Faaolatane Liuga (19 September 1945 – March 2025) was a Samoan politician and former Cabinet Minister. He was a member of the Human Rights Protection Party.

Faumuina was born in Papa i Palauli and educated at Leulumoega Fou College Malua in Samoa. He studied economics at the National University of Samoa from 1982 to 1984, and in 1999 gained an MBA from the unaccredited Washington International University. From 1967 to 1997 he worked for the United Nations Development Programme, serving in Samoa, the Philippines, Fiji, Sudan, Bangladesh, Vietnam and Pakistan. From 1997 to 1998 he worked as Chief Administrator for the UN Oil-for-Food Programme in Iraq. Between 1999 and 2000 he served as Director of Administration for the UN mission to East Timor before serving as Chief Administrator of the UN Peacekeeping Mission in Georgia.

Faumuina was first elected to the Fono as MP for the seat of Palauli-Le-Falefa in the 2001 election. From 2001 to 2006 he served as Minister of Works, Transport and Infrastructure. He was re-elected in 2006 and appointed Minister of Natural Resources & Environment. In 2007 he chaired the Pacific Games. He was re-elected for a third time at the 2011 and appointed Minister of Finance.

On 16 May 2013 Faumuina survived a caucus vote after fellow members of his party complained of mismanagement and misuse of funds. In April 2014, Faumuina resigned, after some twenty years in Cabinet, following "allegations of abuse in the performance of his ministerial duties". Prime Minister Malielegaoi took over the Finance portfolio himself. Faumuina was subsequently appointed Associate Minister for Natural Resources and Environment.

In March 2016, in the leadup to the 2016 election, Faumuina was banished from his village after successfully challenging the eligibility of paramount chief Le Tagaloa Pita, who wished to run against him. After he was re-elected he ran for deputy leader of the HRPP, but was defeated by Fiame Naomi Mata'afa in a caucus vote. He was not appointed to Cabinet.

Liuga lost his seat at the 2021 election.

Liuga died in March 2025, at the age of 79.
