= Tolofuaivalelei Falemoe Leiʻataua =

Samoan politician (1950–2026)

Minister of Women, Community and Social Development
- In office 18 March 2011 – 4 March 2016
- Prime Minister: Tuilaʻepa Saʻilele Malielegaoi
- Preceded by: Fiamē Naomi Mataʻafa
- Succeeded by: Faimalotoa Kika Stowers

Speaker of the Legislative Assembly of Samoa
- In office 22 April 2006 – 18 March 2011
- Preceded by: Leaupepe Toleafoa Faafisi
- Succeeded by: Laauli Leuatea Polataivao

Deputy Speaker of the Legislative Assembly of Samoa
- In office 2001–2006

Minister of Posts Office and Telecommunications
- In office April 1996 – September 1996
- Prime Minister: Tofilau Eti Alesana

Member of the Samoan Parliament for Aʻana Alofi No. 2
- In office 2 March 2001 – 4 March 2016
- Preceded by: Muagututia Samuelu
- Succeeded by: Ili Setefano Taʻateo
- In office 26 April 1996 – September 1996
- Preceded by: Amiatu Sio
- Succeeded by: Muagututia Samuelu

Personal details
- Born: 13 August 1950
- Died: 9 September 2026 (aged 76)
- Party: Human Rights Protection Party

Tolofuaivalelei Falemoe Leiʻataua (13 August 1950 – 9 September 2026) was a Samoan politician and Cabinet Minister. He served as Speaker of the Samoan Legislative Assembly from 2006-2011. Leiʻataua was a member of the Human Rights Protection Party (HRPP).

== Life and career ==
Leiʻataua was first elected to Parliament in 1996 and served briefly as Minister of Posts Office and Telecommunications before losing his seat in September of that year. He was re-elected in the 2001 general election and was appointed Deputy Speaker. In 2006 he became Speaker of the Legislative Assembly.

His term as Speaker was marked by battles to prevent the formation of parties to rival the HRRP. In 2009, following the formation of the Tautua Samoa Party, he invoked anti-party-hopping laws to evict all nine of its members from the House. The MPs were later reinstated by the Supreme Court of Samoa. In 2010 the government passed new laws forbidding MPs from joining or declaring their support for political parties or organisations with political aims other than the party they were elected for. In March 2010 Speaker Leiʻataua invoked these laws to deprive three MPs of their seats for supporting Tautua Samoa.

He was re-elected at the 2011 and appointed Minister of Women's Affairs. He lost his seat at the 2016 election. He had initially planned to run in the 2021 election, but withdrew his candidacy in October 2020.

Leiʻataua died on 9 September 2026, at the age of 76.
