= Aiono Tile Gafa =

Samoan politician

Member of the Samoa Parliament for Aana Alofi No. 2
- In office 29 November 2021 – 29 August 2025
- Preceded by: Afaese Toleafoa
- Succeeded by: Alec Ekeroma

Member of Parliament for Aana Alofi No. 1
- In office 26 November 2004 – 4 March 2011
- Preceded by: Apule Pepe Metai
- Succeeded by: Tuitama Talalelei Tuitama

Personal details
- Party: Human Rights Protection Party

Aiono Fina'i Tile Gafa (born ~1961) is a former Samoan politician. He is a member of the Human Rights Protection Party.

Aiono was educated at Fasito'o-uta Primary School and Leulumoega Fou College. He lived in New Zealand and Australia, then returned to Samoa in the 1980s, where he worked for the Peace Corps.

He was first elected to the Legislative Assembly of Samoa in the 2004 A'ana Alofi No 1 By-election. He was re-elected at the 2006 election. He lost his seat at the 2011 election. He stood unsuccessfully at the 2016 election, after which he lodged an electoral petition alleging corruption and bribery against Speaker of the House Leaupepe Toleafoa Faafisi. The petition was later withdrawn. He unsuccessfully contested the 2021 election.

He was re-elected to Parliament in the 2021 Samoan by-elections, winning by just 19 votes. He was not re-elected in the 2025 Samoan general election.
