= Sala Fata Pinati =

Samoan politician

Minister of Tourism
- In office 30 June 2016 – 24 May 2021
- Prime Minister: Tuilaepa Aiono Sailele Malielegaoi
- Preceded by: Lautafi Fio Selafi Purcell
- Succeeded by: Fiamē Naomi Mataʻafa

Minister of Police
- In office 21 March 2011 – 25 November 2016
- Preceded by: Toleafoa Apulu Faafisi
- Succeeded by: Tuilaepa Aiono Sailele Malielegaoi

Minister of Prisons
- In office 21 March 2011 – 30 June 2016
- Preceded by: Toleafoa Apulu Faafisi
- Succeeded by: Tialavea Tionisio Hunt

Member of the Samoa Parliament for Sagaga No. 3
- In office 9 April 2021 – 29 August 2025
- Preceded by: None (seat created)
- Succeeded by: Sala Paulo Tuala Poto

Member of the Samoa Parliament for Gagaemauga No. 1
- In office 31 March 2006 – 9 April 2021
- Preceded by: Tuala Ainiu Iusitino
- Succeeded by: Tuala Iosefo Ponifasio

Personal details
- Party: Human Rights Protection Party

Sala Fata Pinati is a Samoan politician and former Cabinet Minister. He is a member of the Human Rights Protection Party.

== Career ==
Pinati was previously a member of the board of the Development Bank of Samoa. He was first elected to the Legislative Assembly of Samoa at the 2006 Samoan general election, and appointed Associate Minister of Agriculture. In 2007, he became Associate Minister of Education, and then from 2008 - 2010 he served as Associate Minister of Finance. Following the 2011 election he was prosecuted for bribery, but the charge was later dropped. In March 2011 he was appointed to Cabinet as Minister of Police and Prisons. During this term he separated management of prisons from the police, establishing an independent Samoa Prisons and Corrections Services.

He was re-elected at the 2016 election, and retained his position as Minister of Police and Prisons. Following the election, he was again prosecuted for bribery, but the charge was again withdrawn. A Cabinet reshuffle in June 2016 saw him lose his Prisons portfolio to Tialavea Tionisio Hunt, instead becoming Minister of Tourism and the Public Trust Office. A further reshuffle in November 2016 saw him lose his Police portfolio to Prime Minister Tuilaepa Aiono Sailele Malielegaoi and pick up responsibility for the Audit Office and Bureau of Statistics.

He ran in the newly created Sagaga No. 3 electorate at the 2021 election and was elected. He did not run at the 2025 election.
