= Faamoetauloa Ulaitino Faale Tumaalii =

Samoan politician (c.1949–2019)

Fa'amoetauloa Ulaitino Faale Tumaali'i
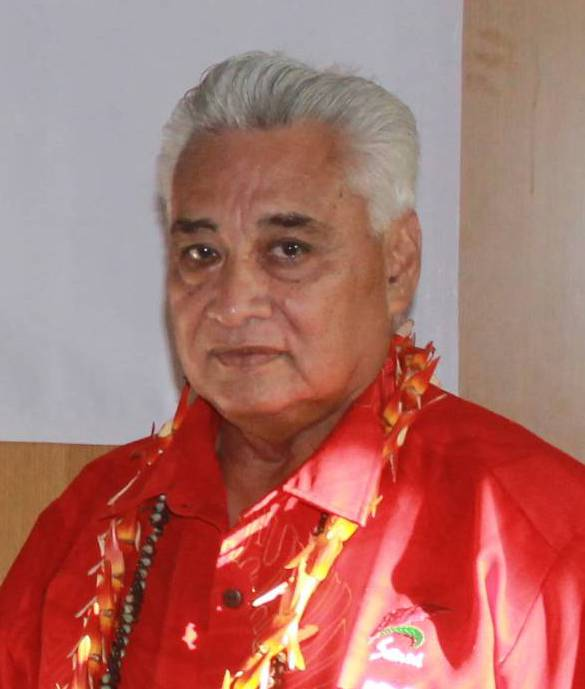
- Tumaali'i in 2013

Minister of Natural Resources and Environment
- In office 21 March 2011 – 19 March 2016
- Prime Minister: Tuila'epa Sa'ilele Malielegaoi
- Preceded by: Faumuina Tiatia Liuga
- Succeeded by: Fiamē Naomi Mataʻafa

Member of the Samoan Parliament for Gaga'emauga No. 3
- In office 4 March 2011 – 4 March 2016
- Preceded by: Galuvao Viliamu Sepulona
- Succeeded by: Nafoitoa Talaimanu Keti

Personal details
- Party: Human Rights Protection Party

Fa'amoetauloa Lealaiauloto Taito Dr. Faale Tumaali'i (~1949 - 16 September 2019) was a Samoan politician and Cabinet Minister. He was a member of the Human Rights Protection Party.

Tumaali'i studied for a bachelor's degree in Fiji, and then for a master's degree and PhD at the University of New South Wales. He worked for the Ministry of Agriculture, the New South Wales Agricultural Research Institute, the Australian Defence Science and Technology Organisation, as a lecturer at the University of Newcastle in Australia. After returning to Samoa in 2006 he became director of the Science Research Organisation of Samoa.

He was elected to the Legislative Assembly of Samoa at the 2011 Samoan general election, and appointed Minister of Natural Resources and Environment. He lost his seat in the 2016 election.
