= Lautafi Fio Selafi Purcell =

Samoan politician

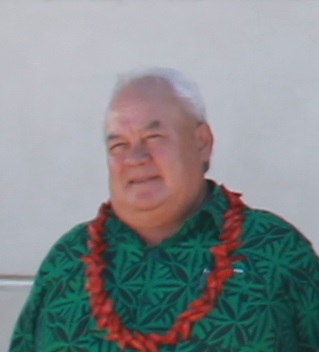
- Purcell in 2018

Minister of Labour, Industry and Commerce
- In office 18 March 2016 – 24 May 2021 (Note: Disputed 24 May — 23 July 2021)
- Prime Minister: Tuila'epa Sa'ilele Malielegaoi
- Preceded by: Fonotoe Pierre Lauofo
- Succeeded by: Faumuina Asi Pauli Wayne Fong

Minister of Public Enterprises
- In office 26 April 2014 – 24 May 2021
- Preceded by: Position established
- Succeeded by: Faumuina Asi Pauli Wayne Fong

Minister of Tourism
- In office 18 March 2016 – 30 June 2016
- Preceded by: Tuila'epa Sa'ilele Malielegaoi
- Succeeded by: Sala Fata Pinati

Member of the Samoan Parliament for Satupaitea
- Incumbent
- Assumed office 2 August 2011
- Preceded by: Asiata Sale'imoa Va'ai

Personal details
- Party: Human Rights Protection Party

Lautafi Fio Selafi Joseph Purcell is a Samoan politician and former Cabinet Minister. He is a member of the Human Rights Protection Party.

Purcell was educated at Chanel College, Moamoa and St Paul's College, Auckland as well as Victoria University of Wellington in New Zealand. He subsequently worked as a prison manager, prison inspector and policy advisor for the New Zealand Department of Justice and Department of Corrections.

Purcell was first elected to the Legislative Assembly of Samoa in a 2011 by-election, and appointed Associate Minister of Agriculture and Fisheries. Following a Cabinet reshuffle in April 2014 he was appointed as the first Minister of Public Enterprises.

He was re-elected unopposed at the 2016 Samoan general election and appointed Minister of Labour, Tourism and Samoa Land Corporation, as well as retaining his Government Enterprises portfolio. Another reshuffle in June 2016 saw him lose the Tourism portfolio to Sala Fata Pinati but retain Labour, Commerce, and Government Enterprises.

He is married to public servant Lematua Gisa Fuatai Purcell.
