= Maualaivao Pat Ah Him =

Samoan politician

Member of the Samoa Parliament for Individual voters
- In office 4 March 2011 – 4 March 2016
- Preceded by: Hans Joachim Keil III
- Succeeded by: None (Seat disestablished)

Personal details
- Party: Human Rights Protection Party

Maualaivao Patelesio Ah Him (born ~1950) is a Samoan politician and former member of the Legislative Assembly of Samoa. He is a member of the Human Rights Protection Party. He is the older brother of Muagututagata Peter Ah Him.

Maualaivao is a businessman. He was first elected to the Legislative Assembly in the 2011 Samoan general election. Elected as an independent, he immediately joined the Human Rights Protection Party and was appointed Associate Minister of Health. In parliament he unsuccessfully opposed the disestablishement of the individual voters seat. At the 2016 election he contested the newly created constituency of Urban West, losing to Faumuina Asi Pauli Wayne Fong. He subsequently took an election petition against Fong.

In October 2018 he was one of a group of chiefs charged with contempt of court for bestowing the Malietoa title in violation of a court order.

He contested the Sagaga no.2 seat in the 2021 election as an independent, losing to Seiuli Ueligitone Seiuli. An election petition bought against Seiuli resulted in both him and Maualaivao being found guilty of bribery and treating and banned from office for 15 years.

In September 2020 he lodged a complaint with police against Deputy Ombudsman Maualaivao Pepe Seuli over a heated verbal exchange during a village council meeting. Police initially refused to investigate, but in October 2021 charged Maualaivao Pepe Seuli with using insulting words. In December 2021 he lodged a complaint with police alleging that former prime Minister Tuila'epa Sa'ilele Malielegaoi, police commissioner Fuiavailili Egon Keil, and Attorney-General Savalenoa Mareva Betham Annandale has conspired to defeat the course of justice in the handling of his complaint against Seuli.
