= Taua Kitiona Seuala =

Samoan politician (died 2013)

Minister of Agriculture
- In office 24 April 2006 – 21 March 2011
- Prime Minister: Tuila'epa Sa'ilele Malielegaoi
- Preceded by: Tuisugaletaua Sofara Aveau
- Succeeded by: Le Mamea Ropati

Member of the Samoan Parliament for Aleipata Itupa I Luga
- In office 26 April 1996 – 16 May 2011
- Preceded by: Toomalatai Lauvai II
- Succeeded by: Amituanai Fagaivalu Kenrick Samu

Personal details
- Died: April 2013 Australia
- Party: Human Rights Protection Party

Taua Tavaga Kitiona Seuala (died April 2013) was a Samoan politician and Cabinet Minister. He was a member of the Human Rights Protection Party.

Taua was first elected to the Legislative Assembly of Samoa in the 1996 election. he was re-elected in 2001 election. After being re-elected at the 2006 election he was appointed Minister of Agriculture. In November 2009 it was alleged that aid following the 2009 Samoa earthquake and tsunami was being directed to Taua's constituency at the expense of others.

He was re-elected at the 2011 election but not reappointed to Cabinet. His election was voided following an election petition, which found he had engaged in bribery and treating, resulting in a by-election. He subsequently pleaded guilty to three criminal charges of bribery, and was fined US$1000.
