= Tuitama =

Tuitama is both a given name and a surname. Notable people with the name include:

- Tuitama Talalelei Tuitama, Samoan politician
- Willie Tuitama (born 1987), American football player
