= Tupuola =

Tupuola is a surname. Notable people with the surname include:

- Marcus Tupuola (born 1995), American rugby union player
- Tusa Misi Tupuola (died 2024), Samoan politician
