= Tuisugaletaua Sofara Aveau =

Samoan politician (1952/1953–2024)

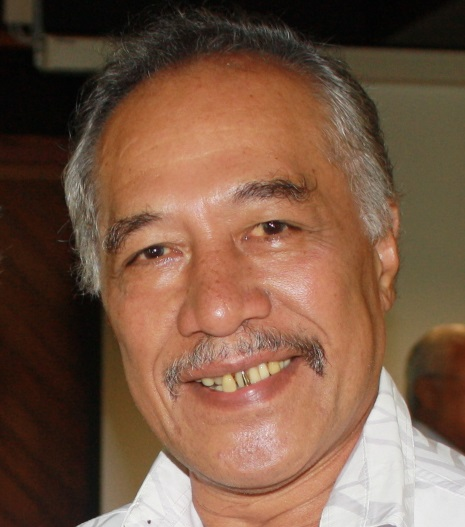
- Tuisugaletaua Sofara Aveau in 2014

Minister of Communications, Information and Technology
- In office 21 March 2011 – 18 March 2016
- Prime Minister: Tuilaepa Aiono Sailele Malielegaoi
- Preceded by: Safuneitu'uga Pa'aga Neri
- Succeeded by: Afamasaga Rico Tupai

Minister of Works, Transport and Infrastructure
- In office 24 April 2006 – 21 March 2011
- Preceded by: Faumuina Tiatia Liuga
- Succeeded by: Manu'alesagalala Enokati Posala

Minister of Agriculture
- In office 20 March 2001 – 24 April 2006
- Preceded by: Va'ai Papu Vailupe
- Succeeded by: Taua Kitiona Seuala

Member of the Samoa Parliament for Vaimauga East
- In office 2 March 2001 – 4 March 2016
- Preceded by: Lenui Avamagalo
- Succeeded by: Sulamanaia Tauiliili Tuivasa

Personal details
- Born: 1952/1953 Territory of Western Samoa
- Died: 27 March 2024 (aged 71) Samoa
- Party: Human Rights Protection Party

Tuisugaletaua Sofara Aveau (1952/1953 – 27 March 2024) was a Samoan politician and cabinet minister.

== Biography ==
Born in 1952/1953, Aveau was a musician. He was first elected to the Legislative Assembly of Samoa in the 2001 election, and was appointed Minister of Agriculture. He was re-elected in the 2006 election and appointed Minister of Works, Transport and Infrastructure. As Minister of Transport he spearheaded the government campaign to change Samoa from left-hand to right-hand driving.

Following the 2011 election he stood unsuccessfully for Deputy leader of the HRPP. He was subsequently appointed Minister of Communications, Information and Technology. In November 2011 he was investigated for assault by police; the complaint was later withdrawn. In 2014 he and his wife composed the theme song for the United Nations Third International Conference on Small Island Developing States.

Aveau lost his seat in the 2016 election. Following his election loss he established the Samoa Banana Farmers Association. He contested the 2021 election as an HRPP candidate, but was unsuccessful.

Aveu died on 27 March 2024, at the age of 71.
