= Loau Keneti Sio =

Samoan politician

Loau Solamalemalu Keneti Sio
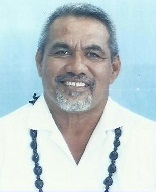
- Sio in 2016

Minister of Education, Sports and Culture
- In office 18 March 2016 – 24 May 2021 (Note: Disputed: 24 May – 23 July 2021)
- Prime Minister: Tuilaʻepa Saʻilele Malielegaoi
- Preceded by: Magele Mauiliu Magele
- Succeeded by: Seuula Ioane

Member of the Samoan Parliament
- Incumbent
- Assumed office 9 April 2021
- Preceded by: Constituency established
- Constituency: Sagaga 1
- In office 4 March 2016 – 9 April 2021
- Preceded by: Tuisa Tasi Patea
- Succeeded by: Constituency abolished
- Constituency: Sagaga le Falefa
- In office 31 March 2006 – 4 March 2011
- Preceded by: Patea Satini Epati
- Succeeded by: Tuisa Tasi Patea
- Constituency: Sagaga le Falefa

Personal details
- Born: 3 April 1964 (age 62) Apia, Samoa
- Party: Human Rights Protection Party
- Spouse: Malama Sio
- Children: 4
- Occupation: Flight attendant

Rugby union career
- Position: Centre
Senior career
Years	Team	Apps	(Points)
1988-1994	SCOPA		
International career
Years	Team	Apps	(Points)
1988-1994	Samoa	14	(12)

Loau Solamalemalo Keneti Sio (born Apia, 3 April 1964) is a Samoan politician, former Cabinet Minister, and rugby union player. He is a member of the Human Rights Protection Party (HRPP).

== Early life ==
Loau was educated at Faleula Primary School before studying at Samoa College. He worked in a bank and as a farmer and fisherman. Outside of the field, he worked as a flight attendant.

== Rugby career ==
His first cap for Samoa was against Tonga, at Apia, on 26 May 1988 and his last international cap was against Tonga, at Moamoa, on 4 June 1994. Loau represented Samoa for a total of 12 years, including at the 1991 and 1995 Rugby World Cup tournaments, though he did not take part at both tournaments.

== Political career ==
Loau was first elected to the Legislative Assembly of Samoa as an independent at the 2006 Samoan general election. He joined the HRPP and was appointed Associate Minister of Education. In November 2009 he was charged with threatening to kill over a shooting incident in the village of Faleula; the charge was dismissed in 2010. He subsequently lost his seat in the 2011 election.

Loau was re-elected in 2016 and appointed Minister of Education, Sports and Culture. As Minister of Education he unsuccessfully attempted to reintroduce corporal punishment in schools, and opposed sex education. In July 2019, the New Zealand transgender weightlifter Laurel Hubbard was awarded two gold medals at the 2019 Pacific Games which were held in Samoa. Loau, speaking as the Samoa 2019 chairman, said that the decision to allow Hubbard to compete was "unfair" and added that "We all know that it is not fair to the women lifters but that is a reality we face in the world of sports".

Loau was re-elected in the 2021 Samoan general election. On 12 July 2021 he agreed to resign as part of the settlement of an election petition. On 20 July the agreement was rescinded, and the petition proceeded to trial. Loau successfully retained his seat.

Following the 2021 Samoan by-elections Loau publicly called for Tuila'epa and other HRPP senior leaders to step aside.

He was re-elected at the 2025 election.

== Personal life ==
Loau is married to Malama Sio and they have four children. He is a member of the Congregational Christian Church and the Catholic Church in Faleula.

In June 2024 Loau and his wife were charged with assault, making threats, and being armed by Samoan police following a family dispute.

== Notes ==
Legislative Assembly of Samoa
Preceded by Patea Satini Epati	Member of Parliament for Sagaga le Falefa; 2006–2011	Succeeded by Tuisa Tasi Patea
Preceded by Tuisa Tasi Patea	Member of Parliament for Sagaga le Falefa; 2016–2021	Constituency abolished
New constituency	Member of Parliament for Sagaga 1; 2021–present	Incumbent
Political offices
Preceded by Magele Mauiliu Magele	Minister of Education, Sports and Culture; 2016–2021	Succeeded by Seuula Ioane
