= Lenatai Victor Tamapua =

Samoan politician

Member of the Samoa Parliament for Vaimauga No. 2
- Incumbent
- Assumed office 4 March 2011
- Preceded by: Anauli Pofitu Fesili

Personal details
- Party: Human Rights Protection Party

Lenatai Victor Faafoi Tamapua is a Samoan politician. He is a member of the Human Rights Protection Party.

Tamapua was first elected to the Legislative Assembly of Samoa in the 2011 election. He was reelected at the 2016 election. In March 2016 he was appointed Associate Minister of Justice and Courts Administration. In November 2017 a cabinet reshuffle saw him switch portfolios with Associate Minister for Revenue, Prisons and Correction Services So’oalo Mene.

In January 2019 Tamapua was awarded the title of Fuimaono by his village.

He was re-elected in the 2021 election and again at the 2025 election.
