= Tuala Iosefo Ponifasio =

Samoan politician

The Honourable Afioga Tuala Iosefo Ponifasio
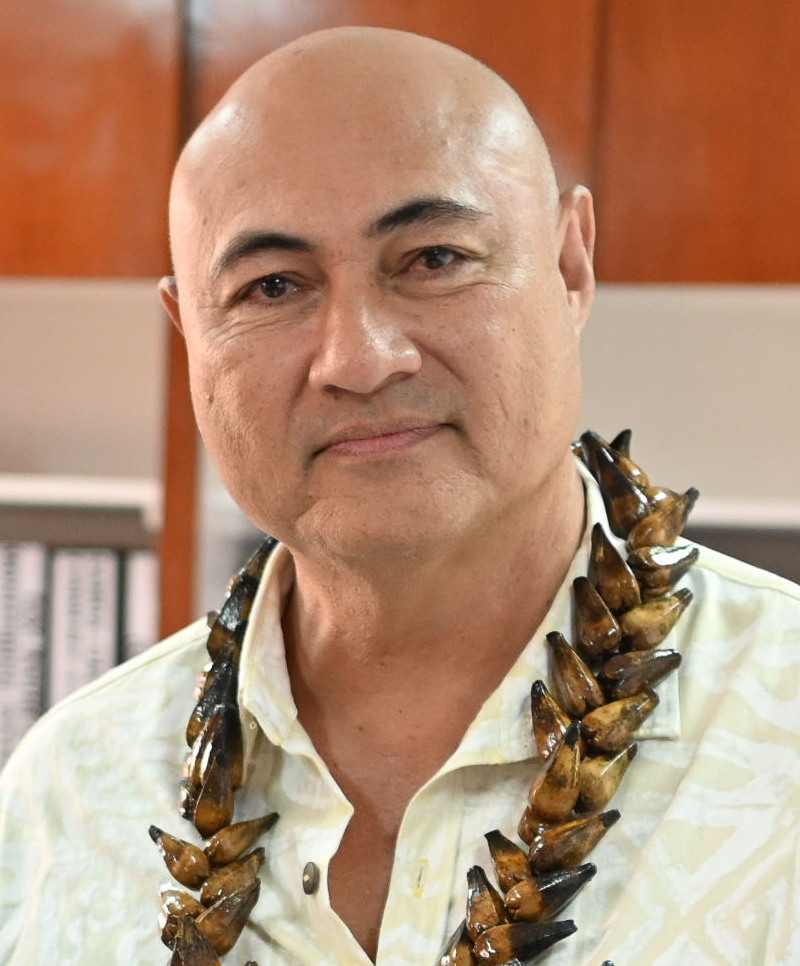
- Ponifasio in 2022

Deputy Prime Minister of Samoa
- In office 24 May 2021 – 16 September 2025 (Note: Disputed: 24 May 2021 – 23 July 2021)
- Prime Minister: Fiamē Naomi Mataʻafa
- Preceded by: Fiamē Naomi Mataʻafa
- Succeeded by: Toelupe Poumulinuku Onesemo

Minister of Customs and Revenue
- In office 24 May 2021 – 16 September 2025
- Prime Minister: Fiamē Naomi Mata‘afa
- Preceded by: Tialavea Tionisio Hunt
- Succeeded by: Masinalupe Makesi Pisi

Member of the Samoan Parliament for Gagaʻemauga No. 1
- In office 9 April 2021 – 3 June 2025
- Preceded by: Sala Fata Pinati
- Succeeded by: Vaʻaaoao Salumalo Alofipo

Personal details
- Party: Samoa Uniting Party (since 2025)
- Other political affiliations: Independent (until 2021); Faʻatuatua i le Atua Samoa ua Tasi (2021–2025)
- Education: Victoria University of Wellington; University of Auckland

Military service
- Allegiance: New Zealand
- Branch/service: Royal New Zealand Army
- Years of service: 1983-87 - 2004–2008

Afioga Tuala Tevaga Iosefo Ponifasio is a Samoan politician and lawyer who served as the deputy prime minister of Samoa from 2021 to 2025. Elected to parliament as an independent, Ponifasio became kingmaker following the 2021 election and later joined the Faʻatuatua i le Atua Samoa ua Tasi (FAST) party.

Ponifasio was removed from FAST in 2025, along with Prime Minister Fiamē Naomi Mata‘afa and three other cabinet ministers. Ponifasio and the expelled ministers, denounced the expulsion as unlawful and initially claimed they were FAST members. After Mata‘afa called a snap election following parliament's rejection of the government budget on 27 May, Ponifasio, along with the rest of cabinet, confirmed they had left FAST and joined Mata‘afa's Samoa Uniting Party (SUP). Ponifasio lost re-election in his seat of Gagaʻemauga No. 1 at the 2025 snap election.

== Early life ==
Ponifasio is the eighth of ten children, born to Samoan catechists - Ponifasio Fune Ah Tani and Gafaomalietoa Telesia Mann. He attended St. Joseph's Primary School, Leauvaʻa, Marist Brother’s School, Mulivai, St Peter Chanel College, Moamoa and Bishop Viard College in Porirua, New Zealand. Tuala is an ex-serviceman of the Royal New Zealand Army and is currently the President of the Royal Samoa Returned Serviceman Association. He is married with two children and is a member of the Catholic Church.

== Education ==
Ponifasio is a law graduate of Victoria University of Wellington, studied tertiary teaching at Auckland University of Technology, and gained a Masters in Business Administration from the Auckland Institute of Studies and Arts Administration at the University of Auckland. Ponifasio works as a lawyer and operates a hotel business in Apia.

== Political Life ==
Ponifasio has contested every Samoan election since 2006. Following the 2011 election he sued Samoa's TV3 for libel over a news story broadcast before the election. Following the 2016 election he was banished from his village for filing an electoral petition against the successful candidate, Sala Fata Pinati. He was subsequently convicted in 2017 of bribery and treating in a private prosecution launched by voters in the electorate, but the conviction was quashed on appeal in 2019. In September 2020 he launched a legal challenge to changes to the Electoral Act which would have advantaged incumbents and disadvantaged challengers, but dropped it when the government agreed to amend the Act.

=== 2021 general election ===
Ponifasio won the Gagaʻemauga No. 1 seat as an independent in the 2021 election, giving him the balance of power between the Human Rights Protection Party (HRPP) and FAST. On 21 April, after the HRPP's Tuilaʻepa Saʻilele Malielegaoi had refused a demand to step down, he announced he would join the FAST Party.

=== Deputy prime minister (2021–2025) ===
On 24 May 2021, Ponifasio was appointed as deputy prime minister and minister of customs and revenue in the elected cabinet of Samoa's first female prime minister, Hon. Fiamē Naomi Mata‘afa. The appointment was disputed by the caretaker government. On 23 July 2021 the Court of Appeal ruled that the swearing-in ceremony was constitutional and binding, and that FAST had been the government since 24 May.

In February 2022, Ponifasio fired his office assistant for the alleged theft of money. He subsequently announced that he would press charges.

On 15 January 2025 Ponifasio, Prime Minister Mataʻafa and three other cabinet ministers were expelled from FAST, following a power struggle between Mataʻafa and party chairman Laʻauli Leuatea Schmidt. Ponifasio and the other expelled members rejected their expulsion, denounced it as unconstitutional, and claimed they were still members of FAST. Prime Minister Mata‘afa called a snap election following the government's budget defeat in parliament on 27 May 2025. Following the dissolution of parliament, Ponifasio, Mata‘afa and the rest of cabinet confirmed their resignations from FAST and established the Samoa Uniting Party. During the 2025 election, Ponifasio lost his seat to FAST party Secretary Vaʻaaoao Salumalo Alofipo. His tenure as deputy prime minister ended on 16 September and he was succeeded by Toelupe Poumulinuku Onesemo.

== Notes ==
Legislative Assembly of Samoa
Preceded by Sala Fata Pinati	Member of Parliament for Gagaʻemauga No. 1; 2021–2025	Succeeded by Vaʻaaoao Salumalo Alofipo
Political offices
Vacant Title last held by Fiamē Naomi Mataʻafa	Deputy Prime Minister of Samoa; 2021–2025	Succeeded by Toelupe Poumulinuku Onesemo
Preceded by Tialavea Tionisio Hunt	Minister of Customs and Revenue; 2021–2025	Succeeded by Masinalupe Makesi Pisi
