= Tuitama Talalelei Tuitama =

Samoan politician

Minister of Women, Community and Social Development
- In office 27 April 2019 – 9 April 2021
- Prime Minister: Tuilaepa Sailele Malielegaoi
- Preceded by: Faimalotoa Kika Stowers
- Succeeded by: Leota Laki Lamositele

Minister of Health
- In office 21 March 2011 – 27 April 2019
- Preceded by: Gatoloaifaana Amataga Alesana-Gidlow
- Succeeded by: Faimalotoa Kika Stowers

Member of the Samoa Parliament for Aana Alofi No. 1 East
- In office 4 March 2011 – 9 April 2021
- Preceded by: Aiono Tile Gafa
- Succeeded by: Fesolai Apulu Tuigamala

Member of the Samoa Parliament for Va'a-O-Fonoti
- In office 2 March 2001 – 4 March 2011
- Preceded by: Molio'o Teofilo
- Succeeded by: Tialavea Fea Tionisio Seigafolava

Personal details
- Party: Human Rights Protection Party

Dr Tuitama Leao Talalelei Tuitama is a Samoan politician and former Cabinet Minister. He is a member of the Human Rights Protection Party.

== Personal life ==
Tuitama trained as a medical doctor, working at Samoa National Referral Hospital and in private practice. He served as the president of Samoa's GP's association.

He is married to Letelemalanuola Tuitama and is a member of the EFKS Church.

== Political career ==
He was first elected to Parliament in the 2001 Samoan general election, representing the seat of Va'a-O-Fonoti. He was re-elected in 2006, but had to defend an electoral petition accusing him of corrupt practices. He was subsequently appointed Associate Minister of Health, a position he held from 2006 to 2010.

At the 2011 election Tuitama shifted seat to A'ana Alofi No. 1, and after being elected was appointed Minister of Health. He was re-elected in the 2016 election, and retained his portfolio. As Health Minister he focused on non-communicable diseases, and oversaw a merger of health agencies.

In April 2019 he was replaced as Health Minister by Faimalotoa Kika Stowers in a cabinet reshuffle, taking up Stowers' portfolio of Women, Community and Social Development. In that role, he encouraged vaccination to combat the 2019 Samoa measles outbreak.

In October 2020 he decided not to stand at the April 2021 election.

In February 2021 he warned Samoa's village mayors that they must support the government or resign.
