= Tusa Misi Tupuola =

Samoan politician (died 2024)

Member of the Samoa Parliament for Falealili
- In office 4 March 2011 – 4 March 2016
- Preceded by: Fuimaono Naoia Tei
- Succeeded by: None (Seat split)

Personal details
- Died: April 2024
- Party: Human Rights Protection Party

Tusa Aiono Misi Tupuola (died April 2024) was a Samoan politician and member of the Legislative Assembly of Samoa. Tusa was a member of the Human Rights Protection Party.

Tusa worked as assistant chief executive, then secretary, of Samoa's Transport Control Board. He later worked for Samoa's Land Transport Authority.

Tusa was first elected to the Legislative Assembly in the 2011 Samoan general election and appointed Associate Minister for Transport and Infrastructure. He lost his seat in the 2016 election. He later contested the 2021 election.

Tusa died in April 2024.
