= Gatoloaifaana Amataga Alesana-Gidlow =

Samoan politician

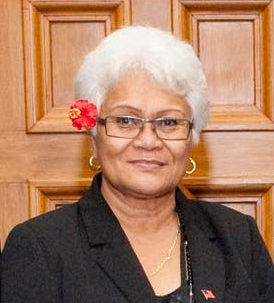
- Gatoloaifaana Amataga Alesana-Gidlow in 2013

Minister of Health
- In office 24 April 2006 – 21 March 2011
- Prime Minister: Tuilaepa Sailele Malielegaoi
- Preceded by: Mulitalo Siafausa Vui
- Succeeded by: Magele Sekati Fiaui

Member of the Samoa Parliament for Fa'asaleleaga No. 1
- In office 31 March 2006 – 9 April 2021
- Succeeded by: Matamua Vasati Pulufana

Personal details
- Party: Human Rights Protection Party

Gatoloaifaana Amataga Alesana-Gidlow is a Samoan politician and former Cabinet Minister. She is a member of the Human Rights Protection Party.

Gatoloaifaana is the daughter of former Prime Minister Tofilau Eti Alesana. She was first elected to the Legislative Assembly of Samoa in the 2006 Samoan general election, and appointed Minister of Health. As health minister she advanced legislation banning the sale of tobacco to young people. and managed an outbreak of Swine Flu. She was re-elected at the 2011 election, but not reappointed to Cabinet. In 2012 she supported constitutional amendments requiring that women hold a minimum of 10% of the seats in parliament. In August 2014 she appeared in court charged with one count of issuing insulting words; the charges were ultimately dropped. She was re-elected again at the 2016 election. She lost her seat in the April 2021 Samoan general election.

Gatoloaifaana is married to Rodger Gidlow and they own and run the Savaiian Hotel in Lalomalava on the north coast of Savai'i. She has also been a Director on the Board of the Samoa Tourism Authority. In 2017 she was appointed a judge of the Miss Pacific Islands Pageant.
