= Siusega =

- Village
- Location within Samoa
- Coordinates: 13°49′54″S 171°49′18″W
- Country: Samoa
- District: Tuamasaga

Population (2016)
  - Total: 2,618
- Time zone: -11

Siusega is a village in Samoa, on the island of Upolu. The village has a population of 2618.
