= Faimalotoa Kika Stowers =

Samoan politician

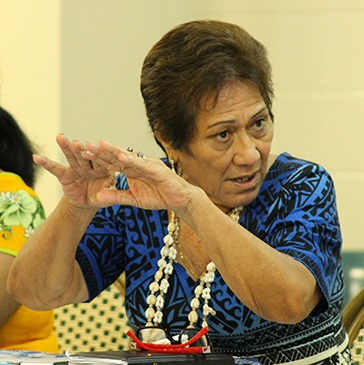
- Faimalotoa Kika Stowers in 2013

Minister of Health
- In office 27 April 2019 – 24 May 2021 (Note: Disputed: 24 May 2021 – 23 July 2021)
- Prime Minister: Tuila'epa Sa'ilele Malielegaoi
- Preceded by: Tuitama Talalelei Tuitama
- Succeeded by: Valasi Toogamaga Tafito

Minister for Women, Community & Social Development
- In office 18 March 2016 – 27 April 2019
- Preceded by: Tolofuaivalelei Falemoe Leiʻataua
- Succeeded by: Tuitama Talalelei Tuitama

Member of Parliament for Gagaifomauga No. 1
- Incumbent
- Assumed office 15 August 2014
- Preceded by: Tuilo'a Anitele'a Tuilo'a

Personal details
- Party: Human Rights Protection Party

Faimalotoa Kika Iemaima Stowers Ah Kau is a Samoan politician and former Cabinet Minister. She is a member of the Human Rights Protection Party.

Stowers was educated at St. Mary's College in Vaimoso, before becoming a broadcaster for Radio 2AP, where she worked from 1968 to 2003 and rose to become Director of Broadcasting. She was first elected to the Legislative Assembly of Samoa in a by-election in 2014. She was re-elected in the 2016 Samoan general election and appointed to Cabinet as Minister for Women Affairs and Social Development. In November 2017 she allegedly assaulted another member of her family, and prosecution was contemplated.

In April 2019 she was replaced as Minister of Women, Community and Social Development by Tuitama Talalelei Tuitama in a cabinet reshuffle, taking up Tuitama's portfolio of Health. As Minister of Health she led the response to the 2019 Samoa measles outbreak and to the COVID-19 pandemic.

Stowers was re-elected in the 2021 Samoan general election. She retired from politics at the 2025 election.
