= Tapuai Toese Ah Sam =

Samoan politician

Member of the Samoa Parliament for Salega
- In office 4 March 2011 – 4 March 2016
- Succeeded by: Olo Fiti Vaai

Personal details
- Party: Tautua Samoa Party

Tapuai Toese Ah Sam is a Samoan politician and former member of the Legislative Assembly of Samoa. He is a member of the Tautua Samoa Party.

He was elected to the Legislative Assembly in the 2011 Samoan general election. At the 2016 election the Salega seat was split. He stood in the Salega East constituency, but lost to Olo Fiti Vaai.

Following his retirement from politics he became a church pastor and moved overseas. In September 2022 he uploaded a video to YouTube in which he confessed to sexually abusing young girls.
