= Peseta Vaifou Tevaga =

Samoan politician

Member of the Samoa Parliament for Faasaleleaga No. 5
- In office 4 March 2011 – 29 August 2025
- Preceded by: Vui Tupe Ioane
- Succeeded by: Vui Iiga Sione Iiga

Personal details
- Party: Human Rights Protection Party

Peseta Vaifou Tevaga (also known as Peseta Vaifou Tevagaena) is a Samoan politician and Member of the Legislative Assembly of Samoa. He is a member of the Human Rights Protection Party.

Tevaga is a former policeman and runs a construction business. He was first elected to the Legislative Assembly of Samoa at the 2011 Samoan general election and appointed Associate Minister of Finance. In late 2011 he allegedly hit a disabled man while driving a government vehicle. He was subsequently charged with negligent driving causing injury, but this was subsequently upgraded to dangerous driving causing death after the victim died. The charge was dropped in August 2013 after key witnesses were unable to attend the hearing. In the interim he was sacked as Associate Finance Minister over concerns around conflicts of interest when tendering for government projects. In August 2014 he was arrested and charged with drunk-driving after an accident involving a government vehicle. In May 2015 he was convicted of dangerous driving over the incident and fined $100.

Tevaga was re-elected in the 2016 election and appointed Associate Minister for Prime Minister & Cabinet. In October 2015, shortly before the election, he began a long-running legal dispute with fellow MP Laauli Leuatea Polataivao over a business they were partners in. An investigation of his complaints by police resulted in Tevaga being charged with forgery and falsifying documents over a share-transfer form. The charges were dismissed in October 2016. In 2017 he commenced legal proceedings against Polataivao, accusing him of dishonesty in managing the company. The civil claim was dismissed in November 2017. Polataivao subsequently resigned from Cabinet after being charged with more than a hundred counts of forgery and theft; he was acquitted of all charges in June 2020.

In 2018 a company part-owned by Tevaga was awarded a $1.3 million contract to build an airport on Upolu. He denied any conflict of interest.

Tevaga was re-elected in the 2021 election.
