= Fonotoe Pierre Lauofo =

Samoan politician

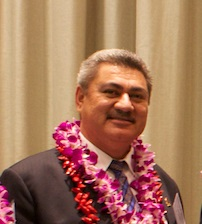
- Lauofo in 2011

Leader of the Opposition
- In office 27 January 2023 – 5 July 2023
- Prime Minister: Fiamē Naomi Mata‘afa
- Preceded by: Tuilaʻepa Saʻilele Malielegaoi
- Succeeded by: Tuilaʻepa Saʻilele Malielegaoi

Deputy Prime Minister of Samoa
- In office 21 March 2011 – 18 March 2016
- Prime Minister: Tuila‘epa Sa‘ilele Malielegaoi
- Preceded by: Misa Telefoni Retzlaff
- Succeeded by: Fiamē Naomi Mataʻafa

Minister of Trade, Labour, Industry and Commerce
- In office 21 March 2011 – 18 March 2016
- Prime Minister: Tuila‘epa Sa‘ilele Malielegaoi
- Preceded by: Misa Telefoni Retzlaff
- Succeeded by: Lautafi Fio Selafi Purcell

Member of the Samoan Parliament for Anoama‘a Sisifo
- Incumbent
- Assumed office 18 March 2005
- Preceded by: Tagaloa Sale Tagaloa

Personal details
- Party: Human Rights Protection Party

Fonotoe Nuafesili Pierre Lauofo Meredith is a Samoan politician who served as the leader of the opposition from January to July 2023. A former deputy prime minister, he is a member of the Human Rights Protection Party (HRPP).

Lauofo was first elected to the Legislative Assembly of Samoa in a by-election in 2005. He was re-elected in the 2006 Samoan general election.

He was re-elected unopposed at the 2011 election after the candidate from the opposition Tautua Samoa Party was declared ineligible, and appointed Deputy Prime Minister and Minister of Labour, Industry and Commerce. In January 2014 he was charged with obstructing police after instructing Associate Minister Muagututagata Peter Ah Him to drive away from a police breath test. In April 2014 he was convicted, and fined US$90. The conviction was overturned in 2017. In the intervening period Lauofo was re-elected in the 2016 election, but was not reappointed to Cabinet.

Lauofo was re-elected at the 2021 election. Following the election, he was elected HRPP deputy leader.

On 27 January 2023, parliament elected Fonotoe as opposition leader, succeeding Tuila‘epa Sa‘ilele Malielegaoi whose tenure was terminated due to his suspension from the legislature. After the suspension was ruled unconstitutional by the Supreme Court, Tuila‘epa again became opposition leader.

Fonotoe was re-elected in the 2025 election.

In March 2026 the FAST government convened a special parliamentary committee to investigate Fonotoe, Tuila‘epa, and HRPP secretary Lealaʻilepule Rimoni Aiafi on allegations of treason and defamation over the 2021 Samoan constitutional crisis and more recent statements criticising the government. In October 2026 Fonotoe was suspended from parliament for 24 hours for criticising the process in an online interview.

Political offices
Preceded by Misa Telefoni Retzlaff	Deputy Prime Minister of Samoa; 2011–2016	Succeeded by Fiamē Naomi Mataʻafa
Preceded by Misa Telefoni Retzlaff	Minister of Trade, Labour, Industry and Commerce; 2011–2016	Succeeded by Lautafi Fio Selafi Purcell
Vacant Title last held by A'eau Peniamina	Deputy Leader of the Opposition; 2021–present	Incumbent
Preceded by Tuilaʻepa Saʻilele Malielegaoi	Leader of the Opposition; 2023	Succeeded by Tuilaʻepa Saʻilele Malielegaoi
Party political offices
Preceded by Misa Telefoni Retzlaff	Deputy Leader of the Human Rights Protection Party; 2011–2016	Succeeded by Fiamē Naomi Mata‘afa
Preceded by Fiamē Naomi Mata‘afa	Deputy Leader of the Human Rights Protection Party; 2021–present	Incumbent
