= 2011 Samoan general election =

- 4 March 2011

All 49 seats in the Legislative Assembly 25 seats needed for a majority
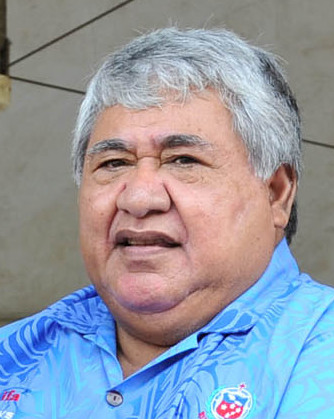
	First party	Second party
		Tautua
Leader	Tuilaʻepa Saʻilele Malielegaoi	Vaʻai Papu Vailupe
Party	HRPP	TSP
Last election	50.20%, 33 seats	–
Seats won	29	13
Seat change	▼4	New
Popular vote	48,771	21,692
Percentage	55.56%	24.71%
Swing	▲5.36 pp	New
- Results by constituency
Prime Minister before election
Tuilaʻepa Saʻilele Malielegaoi
HRPP
Subsequent Prime Minister
Tuilaʻepa Saʻilele Malielegaoi
HRPP

General elections were held in Samoa on 4 March 2011, to determine the composition of the 15th Parliament. Two parties contested the election, the ruling Human Rights Protection Party (HRPP), which had been in power for most of the time since 1982, led by Prime Minister Tuilaʻepa Saʻilele Malielegaoi and the newly founded Tautua Samoa Party (TSP) led by Vaʻai Papu Vailupe, which several minor parties had merged into. The election occurred following amendments to the electoral act in 2009, including the introduction of the Monotoga law, a requirement for aspiring candidates to dedicate traditional village service and commitments. As a result, three TSP aspiring candidates, including a challenger for the prime minister's seat, were disqualified by the Supreme Court for failing to satisfy this law.

The HRPP won re-election with a majority of 29 seats, while three cabinet ministers were unseated. The TSP secured 13 seats and independents won seven. Only two of the seven female candidates were successful. Following the election, all the independents joined the HRPP, handing the party a two-thirds majority with 36 seats. Several successful candidates were later stripped of their seats by the Supreme Court due to electoral petitions, which included the TSP leader. As a result, the TSP replaced Vaʻai Papu Vailupe with Deputy Leader Palusalue Faʻapo II.

== Background ==
During the previous general election held in 2006, the ruling Human Rights Protection Party won a landslide victory, winning 33 seats. The opposition Samoan Democratic United Party (SDUP) secured ten seats, and independents won the remaining six. The SDUP later lost one seat due to an electoral petition. Later that year, in August 2006, the SDUP removed its leader, Le Mamea Ropati, and replaced him with Deputy Leader Asiata Saleʻimoa Vaʻai. The SDUP then fragmented and led to the departure of two MPs from the party, including Le Mamea Ropati. As a result, the SDUP's recognition as a parliamentary party ceased because it fell below the eight-seat threshold, and the parliament classified the party's remaining MPs as independents.

On 11 May 2007, long-serving O le Ao o le Malo (head of state) Susuga Malietoa Tanumafili II died. Parliament unanimously voted for Tui Ātua Tupua Tamasese Efi, a member of the Council of Deputies, former prime minister and son of former Co-Head of State Tupua Tamasese Meaʻole, to succeed Malietoa.

In September 2009, the government switched the country from right to left-hand driving to enable less costly vehicle imports from Australia and New Zealand. The change was controversial as most vehicles were on the left-hand drive, generating one of the largest protests in Samoan history. The same month, Samoa was devastated by an earthquake and tsunami that claimed the lives of 158 people in the country. The prime minister faced criticism for allegedly mishandling relief funds.

Eleven opposition MPs from the SDUP and independents formed the Tautua Samoa Party in 2008 to provide parliamentary opposition to the HRPP. Nine members of parliament subsequently aligned themselves with the new party. However, in 2009, speaker of parliament, Tolofuaivalelei Falemoe Leiʻataua, declared their seats vacant and ordered by-elections to take place. The speaker argued the TSP members had broken parliamentary protocol by joining a new party during the legislative session. But the Supreme Court later ruled the speaker's decision to be unlawful, cancelling the by-elections and restoring the TSP MPs. The following year, parliament passed an amendment forbidding MPs from changing parties; those who would change their affiliation would have to run in a by-election to retain their seat. After the amendment's passage, only three MPs remained official TSP members and competed in subsequent by-elections; one member successfully retained his seat unopposed, while another secured a narrow win. Former Party Chair Lealailepule Rimoni Aiafi was narrowly defeated by an HRPP member. In September 2010, the Samoa Party merged into the TSP. Feo Nemaia Esau, the Samoa Party's president, said the purpose of the merger was to strengthen the opposition. The TSP initially intended to refrain from electing a party leader until after the election to choose one of the successful parliamentary candidates. However, this prompted Prime Minister Malielegaoi to describe the TSP as a "headless monster" and he challenged the party to select a leader before the election. The party subsequently elected Vaʻai Papu Vailupe, son of former prime minister Vaʻai Kolone, as leader in December 2010.

== Electoral system ==
During the time of the 2011 election, parliament was composed of 49 members, with all serving a five-year term. Forty-seven members represented forty-one village-based constituencies, of which six of the larger electorates had two MPs, while the rest were single-member constituencies. Two members, elected from a nationwide constituency, represented individual voters, mostly non-ethnic Samoans and individuals with partial Samoan ancestry. Except for the latter, to qualify, candidates were required to hold a matai title, while all were elected using the first-past-the-post voting system. Candidates were also required to have reached the age of 21 and have resided in Samoa for at least three years before the nomination date. In 2009, parliament amended the electoral act to include the monotoga law, a requirement for individuals to dedicate service to their respective villages to qualify as candidates. Under the monotoga law, a requirement for parliamentary hopefuls to qualify as candidates was for their village mayors to approve their nomination.

=== Voters ===
Universal suffrage was introduced in 1991, permitting all Samoan citizens over the age of 21 to vote in person. Voting registration usually closes six months before a general election and re-opens immediately after. Voters could elect to enrol in a constituency rather than the one where they reside by right of significant family ties or matai titles. As a result, the population of constituencies and the constituency's voter roll have not always correlated. Voters residing in Apia that were registered to vote in constituencies outside the capital but were unable to travel to their electoral districts on election day were permitted to cast a special vote at designated polling stations.

==== Eastern Samoans ====
Before the election, the electoral commissioner of American Samoa announced that American Samoans who cast ballots in elections held in the Independent State of Samoa would subsequently be ineligible to vote in their own country. Under United States electoral laws, voters can lose their right to vote if they cast a ballot in another country's election.

== Schedule ==
Prime Minister Malielegaoi announced the election date on 5 October 2010. The 14th Parliament was dissolved on 27 January 2011, while candidates could register from 18 to 25 February. The campaign season ended on 3 March, and the mandatory removal of campaign material from public areas occurred. Election Day and the day prior were declared public holidays by the government to allow voters to travel to their electoral districts if need be. The return of the writ occurred on 21 March.

Date	Event
4 November 2010	Registration for voters closes
27 January 2011	The 14th Parliament is dissolved
18 February 2011	Nomination for candidates opens
25 February 2011	Candidate registration and withdrawal deadline
3 March 2011	Conclusion of campaigning, mandatory removal of campaign material from public areas
4 March 2011	Election Day
7 March 2011	Special votes are counted
8–14 March 2011	Official count
21 March 2011	Official results are announced and the writs are returned

== Parties and candidates ==
A total of 159 candidates competed in the election, and two parties contested; the ruling HRPP, led by Prime Minister Tuilaʻepa Saʻilele Malielegaoi, and the TSP, led by Vaʻai Papu Vailupe. Of the HRPP candidates nominated, 79 contested, while there were 40 TSP and Independent candidates each. Seven contenders were women, down from 19 in the 2006 election. As four constituencies consisted solely of HRPP candidates, while two had members of the ruling party running unopposed, the HRPP was guaranteed six seats.

Party	Leader	Candidates	Founded	2006 seats
Human Rights Protection Party	Tuilaʻepa Saʻilele Malielegaoi	79	1979	33 / 49
Tautua Samoa Party	Vaʻai Papu Vailupe	40	2008	—N/a
Independents	—N/a	40	—N/a	6 / 49

=== Disqualified candidates ===
Several parliamentary hopefuls either withdrew or had their candidacy revoked. In December 2010, veteran politician Tuilagi Motutoa Vavae Leo II, a former deputy speaker and HRPP candidate, was convicted by the Supreme Court of attempted sexual assault, terminating his campaign.

A month before the election, the electoral commissioner disqualified three TSP candidates. The mayors in their respective villages had refused to sign their nomination forms due to their supposed failure to satisfy the monotoga law. One of the disqualified candidates, Tu‘ula Tuitui of the Saleapaga village, who was vying for the prime minister's seat, stated he had provided proof to the mayor that he had worked for the village in various ways, notably by taking part in recovery work after the 2009 earthquake and tsunami. Tuitui also claimed that chiefs and orators of Saleapaga had repeatedly requested he not run against the prime minister. The three TSP rejects unsuccessfully challenged their disqualifications in court. TSP founder Lealailepule Rimoni Aiafi criticised the disqualifications and emphasised how no HRPP candidates were affected. However, he also highlighted that the TSP declined to have any candidates from the ruling party disqualified, expressing, "we believe that anybody can run, [and] exercise their right to compete in the election."

=== Public servants ===
Shortly before the poll, a cabinet directive ordered public servants running for Parliament to resign in contravention of Samoa's electoral act, which permits public servants to take special leave to contest elections. The TSP denounced the order as unconstitutional.

== Campaign ==
The HRPP, which had governed Samoa for most of the time since 1982, promised to focus on health, education, agriculture, infrastructural development, the development of renewable energy, and a pledge to "turn Samoa into the sports hub of the Pacific". In a speech on 22 February, the Prime Minister emphasised the party's maturity and experience in government. He promised continuity in policies and drew attention to what he described as the government's major achievements in recent years: the election of the head of state; the development of infrastructure; economic growth, and the development of businesses and the private sector; a well-managed budget; the hosting of the 2007 South Pacific Games; the switching from right- to left-hand driving throughout the country and the government's response to the 2009 earthquake and tsunami. For the future, the prime minister announced a broad range of policies to improve Samoans' health, including an increase in the number of locally trained medical staff, an increase in the number of hospitals, a policy of compulsory twice-a-year testing of all Samoans to detect cancer in advance, and the promotion of organic farming, along with a "bonus scheme" to reduce the use of chemicals and pesticides in agriculture, to facilitate healthier diets. He stated that these promises could all be realistically financed and concluded: "Your one vote can set the direction of Samoa for the next five years. It’s very important who you choose because you could benefit or you will bring a curse on you and your family for the next five years. So vote for the HRPP and be blessed". Malielegaoi predicted that the HRPP would win 40 seats. Days before the election, the prime minister promised to step down at the next election if his party remained in government.

The TSP promised to focus on lowering the cost of living and halting the government's Casino and Gambling Bill, which would legalise casino gaming in the country. The Value Added Goods and Services Tax would be abolished; pensions would be raised for the elderly; children below the age of 12 would receive free health care. The party also promised to "encourage farming and develop agriculture", "lower the cost of electricity and other utilities", " develop education and health services through the raising of salaries and enforcing compulsory education", and promote the development of the private sector. Asked how these promises would be funded, particularly considering the promised abolition of VAGST, the party's deputy leader, Palusalue Faʻapo II, stated that "God will provide for us" and that the party would seek additional international aid. He added that the HRPP government had "wasted millions on unnecessary developments such as the new buildings towering over everything in Apia" and that under a TSP government, all public spending would be transparent and accountable.

== Conduct ==
The TSP accused the HRPP of engaging in the practice of vote buying and treating, especially on the day before the election. The prime minister dismissed these allegations and claimed that it was Samoan tradition. He also said that gift-giving was no different to politicians in other nations financing their campaigns.

A total of 300 police officers were present to safeguard the electoral process. In the lead-up to the election, the Samoan police force conducted regular safety briefings, despite the lack of imminent threats. Campaigning ceased at midnight on 3 March; on election day, polling stations closed at 3 pm local time, although other stations, including special polling booths, remained open past that time. Individuals who had not voted but had been waiting in line at stations that closed at 3 pm were allowed to cast their ballots. There were no reports of violence, and a liquor ban was in place during the election. The Pacific Islands Forum, which sent a delegation to observe the electoral process, declared the election to have been conducted in a free, fair and peaceful manner.

== Results ==
Final results showed the HRPP retained its majority, winning 29 seats, while the TSP secured 13 and independents won seven. Around 90% of registered voters participated in the election. Three cabinet ministers, such as justice minister Unasa Mesi Galo, lost re-election. Only two female candidates, including Fiamē Naomi Mataʻafa, were elected. Two candidates were elected unopposed, one of whom was the prime minister.

Party	Votes	%	Seats	+/–
Human Rights Protection Party	48,771	55.56	29	−4
Tautua Samoa Party	21,692	24.71	13	New
Independents	17,311	19.72	7	+1
Total	87,774	100.00	49	0
Source: Election Passport

=== By constituency ===
Constituency	Turnout	Political party	Candidate	Votes	%
Aʻana Alofi 2	1,133	HRPP	Tolofuaivalelei Falemoe Leiʻataua	617	54.5
Aʻana Alofi 2	1,133	Independent	Tanuvasa Muao Seiuli	270	23.8
Aʻana Alofi 2	1,133	TSP	Lemana Ale Logo	246	21.7
Aʻana Alofi 3	2,001	TSP	Toeolesulusulu Cedric Schuster	1,038	51.9
Aʻana Alofi 3	2,001	HRPP	Vaeolenofoafia Tapasu	411	20.5
Aʻana Alofi 3	2,001	Independent	Manu Taialofa Naseri	252	12.6
Aʻana Alofi 3	2,001	Independent	Tapusoa M. Tuigamala	163	8.1
Aʻana Alofi 3	2,001	TSP	Tagoiaega Maotua Levi	137	6.8
Aiga i le tai	2,394	HRPP	Ifopo Matia Filisi	879	36.7
Aiga i le tai	2,394	HRPP	Mulipola Oliva	732	30.6
Aiga i le tai	2,394	HRPP	Sau Siaosi Natapu	487	20.3
Aiga i le tai	2,394	HRPP	Leiataualesa Iosefo Faauileula II	225	9.4
Aiga i le tai	2,394	HRPP	Taimalelagi Naotala	71	3.0
Alataua West	824	HRPP	Lafaitele Patrick Leiataualesa	514	62.4
Alataua West	824	TSP	Tuaiaufai Eliko	170	20.6
Alataua West	824	Independent	Tuioti Aliʻimalemanu Sakaria	140	17.0
Aleipata Itupa I Lalo	1,818	HRPP	Tafua Maluelue Tafua	882	48.5
Aleipata Itupa I Lalo	1,818	HRPP	Paepae Kapeli Sua	477	26.2
Aleipata Itupa I Lalo	1,818	TSP	Letiu Tamatoa Penaia	261	14.4
Aleipata Itupa I Lalo	1,818	HRPP	Faagasealii Sapoa Feagiai	198	10.9
Aleipata Itupa I Luga	1,780	HRPP	Taua Kitiona Seuala	1,009	56.7
Aleipata Itupa I Luga	1,780	Independent	Fuataga Kasimani	771	43.3
Anoamaʻa East	1,871	Independent	Alaiasa Filipo Schwarts Hunt	1,094	58.5
Anoamaʻa East	1,871	HRPP	Moefaauo Lufilufi	592	31.6
Anoamaʻa East	1,871	Independent	Gagaeolo Manase Reupena	127	6.8
Anoamaʻa East	1,871	TSP	Tofae Alailima	58	3.1
Faʻasaleleʻaga 2	1,763	TSP	Papaliʻi Liʻo Taeu Masipau	950	53.9
Faʻasaleleʻaga 2	1,763	Independent	Maileimalo Eneliko Pau	496	28.1
Faʻasaleleʻaga 2	1,763	HRPP	Papaliʻi Mamea Petaia	317	18.0
Faʻasaleleʻaga 3	1,337	TSP	Tuileutu Alavaʻa Voi	678	50.7
Faʻasaleleʻaga 3	1,337	HRPP	Unasa Mesi Galo	437	32.7
Faʻasaleleʻaga 3	1,337	Independent	Ioelu Sua	222	16.6
Faʻasaleleʻaga 4	1,400	Independent	Peseta Vaifou Tevaga	597	42.6
Faʻasaleleʻaga 4	1,400	TSP	Sua Vui-Seinafolava Rimoni Ah Chung	311	22.2
Faʻasaleleʻaga 4	1,400	Independent	Mulitalo Siafausi Vui	242	17.6
Faʻasaleleʻaga 4	1,400	HRPP	Vui Taʻala Tupe Ioane	242	17.6
Falealupo	1,049	TSP	Aʻeau Peniamina	572	54.5
Falealupo	1,049	HRPP	Seumanutafa Akerei Salesa	283	27.0
Falealupo	1,049	HRPP	Aeau Niulesa Mareko	194	18.5
Faleata East	1,740	TSP	Aveau Niko Palamo	774	44.5
Faleata East	1,740	HRPP	Vaitagutu Viliamu Masoe	564	32.4
Faleata East	1,740	HRPP	Manuleleua Lauese Manuleleua	263	15.1
Faleata East	1,740	HRPP	Leatinuu Ray Leo II	139	8.0
Faleata West	3,732	TSP	Lealailepule Rimoni Aiafi	2,341	62.7
Faleata West	3,732	HRPP	Ale Vena Ale	1,391	37.3
Falelatai & Samatau	1,627	HRPP	Taefu Lemi	647	39.8
Falelatai & Samatau	1,627	HRPP	Taefu Olomoutu Salapu Asalele	494	30.4
Falelatai & Samatau	1,627	HRPP	Manoo Kato Kini	486	29.9
Gagaʻemauga 1	2,327	HRPP	Sala Fata Pinati	1,664	71.5
Gagaʻemauga 1	2,327	TSP	Tuala Iosefo Ponifasio	663	28.5
Gagaʻemauga 2	864	TSP	Levaopolo Talatonu Vaai	304	35.2
Gagaʻemauga 2	864	HRPP	Aufai Amalamo	231	26.7
Gagaʻemauga 2	864	HRPP	Aufai Uesile	195	22.6
Gagaʻemauga 2	864	HRPP	Vaaaoao Niupulusu Leo	134	15.5
Gagaʻemauga 3	1,406	Independent	Faamoetauloa Ulaitino Faale Tumaalii	721	51.3
Gagaʻemauga 3	1,406	HRPP	Galuvao Viliamu Sepulona	605	43.0
Gagaʻemauga 3	1,406	Independent	Seuamuli Sapio Tooala	80	5.7
Gagaʻifomauga 1	825	HRPP	Tuiloʻa Anitelea	504	61.1
Gagaʻifomauga 1	825	Independent	Gaiga Aukusitino	321	38.9
Gagaʻifomauga 2	1,985	Independent	Soʻoalo Umi Feo Mene	1,051	53.0
Gagaʻifomauga 2	1,985	HRPP	Safuneituʻuga Paʻaga Neri	409	20.6
Gagaʻifomauga 2	1,985	Independent	Paiaaua Iona Sekuini	213	10.7
Gagaʻifomauga 2	1,985	TSP	Feo Nemaia Esau	195	9.8
Gagaʻifomauga 2	1,985	Independent	Manuta Lavamaile Uesile	117	5.9
Gagaʻifomauga 3	887	HRPP	Laʻauli Leuatea Schmidt	627	70.7
Gagaʻifomauga 3	887	HRPP	Faaulusau Simi Laulua	260	29.3
Lefaga & Faleseʻela	2,186	HRPP	Le Mamea Ropati	1,095	50.1
Lefaga & Faleseʻela	2,186	HRPP	Toleafoa Ken Poutoa	1,091	49.9
Lotofaga	641	HRPP	Fiamē Naomi Mataʻafa	469	73.2
Lotofaga	641	TSP	Fiaola Iosua Lole	172	26.8
Palauli East	2,180	HRPP	Afoafouvale John Moors	798	36.6
Palauli East	2,180	HRPP	Misa Lisati Leleisiuao Palemene	781	35.8
Palauli East	2,180	HRPP	Leavaiseeta Savavau L. Tuipolu	523	24.0
Palauli East	2,180	TSP	Toluono Feti	59	2.7
Palauli East	2,180	TSP	Taulafoga Iaulualo Fatufala	19	0.9
Palauli Le Falefa	1,808	HRPP	Faumuina Tiatia Liuga	918	50.8
Palauli Le Falefa	1,808	TSP	Le Tagaloa Pita	508	28.1
Palauli Le Falefa	1,808	TSP	Tiatia Mapesone	382	21.1
Palauli West	1,847	HRPP	Agafili Patisela Eteuati Tolovaa	527	28.5
Palauli West	1,847	TSP	Taua Falaimo	440	23.8
Palauli West	1,847	HRPP	Afoa Amituanai Mauli	384	20.8
Palauli West	1,847	HRPP	Amituanai Malalatele Tausisi	256	13.9
Palauli West	1,847	HRPP	Toilolo Tamala Lolani Toilolo	240	13.0
Sagaga Le Falefa	2,935	Independent	Tuisa Tasi Patea	1,178	40.1
Sagaga Le Falefa	2,935	HRPP	Loau Keneti Sio	1,115	38.0
Sagaga Le Falefa	2,935	TSP	Maʻaolegalu Peniata Maiava	347	11.8
Sagaga Le Falefa	2,935	Independent	Muaiava Tino Umu Toeava	295	10.1
Sagaga Le Usoga	2,059	HRPP	Muagututagata Peter Ah Him	844	41.0
Sagaga Le Usoga	2,059	TSP	Fata Meafou	684	33.2
Sagaga Le Usoga	2,059	Independent	Maulolo Tavita Amosa	531	25.8
Satupaʻitea	931	HRPP	Tavui Tiafau Tafu Salevao	457	49.1
Satupaʻitea	931	HRPP	Asiata Wairaki Toevai	376	40.4
Satupaʻitea	931	TSP	Aloiamoa Tua Savaiʻi	98	10.5
Siʻumu	1,569	HRPP	Tuʻuʻu Anasiʻi Leota	867	55.3
Siʻumu	1,569	Independent	Faʻalogo Iosefa	702	44.7
Vaimauga East	2,377	HRPP	Tuisugaletaua Sofara Aveau	1,010	42.5
Vaimauga East	2,377	TSP	Tafaese Uili Ioane	573	24.1
Vaimauga East	2,377	TSP	Talifeau Malaki Iakopo	427	18.0
Vaimauga East	2,377	Independent	Maposua Solomona Toailoa	367	15.4
Vaʻa O Fonoti	1,894	HRPP	Tialavea Tionisio Hunt	774	40.9
Vaʻa O Fonoti	1,894	HRPP	Taito Faitele	663	35.0
Vaʻa O Fonoti	1,894	HRPP	Togiai Eteuati Faiʻilagi	235	12.4
Vaʻa O Fonoti	1,894	TSP	Togia Ioane Sagapolutele	152	8.8
Vaʻa O Fonoti	1,894	HRPP	Tautaiolefua Nomeneta Ofoia	70	3.7
Vaisigano 1	1,657	TSP	Vaʻai Papu Vailupe	731	44.1
Vaisigano 1	1,657	HRPP	Tufuga Gafoaleata Faitua	693	41.8
Vaisigano 1	1,657	HRPP	Taʻavao Tiaina Tapu	233	14.1
Vaisigano 2	1,261	TSP	Motuopuaa Uifagasa Aisoli	659	52.3
Vaisigano 2	1,261	HRPP	Tapulesatele Mautene	602	47.7
Source: Psephos

==== Double member constituencies ====
Constituency	Turnout	Political party	Candidate	Votes	%
Aʻana Alofi 1	1,844	Independent	Tuitama Talalelei Tuitama	1,275	27.4
Aʻana Alofi 1	1,844	HRPP	Leaupepe Toleafoa Faafisi	1,253	26.9
Aʻana Alofi 1	1,844	HRPP	Aiono Tile Gafa	1,194	25.6
Aʻana Alofi 1	1,844	Independent	Fesolai Vaisilika Tuigamala	682	14.6
Aʻana Alofi 1	1,844	Independent	Muliaumasealiʻi Sio Vaʻauli	255	5.5
Falealili	5,351	HRPP	Tuiloma Pule Lameko	1,286	24.6
Falealili	5,351	HRPP	Tusa Misi Tupuola	1,162	21.7
Falealili	5,351	TSP	Fuimaono Gaoia Tei	1,023	19.1
Falealili	5,351	TSP	Fuimaono Falefa Lima	670	12.5
Falealili	5,351	HRPP	Falaiva Vaiula Sialaoa	660	12.3
Falealili	5,351	HRPP	Alaifea Laititi Belford	550	10.3
Faʻasaleleʻaga 1	4,779	HRPP	Gatoloaifaana Amataga Alesana-Gidlow	817	17.1
Faʻasaleleʻaga 1	4,779	Independent	Magele Mauiliu Magele	686	14.4
Faʻasaleleʻaga 1	4,779	TSP	Pauli Pipi Tariu	657	14.4
Faʻasaleleʻaga 1	4,779	Independent	Tuilimu Manuele Paletasala	458	9.6
Faʻasaleleʻaga 1	4,779	HRPP	Tiata Sili Pulufana	443	9.3
Faʻasaleleʻaga 1	4,779	Independent	Leuo Lealiiee Taugauli	413	8.6
Faʻasaleleʻaga 1	4,779	Independent	Sealiialofa Tupaimatuna Taiese	345	7.2
Faʻasaleleʻaga 1	4,779	TSP	Fiu Matamua Loimata II	336	7.0
Faʻasaleleʻaga 1	4,779	Independent	Matamua Sili Alapati	264	5.5
Faʻasaleleʻaga 1	4,779	Independent	Tofilau Semeli Sinai	241	5.0
Faʻasaleleʻaga 1	4,779	Independent	Taotua Ioane Matamua	119	2.5
Safata	5,841	TSP	Palusalue Faʻapo II	1,323	22.7
Safata	5,841	HRPP	Manualesagalala Enokati Posala	1,293	22.1
Safata	5,841	HRPP	Leaana Ronnie Posini	1,109	19.0
Safata	5,841	HRPP	Leota-Suatele Tufele	748	12.8
Safata	5,841	TSP	Saunoamaalii Finafinau	748	12.8
Safata	5,841	HRPP	Tuia Pua Fuatogi Letoa	620	10.6
Salega	3,449	TSP	Afualo Wood Salele	1,020	29.6
Salega	3,449	TSP	Tapuai Toese Ah Sam	880	25.5
Salega	3,449	HRPP	Tapuai Sepulona Moananu	682	19.8
Salega	3,449	HRPP	Toomata Alapati Poese	535	15.5
Salega	3,449	Independent	Selu Letoa Reupena	332	9.6
Vaimauga West	7,234	TSP	Lefau Harry Schuster	1,973	27.3
Vaimauga West	7,234	Independent	Lenatai Victor Tamapua	1,377	19.0
Vaimauga West	7,234	HRPP	Anauli Pofitu Fesili	1,003	13.9
Vaimauga West	7,234	Independent	Faaolesa Katopau T. Ainuu	728	10.1
Vaimauga West	7,234	Independent	Taumanupepe Keleso	702	9.7
Vaimauga West	7,234	TSP	Vaea Ivana Eli	647	8.9
Vaimauga West	7,234	HRPP	Patu Ativalu Togi II	612	8.5
Vaimauga West	7,234	Independent	Letaa Tanielu Devoe	131	1.8
Vaimauga West	7,234	Independent	Sagauga Sabu Utaileuo	61	0.8
Individual Voters	5,188	HRPP	Papaliʻitele Niko Lee Hang	1,635	31.5
Individual Voters	5,188	Independent	Maualaivao Pat Ah Him	1,379	26.6
Individual Voters	5,188	HRPP	Faleomavaega Vincent Fepuleai	897	17.3
Individual Voters	5,188	TSP	Tamaleta Taimang Jensen	770	14.8
Individual Voters	5,188	TSP	Muliagatele Alfred Hunt	462	8.9
Individual Voters	5,188	Independent	Tupa Anthony Stephen Brown	45	0.9
Source: Psephos

==== Uncontested ====
The following two candidates were elected without opposition:

Constituency	Candidate	Party
Anoamaʻa West	Fonotoe Pierre Lauofo	HRPP
Lepā	Tuilaʻepa Saʻilele Malielegaoi	HRPP

== Aftermath ==
Following the election, all seven independents joined the HRPP, giving the ruling caucus a two-thirds majority with a total of 36 seats. Fonotoe Pierre Lauofo, the member of parliament for Anoamaʻa West, was elected deputy leader of the HRPP and subsequently became the new deputy prime minister. He succeeded Misa Telefoni Retzlaff, who opted not to seek re-election and retire. Among other new cabinet ministers was Le Mamea Ropati, a former opposition leader who led the Samoan Democratic United Party in the previous election cycle. The TSP's founder and chief whip, Lealailepule Rimoni Aiafi, expressed confidence that the party would perform well in the next election cycle. He also stressed the importance of party unity and stated, "Five years from now, we should definitely win. This [election] is a good start for us, and we have a good opposition, so we should start our campaign right now, and that's what we are going to do now, is prove to the people and educate them and tell them what Samoa needs, and the next election should be a[n] easy battle for us."

Several members of parliament later lost their seats by order of the Supreme Court due to electoral petitions. Among these individuals were Opposition Leader Vailupe and the associate minister of natural resources and environment, Taua Kitiona Seuala. By-elections subsequently took place in July in the ousted member's constituencies, all were won by HRPP candidates. These results increased the ruling caucus' seat share to 37, whilst the opposition lost a seat, leaving them with 12 members. Following Vailupe's ousting, the TSP elected Deputy Leader Palusalue Faʻapo II to replace him as leader of the party and the opposition. The party also elected former speaker of parliament, Aʻeau Peniamina, as deputy leader. The 15th parliamentary session commenced on 18 March 2011.

== See also ==
- List of members of the Legislative Assembly of Samoa (2011–2016)
- 2011 Samoan by-elections
