= Tuilaʻepa Saʻilele Malielegaoi =

Prime Minister of Samoa from 1998 to 2021

The Honourable Susuga Tuilaʻepa Saʻilele Malielegaoi MP
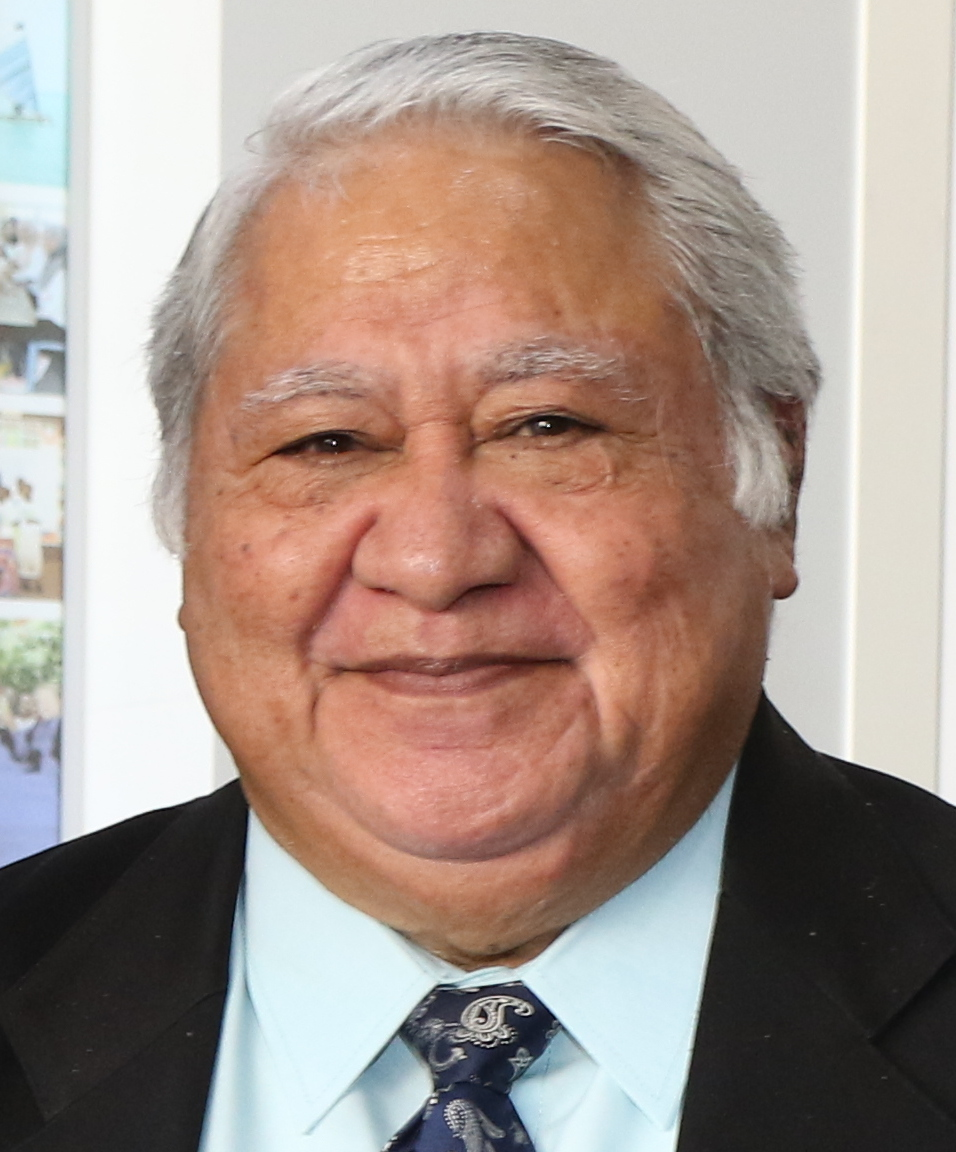
- Tuilaʻepa in 2018

Leader of the Opposition
- Incumbent
- Assumed office 5 July 2023
- Deputy: Fonotoe Pierre Lauofo
- Preceded by: Fonotoe Pierre Lauofo
- In office 27 July 2021 – 11 November 2022
- Deputy: Fonotoe Pierre Lauofo
- Preceded by: Palusalue Faʻapo II (Note: Office vacant: 2016 – 2021)
- Succeeded by: Fonotoe Pierre Lauofo

6th Prime Minister of Samoa
- In office 23 November 1998 – 24 May 2021 (Note: Disputed: 24 May 2021 – 23 July 2021. The Supreme Court ruled on 23 July that Fiamē Naomi Mataʻafa's FAST government had been legitimate since 24 May. Tuilaʻepa's HRPP government did not relinquish power until 27 July.)
- O le Ao o le Malo: Malietoa Tanumafili II; Tui Ātua Tupua Tamasese Efi; Tuimalealiʻifano Vaʻaletoʻa Sualauvi II
- Deputy: Misa Telefoni Retzlaff; Fonotoe Pierre Lauofo; Fiamē Naomi Mataʻafa
- Preceded by: Tofilau Eti Alesana
- Succeeded by: Fiamē Naomi Mataʻafa

Leader of the Human Rights Protection Party
- Incumbent
- Assumed office 23 November 1998
- Deputy: Misa Telefoni Retzlaff; Fonotoe Pierre Lauofo; Fiamē Naomi Mataʻafa
- Preceded by: Tofilau Eti Alesana
Other offices held
Minister of Foreign Affairs
In office 23 November 1998 – 24 May 2021
Preceded by	Tofilau Eti Alesana
Succeeded by	Fiamē Naomi Mataʻafa
Minister of Natural Resources and Environment
In office 11 September 2020 – 24 May 2021
Preceded by	Fiamē Naomi Mataʻafa
Succeeded by	Toeolesulusulu Cedric Schuster
Deputy Prime Minister of Samoa
In office 15 May 1991 – 23 November 1998
Prime Minister	Tofilau Eti Alesana
Preceded by	Tupua Tamasese Efi
Succeeded by	Misa Telefoni Retzlaff (2001)

Member of the Samoan Parliament for Lepā
- Incumbent
- Assumed office May 1981 (Note: Suspended: 24 May – 13 September 2022; 19 October 2022 – 4 July 2023)
- Preceded by: Fatialofa Momoʻe

Personal details
- Born: Saʻilele Malielegaoi; 14 February 1944 (age 82) (Note: Sailele's birthday is normally stated to be 14 April 1945, however this was an altered birth date by his father to allow him to attend primary school.) Lepā, Western Samoa Trust Territory (now Samoa)
- Party: Human Rights Protection Party
- Spouse: Gillian Meredith
- Children: 8
- Education: University of Auckland
- Sports career
Medal record
Archery
Representing Samoa
South Pacific Games
Silver medal – second place	2007 Apia	Mixed team recurve

Susuga Tuilaʻepa Lupesoliai Neioti Aiono Saʻilele Malielegaoi (born 14 February 1944) is a Samoan politician and economist who is the current Leader of the Opposition of Samoa. A leader of the Human Rights Protection Party (HRPP), he served as the sixth prime minister of Samoa from 1998 to 2021.

Tuilaʻepa first entered parliament in 1981 when he won a by-election to represent the electorate of Lepā, and was subsequently appointed deputy prime minister and minister of finance in the government of Prime Minister Tofilau Eti Alesana. He also held the portfolios of Tourism and Trade, Commerce & Industry. After Tofilau resigned in 1998, Tuilaʻepa became the prime minister and HRPP party leader. At the 2021 election, the HRPP lost their majority but Tuilaʻepa refused to leave office, leading to the 2021 Samoan constitutional crisis. The crisis was resolved by Samoa's Court of Appeal on 23 July 2021, which ruled that Fiamē Naomi Mataʻafa had been prime minister since 24 May. On 26 July, Tuilaʻepa conceded defeat and assumed the role of opposition leader the following day.

Tuilaʻepa was indefinitely suspended from the legislative assembly on 24 May for breach of parliamentary privileges and contempt of parliament. The indefinite suspension was recommended by the privileges and ethics committee. He later described his suspension as a "witch hunt". However, he was later reinstated on 13 September following a Supreme Court ruling that voided the suspension. The privileges and ethics committee then reconvened and suggested that Tuilaʻepa be suspended again for 24 months until 4 July 2023. Parliament approved the recommendation on 19 October. His first tenure as opposition leader effectively ended in November 2022 after the speaker of parliament announced the legislature's recognition of Tuilaʻepa in the role had ceased due to his suspension. He was later succeeded by Fonotoe Pierre Lauofo. After the suspension was ruled unconstitutional by the Supreme Court on 4 July 2023, he again became opposition leader.

== Early life and education ==
Tuilaʻepa, born in the village of Lepā on the island of Upolu, attended high school at St Joseph's College in Lotopa and at St Paul's College, Auckland in New Zealand. He then obtained a master's from the University of Auckland, becoming the first Samoan to receive a master's degree in commerce.

== Early career ==
He worked as a civil servant for the Samoan treasury, and then became director of the Economics Department, and then deputy financial secretary. He then moved to Brussels, where he worked for the European Economic Community and for Coopers & Lybrand.

Tuilaʻepa first won election to represent the parliamentary constituency of Lepā in 1981, after the death of its previous representative. Tuilaʻepa was appointed minister of economic affairs in 1982 and minister of finance in 1984. He served as deputy prime minister and minister of finance under Tofilau Eti Alesana following the Human Rights Protection Party's return to power after the coalition government of Vaʻai Kolone and Tupua.

== Premiership (1998–2021) ==
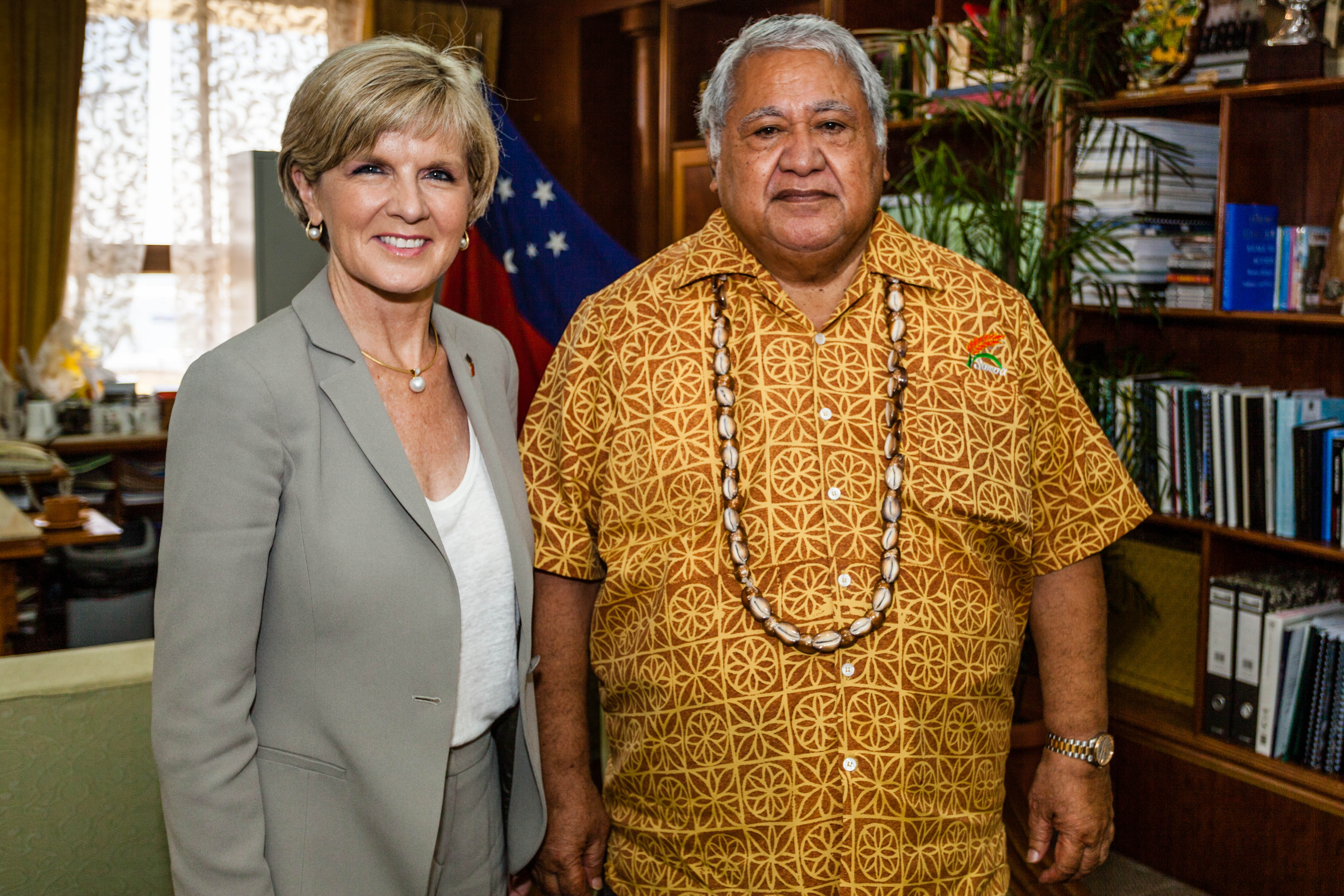
Tuilaʻepa with Australian Foreign Minister Julie Bishop at the 3rd UN Small Islands Developing States conference, August 2014

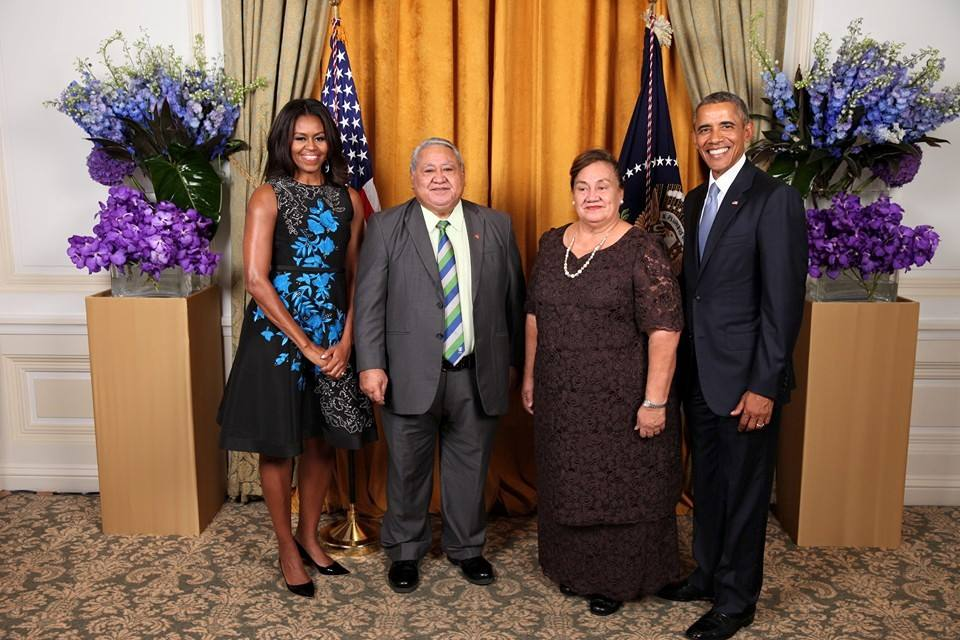
Tuilaʻepa and his wife Gillian Muriel Malielegaoi with the Obamas

In 1998, Tofilau resigned due to ill health, making Tuilaʻepa the prime minister. Tuilaʻepa led his HRPP party to re-election in the 2001, 2006, 2011, and 2016 general elections. In 2012, he became Samoa's longest serving prime minister, surpassing the tenure of his predecessor, Tofilau Eti Alesana. At the time of his electoral defeat in 2021, Tuilaʻepa was also the second longest serving incumbent prime minister in the world, only behind Cambodia's Hun Sen.

Following a Cabinet reshuffle after the 2001 Samoan general election, Tuilaʻepa relinquished the post of minister of finance to Misa Telefoni Retzlaff, who also became the new deputy prime minister. The reason given for Tuilaʻepa's relinquishment of the Ministry of Finance was the amount of responsibility and work involved being both prime minister and minister of finance and to do the job properly required a full-time minister.

=== Domestic policy ===
==== Traffic lane switch ====
Tuilaʻepa's government passed highly controversial legislation in 2009 to switch Samoan road use from right to left-hand traffic. The controversy resulted in a peaceful demonstration which drew more than 15,000 people the largest protest demonstration in Samoan history, and to the founding of the People's Party, a political party established to protest against changing sides.

==== Time zone shift ====
In 2011, Tuilaʻepa's government introduced a bill to shift Samoa's time zone west of the International Date Line, to facilitate economic relations with Australia, New Zealand and Asia, by ensuring that Samoa would no longer be one calendar day away from them. According to Samoa Observer editor Keni Lesa, many Samoans viewed the bill as "another crazy idea from our crazy prime minister". Opposition politicians also criticised it, arguing that it would not increase exports, and that it would in fact deprive Samoa of "its unique tourism selling point as the last place on earth to see the sun", just east of the Date Line. Tuilaʻepa responded by calling opposition MP Lealailepule Rimoni Aiafi (of the Tautua Samoa Party) "very stupid", adding that "only an idiot" would fail to see the merits of the bill.

The bill, however, earned the support of the Samoa Chamber of Commerce and the vast majority of the private and finance sector. The major benefit being that, given that most trade was conducted with New Zealand and Australia along with a growing trade sector with eastern Asia, being on the same day as these major trading partners would lead to improvements in productivity, as more trade could be facilitated during a shared five-day week, as opposed to the previous situation of only sharing four week days to conduct business.

==== Christianity as state religion ====
In June 2017, the Samoan Parliament passed a bill to increase support for Christianity in the country's constitution, including adding a clause in Article 1 stating that "Samoa is a Christian nation founded of God the Father, the Son and the Holy Spirit". According to The Diplomat, "What Samoa has done is shift references to Christianity into the body of the constitution, giving the text far more potential to be used in legal processes." The preamble to the constitution already described the country as "an independent State based on Christian principles and Samoan custom and traditions."

=== Foreign policy ===
Tuilaʻepa emerged as one of the most vocal critics of Fijian interim leader Commodore Frank Bainimarama, who came to power in the 2006 Fijian coup d'état. In early 2009, after Bainimarama accused Samoa's foreign policy of being dictated by New Zealand, Tuilaʻepa questioned whether Bainimarama was sober when he made the claim. In response, Bainimarama accused Tuilaʻepa of being "un-Pacific", which led Tuilaʻepa to reiterate that Bainimarama had showed little respect towards other Pacific leaders, citing Bainimarama rescinding assurances to leaders at a regional meeting in Tonga that elections would be held in May 2008 and not attending regional meetings of the Pacific Islands Forum in Niue and Papua New Guinea. Tuilaʻepa added that Bainimarama's actions could not be described as the "Pacific way".

In late 2011, Tuilaʻepa initiated a meeting of Polynesian leaders which led, in November, to the formal launching of the Polynesian Leaders Group, a regional grouping intended to co-operate on a variety of issues including culture and language, education, responses to climate change, and trade and investment in Polynesian countries. The group was in part a response to the Melanesian Spearhead Group.

== 2021 Samoan general election ==
During the 2021 general election held on 9 April 2021, Tuilaʻepa was re-elected to his parliamentary constituency of Lepā unopposed. Preliminary results from the general election indicated that the HRPP had secured 24 seats, FAST 23 and Tautua Samoa and an Independent both winning one seat. An accounting error was detected in the Vaimauga No. 2 constituency, which had incorrectly displayed the Tautua Samoa candidate leading ahead of the HRPP candidate. The final election results indicated that the HRPP and FAST were tied with 25 seats each, with newly-elected independent MP Tuala Iosefo Ponifasio holding the balance of power.

After the election, the HRPP and FAST entered into talks with Tuala in an attempt to form a majority government. The Samoan Electoral Commission later announced that the 10% female quota in parliament had not been fulfilled, adding an extra parliamentary seat which went to the HRPP. Tuala then agreed to enter into a coalition with FAST, resulting in a hung parliament in which both parties had 26 seats each.

On the evening of 4 May 2021, O le Ao o le Malo (Head of State) Tuimalealiʻifano Vaʻaletoʻa Sualauvi II announced that a second election would be held in order to resolve the deadlock. This occurred before any of the electoral petitions were resolved. The HRPP endorsed the decision, whilst it was opposed by FAST. Tuilaʻepa reportedly advised Tuimalealiʻifano to issue the proclamation. The HRPP then began to campaign for the second election, despite the legality of it being in question.

== 2021 Samoan constitutional crisis ==
On 17 May, the Supreme Court of Samoa ruled that the addition of the new seat was unconstitutional, giving FAST a parliamentary majority. The court subsequently overturned the voiding of the 9 April election results and declared that the call for a new election had no legal authority, and ordered parliament to convene within 45 days of the original polling. Tuimalealiʻifano then issued a statement, proclaiming that parliament convene on 24 May. This was retracted shortly after, triggering a constitutional crisis. Tuimalealiʻifano did not elaborate on why the decision was made.

Tuilaʻepa denounced the court decision to convene parliament as "illegal", and that the Supreme Court justices should be charged for breaching the state of emergency regulations. Tuilaʻepa also announced that he and the HRPP caucus would refuse to be sworn in when parliament convened. On the evening of 23 May, a day before the scheduled convention of parliament, parliament speaker Leaupepe Toleafoa Faafisi purported to cancel the swearing-in ceremony in defiance of the Supreme Court's ruling. The following morning, in his capacity as caretaker minister of parliament, Tuilaʻepa ordered the speaker to deny Fiamē Naomi Mataʻafa and the FAST caucus access to the parliament building. After they were sworn in in an ad hoc ceremony outside the building, he accused them of treason.

On 29 May, Tuilaʻepa was cited for contempt of court for not obeying the court's orders and using offensive language towards the Supreme Court justices.

On 3 June, Tuilaʻepa entered into negotiations with Fiamē to discuss a political transition. After only two sessions the talks reached an impasse, with Tuilaʻepa refusing to either leave the prime ministership or convene parliament unless all petitions were resolved.

Due to various electoral court petitions, the HRPP's seat count in parliament fell from 25 to 17 whilst FAST maintained its 26-seat majority.

On 23 July 2021, the Court of Appeal ruled that the 24 May swearing in of the FAST party was legal and that they had been the government since then. The court also declared that Tuilaʻepa and the HRPP ministers had been illegally occupying the government offices since that date. Following the court decision, Tuilaʻepa accused the judiciary of "treason" and stated that the decision was "bizarre". He also claimed that "leaders are chosen by god". The following day he began to pack up his office. On 25 July, the head of state recognised the new FAST government. Tuilaʻepa conceded defeat on 26 July, nearly three months after the election.

On 23 March 2022 he was convicted alongside HRPP secretary Lealailepule Rimoni Aiafi of scandalising the court for his attacks on the judiciary during and following the constitutional crisis, but escaped penalty. On 24 May 2022 both were suspended indefinitely from the Legislative Assembly after the Privileges Committee found that they had brought parliament into disrepute.

== Leader of the Opposition (2021–2022; 2023–present) ==
On 27 July 2021, Tuilaʻepa assumed the role of opposition leader. Shortly after, he began to call for the resignation of all Supreme Court justices. Tuilaʻepa also continued to question the judgement of the court of appeals on their recognition of FAST as the new government.

=== Convoy protest ===
On 30 July, Tuilaʻepa and supporters of the HRPP led a convoy protest against the judiciary. Once the convoy arrived in Savaiʻi, the HRPP set out to lay wreaths at the graves of former HRPP prime ministers Tofilau Eti Alesana and Vaʻai Kolone. The convoy were able to lay wreaths at Tofilau's grave, but were refused to do so at Kolone's by his son Vaʻai Papu Vaʻai. The HRPP had used Vaʻai Kolone's image in an advertisement to promote the party's demonstration in Savaiʻi, something that Vaʻai Papu expressed discontent about. Vaʻai Papu had been critical of the HRPP's actions during the 2021 constitutional crisis, and stated that the party should be "ashamed" and accused them of using his father's image "in vain". He also suggested that the party change its name from the "Human Rights Protection Party" to the "Malielegaoi Human Rights Demolition Party". The convoy was forced to turn around, when the villages of Salelologa and Sasina on Savaiʻi established roadblocks and refused the HRPP passage. Tuilaʻepa deemed the roadblocks "unlawful", but agreed to turn back for "the sake of peace".

Despite the rally not folding out as he intended, Tuilaʻepa declared the convoy protest to be a "victory". He then accused FAST Chairman and Minister of Agriculture, Fisheries and Scientific Research, Laauli Leuatea Polataivao, of being the "mastermind" behind the road blocks. Laauli denied being involved. Tuilaʻepa issued an informal apology to the judiciary on 8 September after weeks of criticising and protesting against them. He also expressed that it is the "nature of the role of the opposition to question all three arms of government". Tuilaʻepa later contradicted this, when he denied ever apologising to the judiciary.

=== Threat of lawsuit against the ministry of finance ===
On 21 August 2021, the minister of finance, Mulipola Anarosa Ale Molioo expressed that she did not have "complete confidence" in Tuilaʻepa's son Oscar Malielegaoi, who served as chief executive officer of the Ministry of Finance. In response, Tuilaʻepa stated that whilst they can sack the CEO for a lack of cooperation with the minister, he would file a lawsuit against the ministry should they not have "strong reasons" for carrying out this decision. Ale Molioo later requested that Oscar Malielegaoi resign, which he then did on 28 August.

=== Claims of feminist plot ===
On 24 August 2021, Tuilaʻepa claimed that he had been unseated in a feminist plot led by New Zealand prime minister Jacinda Ardern, who allegedly "wanted Samoa to have a female Prime Minister". This was later rejected by prime minister Ardern.

=== Swearing in of the HRPP caucus ===
After the Supreme Court recognised the ad hoc ceremony which took place outside parliament on 24 May as legal, uncertainty arose about whether the HRPP caucus, which did not attend the ceremony, would be able to be sworn in at the convention of parliament as required by the constitution. On 1 September 2021, prime minister Fiamē Naomi Mataʻafa announced that the 17th Samoan parliament would convene on 14 September. Shortly before the prime minister's announcement, Tuilaʻepa wrote to the speaker of the legislative assembly Papaliʻi Liʻo Taeu Masipau, asserting that himself and the HRPP caucus intend to be sworn by the head of state once parliament convenes. Papaliʻi then replied by saying that the HRPP caucus would be sworn in by himself in accordance with the constitution. Regardless of whether they would be sworn in or not, Tuilaʻepa announced that the HRPP caucus would attend the first convention of the 17th parliament.

A day before the sitting of parliament, Papaliʻi announced that the HRPP members would not be sworn in and that they would not be permitted to attend the inaugural session, making it possible that Tuilaʻepa and the HRPP caucus would have to contend by-elections in order to return to parliament. On the morning of 14 September, Tuilaʻepa and HRPP MPs and supporters attempted to enter the parliament building, but were denied access by the police. Tuilaʻepa described the event as being "a sad day for Samoa" and accused the FAST party of being "dictatorial". He then announced that the HRPP would be challenging the speaker's decision in court. The Supreme Court ruled in the HRPP's favour on 16 September, ordering the speaker to swear in all 18 elected members of the HRPP caucus. Papaliʻi had them sworn in the following morning.

=== Opposition to abortion legalisation proposal ===
In November 2021, Tuilaʻepa rejected a United Nations recommendation for Samoa to legalise abortion. He described abortion as "murder" and stated that it should not be legalised as it violated Samoa's "Christian beliefs". Tuilaʻepa also commented that not all UN proposals are "good and suitable" for all nation-states, adding that "this is because the world is made of different people with different beliefs and from different ethnic groups." He also said that some UN proposals, particularly abortion, were not "applicable" to Samoa.

=== Calls to step down ===
Following a poor showing at the November 2021 Samoan by-elections, HRPP MP and former minister of education, sports and culture Loau Keneti Sio called upon Tuilaʻepa to resign when he stated that HRPP senior members should "hang up their boxing gloves". Despite the HRPP having won all seven electorates up for by-elections in the April general election, the party only retained two seats. Tuilaʻepa responded to Loau's statement by denying "tension (was) brewing within the Human Rights Protection Party". Instead, he expressed that 'Samoa's oldest political party is still in unity' and that the HRPP fight is "far from over". Tuilaʻepa later said he was ready for party members to address a potential resignation.

=== Suspension from parliament ===
Following Tuilaʻepa's permanent suspension from the legislative assembly, after the privileges and ethics committee found him and the HRPP secretary Lealailepule Rimoni Aiafi in contempt of parliament, the HRPP filed a lawsuit against the decision. The order arose following a formal complaint by deputy prime minister Tuala Iosefo Ponifasio. Tuilaʻepa claimed that his permanent suspension violated the terms of the "Harmony Agreement" signed by his party and FAST, which sought a resolution to the constitutional crisis of 2021. Tuilaʻepa, who was absent from parliament when the suspension came into effect as he was in isolation following a trip to Ireland to attend the World Rugby Council meeting, stated his absence meant he could not defend himself, implying unfairness. In response, the chair of the privileges and ethics committee, Valasi Toogamaga Tafito, dismissed Tuilaʻepa's claims and highlighted the three-hour zoom call that the committee had with him. Tuilaʻepa later accused prime minister Fiamē of being the "mastermind" behind his indefinite suspension and stated that "no secret can remain forever in a small society like Samoa, and eventually no leader can continue to hide forever whilst directing others to do her dirty bidding." Fiamē dismissed the claims as false. Tuilaʻepa also claimed that FAST was conducting a "witch hunt" and alleged that the governing party behaved as if they were in the opposition. He urged FAST to focus instead on "nation-building" and issues such as the COVID-19 pandemic, climate change and the effects of both on the Samoan economy. On 30 August, the supreme court ruled the suspension to be unconstitutional. He was reinstated on 13 September.

The privileges and ethics committee subsequently reviewed Tuilaʻepa's case and recommended that he and Lealailepule be re-suspended without pay for 24 months. The legislative assembly then approved the committee's motion on 19 October, with all present FAST members and one from the HRPP voting for it. Tuilaʻepa reacted by stating that he and Lealailepule would not resign from their seats, insisting, "if we resign, it will make it look like we did something wrong, and we are admitting it. But we know we did not do anything wrong..." The deputy prime minister demanded that Tuilaʻepa and the HRPP apologise for their actions in the constitutional crisis, but the opposition leader refused and said "why would we apologise when we did not do anything wrong? We only apologise to God which is what we had done, but never to them (FAST)". One high-ranking Matai in Lepā affirmed that support for Tuilaʻepa in the constituency was high.

In November 2022, speaker Papaliʻi declared that parliament no longer recognised Tuilaʻepa as the official opposition leader due to his suspension, effectively ending his tenure. On 27 January 2023, parliament voted for HRPP deputy leader Fonotoe Pierre Lauofo to succeed Tuila‘epa as the opposition leader. On 4 July 2023, the Supreme Court ruled that Tuilaʻepa and Lealailepule's suspension was unconstitutional and void, and the following day Tuilaʻepa regained the position of opposition leader.

=== Treason allegations ===
Tuilaʻepa was re-elected in the 2025 election.

In March 2026 the FAST government convened a special parliamentary committee to investigate Tuila‘epa, HRPP deputy leader Fonotoe Pierre Lauofo, and HRPP secretary Lealaʻilepule Rimoni Aiafi on allegations of treason and defamation over the 2021 Samoan constitutional crisis and more recent statements criticising the government.

== Personal life ==
Tuilaʻepa holds the matai titles of Tuilaʻepa, Lupesoliai, Neioti, Aiono, Fatialofa, Lolofie, Galumalemana (Vaitele) and Aueluā.

He lost two relatives in the 2009 Samoa earthquake and tsunami, including the daughter of one of his nieces. The tsunami destroyed most of Tuilaʻepa's hometown of Lepā, leaving just the church and the village's welcome-sign standing.

Tuilaʻepa competed for his country at the 2007 South Pacific Games in the sport of target archery. In participating in the Games, Tuilaʻepa became the first elected leader to represent his country at a multi-sport event. Having taken up the sport only five months prior to the Games, Tuilaʻepa was ranked second in Samoa in the combined bow discipline. Tuilaʻepa's son was also a reserve team member. On day 10 of the Games, Tuilaʻepa won a silver medal in the mixed recurve team play event. Tuilaʻepa also founded Apia West Rugby, and served as chairman of the Samoa Rugby Union. In March 2026, he stepped down as Lakapi Samoa chairman.

== Assassination attempts ==
Tuilaʻepa has been the target of three plots to kill him, one of those being almost successful when, in 1999, Eletise Leafa Vitale tried to kill him but instead one of Tuilaʻepa's Cabinet Ministers was murdered. In December 2010, another plot was uncovered by Samoan police and, in August 2019, authorities foiled a detailed plan to assassinate him.

== Notes ==
Legislative Assembly of Samoa
Preceded by Fatialofa Momoʻe	Member of Parliament for Lepā; 1981–present	Incumbent
Political offices
Preceded by Tofilau Eti Alesana	Minister of Finance; 1984–1985	Succeeded by Faasootauloa Semu Plagi
Preceded by Faasootauloa Pualanga	Minister of Finance; 1988–2001	Succeeded by Misa Telefoni Retzlaff
Preceded by Tui Ātua Tupua Tamasese Efi	Deputy Prime Minister of Samoa; 1991–1998	Vacant Title next held by Misa Telefoni Retzlaff
Preceded by Tofilau Eti Alesana	Prime Minister of Samoa; 1998–2021	Succeeded by Fiamē Naomi Mataʻafa
Preceded by Tofilau Eti Alesana	Minister of Foreign Affairs; 1998–2021	Succeeded by Fiamē Naomi Mataʻafa
Preceded by Faumuina Tiatia Liuga	Minister of Finance; 2014–2016	Succeeded by Sili Epa Tuioti
Preceded by Fiamē Naomi Mataʻafa	Minister of Natural Resources and Environment; 2020–2021	Succeeded by Toeolesulusulu Cedric Schuster
Vacant Title last held by Palusalue Faʻapo II	Leader of the Opposition; 2021–2022	Vacant Title next held by Fonotoe Pierre Lauofo
Preceded by Fonotoe Pierre Lauofo	Leader of the Opposition; 2023–present	Incumbent
Party political offices
Preceded by Tofilau Eti Alesana	Leader of the Human Rights Protection Party; 1998–present	Incumbent
