= Human Rights Protection Party =

Samoan political party

Human Rights Protection Party Vaega Faʻaupufai e Puipuia Aia Tatau a Tagata
- Leader: Tuilaʻepa Saʻilele Malielegaoi
- Deputy Leader: Fonotoe Pierre Lauofo
- Founders: Vaʻai Kolone; Tofilau Eti Alesana
- Founded: May 1979
- Ideology: Christian democracy Social conservatism
- Political position: Centre to centre-right
- Colours: Blue; Red
- Legislative Assembly: 14 / 51

Website
- Official website

The Human Rights Protection Party (HRPP, Samoan: Vaega Faʻaupufai e Puipuia Aia Tatau a Tagata) is a Samoan political party. It was founded in 1979 and dominated Samoan party politics for decades thereafter, leading every government until their defeat in 2021. Former Prime Minister Tuilaʻepa Saʻilele Malielegaoi has led the party since 1998.

== History ==
Vaʻai Kolone and Tofilau Eti Alesana co-founded the party in May 1979 in opposition to the government of Tupuola Efi. It governed the country from first winning power in 1982 to 2021, except for a brief period in 1986 and 1987 when internal differences forced it into coalition.

The two founders of the early party, Kolone and Alesana, both became Prime Ministers of Samoa.

The U.S. State Department's 2010 human rights report (published on 8 April 2011) stated that the Human Rights Protection Party remained the only officially recognized party in the Legislative Assembly of Samoa (the Fono) as of that date.

After the April 2021 Samoan general election the HRPP refused to yield power to the newly elected government, triggering the 2021 Samoan constitutional crisis. The Court of Appeal ruled against the HRPP on 23 July 2021, allowing the opposition to belatedly take power.

In November 2022, MPs Ale Vena Ale and Tuʻuʻu Anasiʻi Leota resigned from the HRPP to become independents, saying they did not want to remain in a party led by a leader guilty of contempt of court.

== Principles and policies ==
In June 2017, the Legislative Assembly passed a bill to increase support for Christianity in the country's constitution, including a reference to the Trinity in Article 1. According to The Diplomat, "What Samoa has done is shift references to Christianity into the body of the constitution, giving the text far more potential to be used in legal processes." The preamble to the constitution already described the country as "an independent State based on Christian principles and Samoan custom and traditions."

== Election results ==
=== Legislative Assembly elections ===
| Election | Leader | Votes | % | Seats | +/– | Rank | Status |
|---|---|---|---|---|---|---|---|
| 1982 | Vaʻai Kolone | 3,482 | 29.3 | 24 / 47 | New | 1st | Government |
| 1985 | Tofilau Eti Alesana | 4,698 | 34.54 | 32 / 47 | ▲8 | 1st | Government |
| 1988 | Tofilau Eti Alesana | 5,017 | 35.87 | 23 / 47 | ▼9 | 1st | Government |
| 1991 | Tofilau Eti Alesana | 29,768 | 49.58 | 27 / 47 | ▲4 | 1st | Government |
| 1996 | Tofilau Eti Alesana | 29,353 | 43.54 | 24 / 49 | ▼3 | 1st | Government |
| 2001 | Tuilaʻepa Saʻilele Malielegaoi | 34,262 | 44.82 | 23 / 49 | ▼1 | 1st | Government |
| 2006 | Tuilaʻepa Saʻilele Malielegaoi | 42,156 | 50.20 | 33 / 49 | ▲10 | 1st | Government |
| 2011 | Tuilaʻepa Saʻilele Malielegaoi | 48,771 | 55.56 | 29 / 49 | ▼4 | 1st | Government |
| 2016 | Tuilaʻepa Saʻilele Malielegaoi | 45,505 | 56.92 | 35 / 50 | ▲6 | 1st | Government |
| 2021 | Tuilaʻepa Saʻilele Malielegaoi | 49,237 | 55.38 | 25 / 51 | ▼10 | 1st | Official opposition |
| 2025 | Tuilaʻepa Saʻilele Malielegaoi | 33,040 | 36.78 | 14 / 51 | ▼11 | ▼2nd | Official opposition |
