= List of political parties in Samoa =

This article lists political parties in Samoa. As of 2020, Samoa has six officially recognized political parties, the ruling Faʻatuatua i le Atua Samoa ua Tasi (FAST) party, the Human Rights Protection Party (HRPP), the Tautua Samoa Party, the Samoa First Party, and the Samoa National Democratic Party. In May 2020 a fifth party, the Tumua ma Puleono, registered for the elections, and in July 2020, the Faʻatuatua i le Atua Samoa ua Tasi did as well to challenge the longstanding HRPP, which had been in power since 1982.

Despite political parties being present in the country, ideologies and manifestos remain relatively fluid, with local connections and matai holding great/more influence in convincing voters to support a particular candidate over party affiliation in many circumstances.

== Parties represented in the Fono ==
Party	Fono Seats
Human Rights Protection Party; Vaega Faʻaupufai e Puipuia Aia Tatau a Tagata	14 / 51
Samoa United in Faith; Faʻatuatua i le Atua Samoa ua Tasi	30 / 51
Samoa Uniting Party; Samoa Ua Potopoto	3 / 51

== Other parties ==
- Constitution Democracy Republic Party
- Samoa Labour Party
- Samoa National Democratic Party
- Tumua ma Pule Reform Republican Party (TPRRP)

== Defunct parties ==
- Christian Democratic Party (Samoa) (CDP)
- Samoa All People's Party (SAPP)
- Samoan Democratic United Party (SDUP)
- Samoa First Party
- Samoa Liberal Party (SLP)
- Samoa National Party (SNP)
- Samoa Party (SP)
- Samoan Conservative Progressive Party (SCPP)
- Samoan National Development Party (SNDP)
- Samoa Progressive Political Party (SPP)
- Samoan United Independents Political Party (SUIPP)
- Samoan United People's Party
- Sovereign Independent Samoa Party (SIS)
- Tautua Samoa Party (TSP)
- Temokalasi Samoa Faʻamatai (Samoan Democracy of Matai) (TSFPP)
- Tumua ma Puleono
- The Christian Party (CP)
- The People's Party (TPP)
- United Samoa People's Party (USPP)
- Western Samoa Labour Party (WSLP)
- Samoan branch of the Nazi Party (NSDAP)

== See also ==
- Politics of Samoa
- List of political parties by country
