= List of members of the Legislative Assembly of Samoa (2006–2011) =

Members of the Legislative Assembly of Samoa were elected on 31 March 2006. It consisted of 49 representatives, elected from six two-seat and 35 single-seat territorial constituencies, and two non-territorial constituencies.

As of May 2009, there were four woman MPs, but one, Fuimaono Na'oia Te'i, was expelled by the Speaker at the end of May, due to changing her party membership.

The parliamentary session was officially opened by the O le Ao o le Malo, Malietoa Tanumafili II, on 30 May 2006.

== Members ==
Party	Leader	Seats
Human Rights Protection Party	Tuilaepa Aiono Sailele Malielegaoi	32
Samoan Democratic United Party	Le Mamea Ropati, then Asiata Sale'imoa Va'ai	10
Independents		7

=== Initial MPs ===
Name	Party	Electorate	Term
A'eau Peniamina	SDUP	Falealupo	Fourth
Aiono Tile Gafa	HRPP	A'ana Alofi No. 1	Second
Anauli Pofitu Fesili	HRPP	Vaimauga West	First
Asiata Sale'imoa Va'ai	SDUP	Satupa'itea	Second
Faumuina Tiatia Liuga	HRPP	Palauli-Le-Falefa	Second
Fiame Naomi	HRPP	Lotofaga	Sixth
Fonotoe Pierre Lauofo	HRPP	Anoama'a West	Second
Fuimaono Naoia Tei	SDUP	Falealili	First
Galuvao Viliamu Sepulona	Independent	Gagaemauga No. 3	First
Gatoloaifaana Amataga Alesana-Gidlow	HRPP	Fa'asalele'aga No. 1	First
Hans Joachim Keil III	HRPP	Individual	Fifth
Laauli Leuatea Polataivao	HRPP	Gagaifomauga No. 3	First
Lafaitele Patrick Leiataualesa	HRPP	Alataua West	First
Le Mamea Ropati	SDUP	Lefaga & Falese'ela	Seventh
Lealailepule Rimoni Aiafi	Independent	Faleata West	First
Leao Talalelei Tuitama	HRPP	Va'a-O-Fonoti	Third
Niko Lee Hang	HRPP	Individual	Second
Levaopolo Talatonu Va’ai	SDUP	Gagaemauga No. 2	First
Manuleleua Lalagofaatasi Falaniko Leleua	HRPP	Faleata East	First
Misa Telefoni	HRPP	Falelatai & Samatau	Fifth
Moefaauo Lufilufi	HRPP	Anoama'a East	Second
Motuopuaa Uifagasa Aisoli	Independent	Vaisigano No. 2	First
Muagututagata Peter Ah Him	Independent	Sagaga-Le-Usoga	Second
Mulipola Oliva	SDUP	Aiga-I-Le-tai	First
Mulitalo Sealiimalietoa Siafausa Vui	HRPP	Fa'asalele'aga No. 4	Second
Paepae Kapeli Su’a	SDUP	Aleipata Itupa-I-Lalo	First
Palusalue Fa’apo II	HRPP	Safata	Third
Pa’u Sefo Pa’u	HRPP	Fa'asalele'aga No. 2	Second
Safuneitu'uga Pa'aga Neri	HRPP	Gagaifomauga No. 2	Third
Sala Fata Pinati	HRPP	Gagaemauga No. 1	First
Sililoto Tolo Tua'ifaiva	SDUP	Vaimauga West	Second
Keneti Sio	Independent	Sagaga-Le-Falefa	First
Tapuai Sepulona Moananu	HRPP	Salega	First
Taua Falaimo	SDUP	Palauli West	First
Taua Kitiona Seuala	HRPP	Aleipata-Itupa-I-luga	Third
Tiata Sili Pulufana	HRPP	Fa'asalele'aga No. 1	Second
Toleafoa Apulu Fa'afisi	HRPP	A'ana Alofi No. 1	Fourth
Tolofuaivalelei Falemoe Lei’ataua	HRPP	A'ana Alofi No. 2	Third
Toluono Feti	Independent	Palauli	First
Toomata Alapati Poese	HRPP	Salega	Third
Tuia Pua Fuatogi Letoa	SDUP	Safata	First
Tuilaepa Sailele Malielegaoi	HRPP	Lepa	Eighth
Tuilo'a Anitele'a Tuilo'a	HRPP	Gagaifomauga No. 1	First
Tuiloma Lameko	HRPP	Falealili	Sixth
Tuisugaletaua Sofara Aveau	HRPP	Vaimauga East	Second
Tuu'u Anasi'i Leota	HRPP	Si'umu	Third
Unasa Mesi Galo	HRPP	Fa'asalele'aga No. 3	Third
Va'ai Papu Vailupe	Independent	Vaisigano No.1	Third
Vaeolenofoafia Tapasu	HRPP	A'ana Alofi No. 3	First

=== New members ===
Name	Party	Electorate	Term
Letoa Rita Pau	HRPP	Fa'asalele'aga No. 2	First
Muagututi’ a Siaosi Meredith	HRPP	Aleipata Itupa-I-Lalo	First
Papalii Samuelu Petaia	HRPP	Fa'asalele'aga No. 2	First
Patau'ave Etuale	HRPP	Faleata East	Second
Patu Ativalu	HRPP	Vaimauga West	Second
Vui Tupe Ioane	HRPP	Fa'asalele'aga No. 4	First
Ale Vena Ale	HRPP	Faleata West	Second?

=== Summary of changes ===
- On 6 April 2006, three independent MPs, Solamalemalo Keneti Sio, Muagututagata Peter Ah Him, and Lafaitele Patrick Leiataualesa joined the HRPP, increasing its seat count to 35 seats.
- Pa’u Sefo Pa’u's election in the Fa'asalele'aga No. 2 seat was overturned by a court petition on 2 August 2006. His daughter Letoa Rita Pa’u Chang was elected in a by-election for the seat on 25 September 2006.
- Mulitalo Sealiimalietoa Siafausa Vui's election was overturned by a court petition on 16 August 2006. The subsequent by-election for the Fa'asalele'aga No. 4 was won by Vui Tupe Ioane on 11 October 2006.
- Paepae Kapeli Sua's election was overturned by a court petition on 16 August 2006. The subsequent by-election was won by Muagututia Siaosi S Meredith on 11 October 2006.
- On 15 November 2006, following the departure of former leader Le Mamea Ropati and senior MP Sililoto Tolo Tuaifaiva, the Samoan Democratic United Party fell below the eight MPs required to be recognised as a party, and all its members have subsequently been treated as independents.
- Letoa Rita Pa’u Chang's election was overturned by a court petition on 4 December 2006. The subsequent by-election was won by Papalii Samuelu Petaia on 2 February 2007.
- Manuleleua Lalagofaatasi Falaniko Leleua died on 14 February 2007. The resulting by-election was won by Patauave Etuale on 23 April 2007.
- Sililoto Tolo Tua'ifaiva died on 9 March 2007. The subsequent by-election for the Vaimauga West seat was won by Patu Ativalu on 8 May 2007.
- On 14 March 2008, Muagututi' a Siaosi Meredith and Palusalue Fa’apo II resigned from the HRPP and became independent MPs.
- On 27 April 2008, twelve independent MPs including most of the former members of the Samoan Democratic United Party and two former members of the Human Rights Protection Party announced the formation of a new political party. Despite having sufficient MPs, the new party would not be recognised in the House. The party became the Tautua Samoa Party, ultimately with nine Members in Parliament. In May 2009, Speaker Tolofuaivalelei Falemoe Lei'ataua revoked the parliamentary membership of all nine of the party's MPs, on the grounds that joining a part after being elected "breached the provisions of the Electoral Act and the parliament standing orders". Their expulsion from Parliament would prompt by-elections. Party chairman Lealailepule Rimoni Aiafi stated that he would seek an interim injunction against the Speaker's ruling.
- On 18 March 2010, Lealailepule Rimoni Aiafi, Palusalue Fa’apo II and Va'ai Papu Vailupe refused to deny they supported the Tautua Samoa Party, and as a result were deemed to have resigned their seats and new anti-party-hopping laws. By-elections for the three seats were held on 14 May 2010, resulting in Fa’apo and Vailupe being re-elected. Lealailepule Rimoni Aiafi lost his seat to HRPP candidate Ale Vena Ale.
- On 2 September 2010 Satupa'itea MP Asiata Sale'imoa Va'ai died.
