= Politics of Samoa =

The politics of Samoa take place in a framework of parliamentary representative democracy whereby the Prime Minister of Samoa is the head of government. Existing alongside the country's Western-styled political system is the faʻamatai chiefly system of socio-political governance and organisation, central to understanding Samoa's political system.

From the country's independence in 1962, only matai could vote and stand as candidates in elections to parliament. In 1990, the voting system was changed by the Electoral Amendment Act which introduced universal suffrage. However, the right to stand for elections remains with matai title holders. Therefore, in the 51-seat parliament, all 49 Samoan Members of Parliament are also matai, performing dual roles as chiefs and modern politicians, with the exception of the two seats reserved for non-Samoans. At the local level, much of the country's civil and criminal matters are dealt with by some 360 village chief councils, Fono o Matai, according to traditional law, a practice further strengthened by the 1990 Village Fono Law.

The national government (malo) generally controls the legislative assembly as it is formed from the party which controls the majority seats in the assembly. Executive power is exercised by the government. Legislative power is vested in the assembly, but the government generally controls legislation through its weight of numbers in the Fono. The Judiciary is independent of the executive and the legislature.

== Executive branch ==
A Samoan government building in the capital Apia, housing administrative ministerial offices. On the roof is a modern version of a traditional oval Samoan fale.

Main office-holders
| Office | Name | Party | Since |
|---|---|---|---|
| O le Ao o le Malo | Tuimalealiʻifano Vaʻaletoʻa Sualauvi II | Independent | 21 July 2017 |
| Prime Minister | Fiamē Naomi Mata‘afa | FAST | 24 May 2021 |

The 1960 Constitution, which formally came into force with independence, is based on the British Westminster model of parliamentary democracy, modified to take account of Samoan customs. Two of Samoa's four highest ranking paramount chiefs (tama a ʻāiga) at the time of independence, Tupua Tamasese Meaʻole and Malietoa Tanumafili II, were given lifetime appointments to jointly hold the office of head of state (O le Ao o le Malo). Another paramount chief, Fiamē Mataʻafa Faumuina Mulinuʻu II was elected into parliament and became the first Prime Minister of Samoa. The fourth, Tuiaana Tuimalealiʻifano Suatipatipa II, was made a member of the Council of Deputies (deputy head of state). After Tupua Tamasese Meaʻole's death in 1963, Malietoa continued to hold the post of Head of State alone. He died in May 2007 and his successor, Tui Ātua Tupua Tamasese Efi was elected by the legislature for a five-year term in June 2007. At the time the Constitution was adopted it was anticipated that future Heads of State would be chosen from among the four tama a ʻāiga. However, this is not required by the Constitution and for this reason Samoa can be considered a parliamentary republic rather than a constitutional monarchy like the United Kingdom. Parliament (the Fono) can also amend the constitution through a simple majority of votes in the house.

=== System of government ===
The Samoa system is a very hard model of parliamentary democracy where the executive and the legislative arms of government are fused together. The prime minister is chosen by a majority in the Fono and is appointed by the head of state to form a government. The prime minister's preferred cabinet of 12 is appointed and sworn in by the head of state, subject to the continuing confidence of the Fono, which since the rise of political parties in Samoa in the 1980s, is controlled by the party with the majority of members in the Fono (the government).

The unicameral legislature, named the Fono Aoao Faitulafono (National Legislative Assembly) contains 49 members serving five-year terms. Forty-seven are elected from ethnic Samoan territorial constituencies; the other two are chosen by the Samoan citizens of non-Samoan origin on a separate electoral roll. Universal suffrage was extended in 1990, but only chiefs (matai) may stand for election to the Samoan seats. There are more than 25,000 matai in the country, about 5% of whom are women.

Le Mamea Ropati is the sole current member of the Council of Deputies, and acts as deputy to the head of state.

== Judicial system ==
The judicial system is based on English common law and local customs. The Supreme Court of Samoa is the court of highest jurisdiction. The Court of Appeal has limited jurisdiction to hear only those cases referred to it by the Supreme Court. Below the Supreme Court are the district courts. The chief justice of the Supreme Court is appointed by the Head of State on the recommendation of the Prime Minister.

Perhaps the most important court in Samoa is the Land and Titles Court of Samoa, consisting of cultural and judicial experts appointed by the supreme court. This court hears village land and title succession disputes. The court derives from the Native Land and Titles Commission put in place under the German colonial administration in 1903. Samoa's political stability is thought to be due in large part to the success of this court in hearing disputes (Source?).

The current Chief Justice is Satiu Simativa Perese. Previous chief justices have included Conrad Cedercrantz (appointed first Chief Justice in 1890), Henry Clay Ide (1893–1897), William Lea Chambers (1897–c.1900), W.L. Taylor, C. Roberts, Charles Croft Marsack (1947–), Norman F. Smith and Gaven Donne (1972–1974)

== Political history ==
=== Pre-European ===
- Until about 1860 Samoa operated under an indigenous political system, Fa'amatai, with no centralised government. Villages were ruled autonomously by their matai and aligned themselves into district and sub-district political entities for common causes – such as war. However, the leading paramount titles of all districts were nationally recognised. Before the Tongan invasion and occupation of most of Upolu and Savai'i, the highest nationally recognised titles were the Tu'i Manu'a from the Manu'a islands in the far east of the Samoa Islands chain, the Tui Atua from Atua and the Tui A'ana from A'ana (both on Upolu). The Tui Manu'a held the highest political power in Samoa and held political links with the Tui Tonga. Atua and A'ana were the predominant powers in Upolu and Savaii but acquiesced to the Tui Manu'a in the traditional hierarchy. When the Tui Tonga infiltrated the Upolu and Savaii, Atua and A'ana lost their pre-eminence in Samoan politics, only regaining it after the war against their Tongan overlords.
- However, after the Tongans were driven out, political precedence moved west to the highest paramount titles of Upolu and Savai'i. The strong links between the Tui Manu'a and the Tui Tonga greatly diminished the influence of Manu'a in Upolu and Savaii. Atua and A'ana regained their former glory, given their support of the Tuamasaga chiefs Tuna and Fata in driving out the Tongans. As a result of the leading role of Tuna and Fata in the war, the Tongans were driven out and subsequently gave rise to the Malietoa title, which arose from the shouted chants of the Tongan military commanders: "Ua Malie Toa, Ua Malie Tau!" (Brave warriors, splendidly fought).
- After the war of independence, the preeminence of the great titles of the ancient districts of Atua and A'ana was restored. However, the elite orator groups of Upolu and Savai'i needed a new power structure to defend the country from future infiltration of foreign invasion. The Tafa'ifa became the highest political office in Samoa west of Manu'a. The victory over the Tongans brought to power the Malietoa clan – a new force in Samoan politics. The first Malietoa title-holder – Malietoa Savea – led the government of Tuamasaga. However, the four highest titles in all of Samoa west of Manu'a (which remained politically independent) were collectively called the 'Tafa'ifa' (four-sided titles). These titles were the Tui A'ana from the district of A'ana, the Tui Atua from Atua, Gatoaitele and Tamasoalii from North and South Tuamasaga. The elite orators of Manu'a never recognised the legitimacy of the Tafa'ifa, but since the defeat of the Tui Tonga (their traditional ally), there was nothing Manu'a could do about the new political realignment that had taken place in the West.
- These four 'royal' titles were intensely fought over by the chiefly houses of all districts. In times when these titles were united in the same person, that person was ceremonially recognised as the Tapa'au Faasisina (supreme head) over all districts west of Manu'a (which was ruled by the Tu'i Manu'a). A woman – Salamasina – was the first such holder of all four titles and thus became the first Tafa'ifa ceremonial head or 'Queen' of the country. Her genealogical links to all corners of the country and to Tonga allowed her government (based at Leulumoega, A'ana) to maintain stability.

=== Pre-Colonial ===
- By the time Christianity came to Samoa via the London Missionary Society (LMS) missionary John Williams, Malietoa Vaiinupo was the holder of the Tafa'ifa. The two met at Sapapali'i village (Savaii) in 1830 where Malietoa converted to the new religion. This opened up Samoa for more Christian denominations, who promptly followed the LMS. Malietoa died with his mavaega (last wishes) being that the Tafa'ifa titles be held by four different people in an effort to keep the peace in Samoa. This wish never fully bore fruit. For much of the 19th century after Malietoa Vaiinupo's death, Samoa's clans again fought over succession to the Tafa'ifa titles in various civil wars as had been the case for centuries. This set the scene for the European Colonial powers to take sides, as the American, British, and German consuls played out their own political rivalries at the same time.

=== Colonial period ===
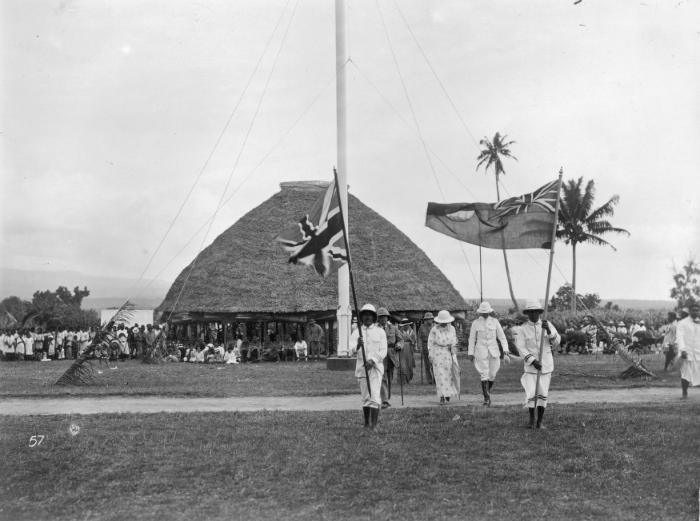
Colonel Robert Ward Tate, NZ Resident Commissioner of Western Samoa and retinue at Mulinuʻu, c. 1919–1923

Samoa has been described as "theoretically independent" prior to 1899.

- 1860 – 1889 Governed by Matai, directed by American, British and German consuls.
- 1889 – 1899 governed conjointly by "Three Power Pact" signed in Berlin in 1899.
- 1889 – 1914 Western Samoa becomes a German colony; Eastern Samoa becomes an American Territory.
- 1914 – 1920 Western Samoa occupied by New Zealand Expeditionary Force when World War I starts.
- 1920 – 1945 Western Samoa held and administered by NZ under League of Nations Mandate.
- 1946 – 1962 Western Samoa administered by NZ under direction of UN Trusteeship Council.
- 1953 – NZ offers progressive plan towards self-government and the first Executive Council is established.
- 1954 – The Constitutional Convention accepts the NZ plan for self-government.
- 1957 – A New Executive Council established, the Fono of Faipule is abolished, Legislative Assembly reorganized and enlarged.
- 1958 – NZ Reparation Estates are handed over to Samoan control and renamed Western Samoan Trust Estates Corporation.
- 1960 – The Constitutional Convention with 174 delegates (including ten expatriates) begins process of independence.
- 1961 – Adult Samoans vote overwhelmingly in a UN sponsored plebiscite to become independent.
- 1 January 1962 – Western Samoa becomes an independent sovereign state.
- 1970 – Western Samoa becomes a member state of the Commonwealth of Nations.

=== Modern political history ===
From independence until the 1970s, Fono debate was conducted in the typical 'consensus' style manner of the faamatai system in the villages. This meant due deference was usually shown to the Tama-a-Aiga within parliament (the highest ranking chiefs in the nation). Debate usually ended up with the members supporting the then Tama-a-Aiga prime minister or other highly ranked chiefs in the house. Fiame Mataafa Mulinuu II was re-elected as Prime Minister unopposed for most of the period between 1962 and 1975. There were no political parties in these consensus-style parliaments of the 1960s and early 1970s. In the 1970–73 parliament, the first woman speaker of the Fono was chosen – Leaupepe Faima'ala.

However, rising competition and differences in views between MPs in the 1970s led to the establishment of the first political party – the Human Rights Protection Party (HRPP) in 1979. The 1978 election was the first time a non-Tama-a-Aiga was chosen as Prime Minister. The election of Tupuola Efi to the prime ministership by his supporters was met with staunch opposition from various quarters of the Fono and caused huge controversy at the time because he had defeated a Tama-a-Aiga candidate. The HRPP was set up in part to oppose the then Prime Minister, Tupuola Efi, and also to demand greater rights for farmers. One of the founding members was Va'ai Kolone – a famous farmer turned politician from the rural Savai'i constituency of Vaisigano. Tui Atua Tupua Tamasese Efi eventually became Head of State in 2007 under his Tafaifa title Tui Atua and Tama-a-Aiga titles Tupua Tamasese.

From 1982 to 2021, the majority party in Parliament was the HRPP, save for a short period in 1985 when Va'ai Kolone leading a coalition of parties won the election but had to resign as MPs crossed the floor to the HRPP. Tofilau Eti Alesana regained the Prime Ministership after Vaai resigned. HRPP leader Tofilau Eti Alesana served as prime minister for nearly all of the period between 1982 and 1998, when he resigned for health reasons. Tofilau Eti was replaced by his deputy, Tuila'epa Sa'ilele Malielegaoi.

Parliamentary elections were held in March 2001. The Human Rights Protection Party, led by Tuila'epa Sa'ilele Malielegaoi, won 23 of the 49 seats in the 13th parliament. The Samoa Democratic United Party, led by Le Mamea Ropati, is the main opposition. Other political parties are the Samoa Party, the Christian Party, and the Samoa Progressive Political Party.

The March 2006 elections were again won by the HRPP by an even larger margin than 2001. The HRPP won 32 seats to the SDUP's 10, with a third major party – the Samoa Party – not gaining any. The majority of independents joined the HRPP to increase the party's majority to 39 seats in the 49 seat parliament.

Internal SDUP infighting led to the party's parliamentary members splitting. Leader Le Mamea Ropati was ousted in a coup led by deputy leader Asiata Dr Saleimoa Vaai, who then assumed leadership of the SDUP. Le Mamea and supporters became independents and thus reduced the SDUP's MPs to only 7. This was not enough to be formally recognised in the Fono as an official opposition party (they needed at least 8 MPs). Therefore, there was no official opposition party recognised in the Samoan parliament.

In 2020, proposed constitutional changes, including the removal of customary land courts from the oversight of the Supreme Court, generated significant opposition. The passage of these laws caused the creation of the Faʻatuatua i le Atua Samoa ua Tasi (FAST) party in opposition. The new party gained the support of some prominent political figures, including Fiamē Naomi Mataʻafa, who defected from the HRPP to FAST and became its leader. During the 2021 Samoan general election, FAST won 25 seats, equal to the number of seats retained by HRPP. The one remaining seat was won by the independent Tuala Iosefo Ponifasio.

These results, which would provide the parliament its first official opposition party in over a decade, were immediately disputed by the HRPP. On 20 April the Election Commissioner announced that a 52nd seat had been created and approved by head of state Tuimalealiʻifano Vaʻaletoʻa Sualauvi II, and given to a member of the HRPP. When the Supreme Court questioned this on 4 May, Sualauvi called a snap election for 21 May, declaring the April results void. However, on 17 May the Supreme Court ruled the 52nd seat unconstitutional. They also ruled the calling of a new election unconstitutional, and that the April election results would stand.

On 23 July, the Court of Appeal ruled that the FAST party had been the legitimate government since 24 May, confirming Fiamē Naomi Mataʻafa as the rightful Prime Minister from that date, thus resolving the constitutional crisis.

In August 2022, Samoa's Legislative Assembly reappointed Tuimaleali’ifano Vaaletoa Sualauvi II as the Head of State for a second term of five years.

== Political parties and elections ==
The Samoa Democratic United Party (formed after the 2001 elections) bringing together the Samoa National Development Party and the Samoa Independent Party) is led by the long serving Member of Parliament, Hon. Le Mamea Ropati Mualia. Other parties include(d) the Samoan Progressive Conservative Party, the Samoa All People's Party, and the Samoa Liberal Party.

== Administrative divisions ==
Samoa is divided into 11 districts:

- A'ana
- Aiga-i-le-Tai
- Atua
- Fa'asaleleaga
- Gaga'emauga
- Gagaifomauga
- Palauli
- Satupa'itea
- Tuamasaga
- Va'a-o-Fonoti
- Vaisigano

== See also ==
- Fa'amatai, chiefly system of Samoa
- List of colonial governors of Samoa
