= Valasi Toogamaga Tafito =

Samoan politician

The Honourable Valasi Toogamaga Tafito

Minister of Health
- In office 24 May 2021 – 16 September 2025 (Note: Disputed: 24 May 2021 – 23 July 2021)
- Prime Minister: Fiamē Naomi Mataʻafa
- Preceded by: Faimalotoa Kika Stowers
- Succeeded by: Vaʻaaoao Salumalo Alofipo

Member of the Samoan Parliament for Vaisigano No. 2
- In office 9 April 2021 – 3 June 2025
- Preceded by: Tapulesatele Mauteni Esera
- Succeeded by: Motuopuaʻa Henny Papaliʻi
- In office 26 April 1996 – 31 March 2006
- Preceded by: Seve Ropati
- Succeeded by: Motuopuaʻa Uifagasa Aisoli

Personal details
- Party: Human Rights Protection Party

Valasi Luapitofanua Toogamaga Tafito Selesele is a Samoan politician and Cabinet Minister. He is a former leader of the Samoa National Democratic Party.

Tafito was elected to the Fono as a candidate for the Samoan Democratic United Party in the 1996 Samoan general election. He was re-elected in 2001. In 2005 he was appointed party secretary. He lost his seat at the 2006 election.

In August 2020 Tafito was unanimously elected leader of the Samoa National Democratic Party (SNDP). Shortly afterwards the SNDP agreed an electoral alliance with the FAST party, which would see them run a single joint candidate in each electorate for the 2021 Samoan general election. In October 2020 he was nominated as a candidate for FAST. Preliminary results showed him winning his seat.

On 24 May 2021 he was appointed Minister of Health in the elected cabinet of Fiamē Naomi Mataʻafa. The appointment was disputed by the caretaker government. On 23 July 2021 the Court of Appeal ruled that the swearing-in ceremony was constitutional and binding, and that FAST had been the government since 24 May.

In August 2021 Valasi announced that the government was considering establishing an inquiry into the 2019 Samoa measles outbreak.

Prime Minister Mata‘afa called a snap election following the government's budget defeat in parliament on 27 May 2025. Following the dissolution of parliament, Tafito, Mata‘afa and the rest of cabinet confirmed their resignations from FAST and established the Samoa Uniting Party (SUP). During the 2025 snap election, Tafito lost his seat to independent Motuopuaʻa Henny Papaliʻi. Tafito's tenure as a cabinet minister ended on 16 September, and Vaʻaaoao Salumalo Alofipo succeeded him as health minister.

Papaliʻi resigned from parliament in January 2026 to join the FAST party, triggering a by-election in the Vaisigano 2 constituency. Tafito, having left the SUP shortly before, decided to contest the by-election and was nominated as the candidate for the Human Rights Protection Party.

== Notes ==
Assembly seats
Preceded by Seve Ropati	Member of the Samoan Parliament for Vaisigano No. 2; 1996–2006	Succeeded by Motuopuaʻa Uifagasa Aisoli
Preceded by Tapulesatele Mauteni Esera	Member of the Samoan Parliament for Vaisigano No. 2; 2021–2025	Succeeded by Motuopuaʻa Henny Papaliʻi
Political offices
Preceded by Faimalotoa Kika Stowers	Minister of Health; 2021–2025	Succeeded by Vaʻaaoao Salumalo Alofipo
