= 1996 Western Samoan general election =

- 26 April 1996

All 49 seats in the Legislative Assembly 25 seats needed for a majority
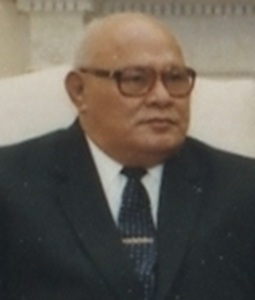

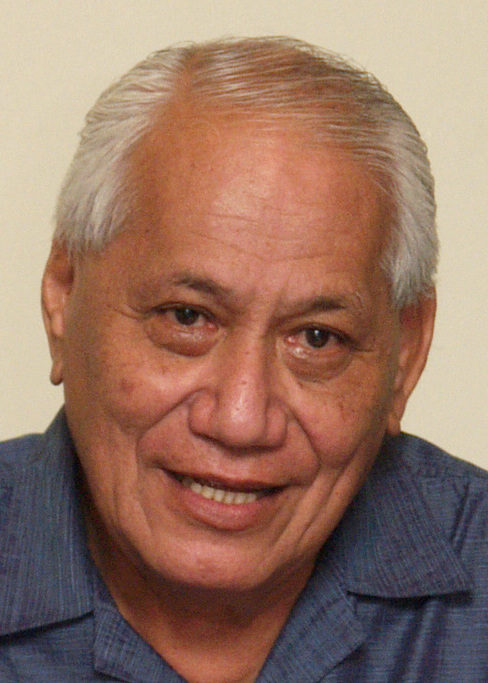
	First party	Second party	Third party
			WSLP
Leader	Tofilau Eti Alesana	Tui Ātua Tupua Tamasese Efi	To‘alepai Toesulusulu Si‘ueva
Party	HRPP	SNDP	Labour
Last election	49.58%, 27 seats	21.25%, 15 seats	–
Seats won	24	11	1
Seat change	▼3	▼4	New
Popular vote	29,353	17,586	773
Percentage	43.54%	26.09%	1.15%
Swing	▼6.04pp	▲4.84pp	New
Prime Minister before election
Tofilau Eti Alesana
HRPP
Subsequent Prime Minister
Tofilau Eti Alesana
HRPP

General elections were held in Western Samoa on 26 April 1996 to determine the composition of the 12th Parliament. The election occurred following constitutional amendments that extended the parliamentary term from three to five years and increased parliament's seat count from 47 to 49. Five parties contested the election, including the governing Human Rights Protection Party (HRPP), led by Prime Minister Tofilau Eti Alesana and the main opposition, the Samoan National Development Party (SNDP), led by Tui Ātua Tupua Tamasese Efi. The HRPP's popularity suffered a setback due to Chief Auditor Sua Rimoni Ah Chong's 1994 report, which brought to light government corruption. While the SNDP campaigned on anti-corruption, the party's perceived failure to provide checks on the HRPP meant the governing party faced few obstacles to re-election.

In the final results, no party won a majority. The HRPP won 24 seats, down from 34 before the election, the SNDP secured 11, and the newly formed Western Samoa Labour Party won a single seat. Independents saw a rise in support, with 13 entering parliament, reportedly due to many voters' disillusionment with both major parties. The HRPP and the SNDP negotiated with independents following the election to achieve a majority. The HRPP won the support of ten independents and remained in government. The Supreme Court later voided the election of five successful candidates, including four cabinet ministers and Labour Party Leader To‘alepai Toesulusulu Si‘ueva, after finding them guilty of bribery charges brought about by electoral petitions.

== Background ==
During the previous election held in 1991, the ruling HRPP, led by Prime Minister Tofilau Eti Alesana, won re-election with a simple majority of 27 seats in parliament. The opposition SNDP secured 15 seats, whilst independents won the remaining five. The election was the first to occur since the passage of universal suffrage in a 1990 constitutional referendum, granting all citizens aged 21 and older the right to vote. SNDP Leader Tui Ātua Tupua Tamasese Efi lost his seat; however, after filing a successful electoral petition, he returned to Parliament after winning a subsequent by-election. Prime Minister Tofilau appointed the first woman to cabinet in the nation's history, Fiamē Naomi Mataʻafa. At the dissolution of parliament, the HRPP had a 16-seat majority.

In January 1994, the government introduced a value-added tax on services and goods, sparking widespread protests. This bill also led to demands that Prime Minister Alesana resign. The demonstration concluded after two months when the government agreed to omit the most contentious aspects of the bill. The same year, Chief Auditor Sua Rimoni Ah Chong released an annual report to parliament that exposed widespread government corruption, including mismanagement of public funds. The HRPP government responded by suspending Sua, and were cleared of any wrongdoing by the Supreme Court in January 1996.

== Electoral system ==
At the 1996 general election, the Legislative Assembly was composed of 49 members, serving a term of up to five years. Amendments to the Electoral Act in 1991 added a seat to two single-member constituencies, increasing the parliamentary seat count from 47 to 49 and extending the parliamentary term from three to five years. Of the 42 constituencies, 35 elected a single member, while six of the larger constituencies elected two representatives and were entitled to cast two ballots. Two members represented the nationwide individual voters constituency and were elected by voters with either partial Samoan ancestry or those who were not ethnic Samoans. Eligible candidates were required to hold a Matai title (except for contestants of the individual voters' seats), be a citizen of Western Samoa and be an enrolled voter. Contestants must also have resided in the country for at least 12 months before the election. A further amendment to the Electoral Act in 1995 required candidates to disclose their party affiliation. Ineligible individuals included those convicted of a crime in Western Samoa and American Samoa and sentenced to at least two years or the death penalty. Civil servants were required to resign to contest the election.

With the introduction of Universal Suffrage in 1990, all citizens aged 21 and older had the right to vote. Voters could elect to enrol in a constituency rather than the one where they reside by right of significant family ties or matai titles. Individuals who wished to vote outside their constituencies on election day were entitled to cast a special vote. As prescribed by an amendment to the Electoral Act in 1990, voters required identification cards issued by the government to cast their ballots. A 1995 amendment to the electoral introduced an inquiry to occur on all enrolled voters during the revision of the electoral roll in the year of a parliamentary dissolution. Electors who failed to sign and return the inquiry forms risked being removed from the roll. A total of 77,964 voters registered for the 1996 election, an increase from 59,299 in 1991.

== Parties and candidates ==
In addition to the governing Human Rights Protection Party, led by Prime Minister Tofilau Eti Alesana and the opposition Samoan National Development Party, headed by former Prime Minister Tui Ātua Tupua Tamasese Efi, three other newly founded parties contested the election. Former Health Minister To‘alepai Toesulusulu Si‘ueva formed the Western Samoa Labour Party in 1993, which aimed to provide a more "effective" opposition, in contrast to the SNDP. Leota Itu‘au Ale, deputy leader of the SNDP, defected from the party in 1995 over a disagreement with the SNDP's leadership and formed the Samoan Conservative Progressive Party (SCPP). Meanwhile, in March 1996, HRPP MP Matatumua Maimoana left the governing party, citing the deterioration of the country's education system and alleged government corruption, and established the Samoa All People's Party (SAPP). She became the first woman to lead a Western Samoan political party since independence. The SAPP was notable for allowing individuals as young as 16 to hold party positions. Another party, the Samoa Liberal Party (SLP), was formed in 1993 by three former HRPP members who had been expelled from the party after voting against the aspects of the government budget that year. Shortly before the election, the SLP merged into the SNDP, which SLP Leader Nonumalo Leulumoega Sofara said was due to the two parties sharing similar policy views.

A total of 163 candidates contested the election. The HRPP fielded 57, while 42 were from the SNDP. The SAPP had seven candidates, while Labour and the SCPP each fielded a single contestant. The other 55 parliamentary hopefuls were independents.

Party	Leader	Candidates	Founded	1991 seats
Human Rights Protection Party	Tofilau Eti Alesana	57	1979	27 / 47
Samoan National Development Party	Tui Ātua Tupua Tamasese Efi	42	1988	15 / 47
Western Samoa Labour Party	To‘alepai Toesulusulu Si‘ueva	1	1993	Not yet founded
Samoan Conservative Progressive Party	Leota Itu‘au Ale	1	1995	Not yet founded
Samoa All People's Party	Matatumua Maimoana	7	1996	Not yet founded
Independents	—N/a	55	—N/a	5 / 47

== Campaign ==
Despite concerns about Prime Minister Alesana's health problems, especially as he only returned to Western Samoa just 12 days before the election after receiving treatment in New Zealand, he remained party leader. HRPP insiders viewed the prime minister's continuation as the party head as vital to preventing the possibility of infighting between his potential successors, including Deputy Prime Minister Tuilaʻepa Saʻilele Malielegaoi and his rival, Agriculture Minister Misa Telefoni Retzlaff, which would, in turn, likely cause the party to fracture. During the campaign, the HRPP emphasised its achievements in government. However, Chief Auditor Sua's report exposing alleged government corruption eroded the HRPP's popularity.

The SNDP pledged to establish an anti-corruption commission to introduce a code of conduct for the government ministries and their heads and investigate government corruption. The party also advocated for the repeal of the value-added tax along with introducing an accountable and transparent government financial system. The perception of the SNDP as an ineffective opposition, shared by much of the public, reportedly undermined the party's chances of ousting the HRPP government.

The Labour Party sought to deliver a more "effective" alternative to the SNDP and claimed their "mute" strategies had resulted in the HRPP attaining unchecked power. Anti-corruption and fulfilling the basic needs of citizens were central aspects of Labour's campaign, with Party Leader To‘alepai Toesulusulu Si‘ueva describing himself as "Moses leading his people to the promised land" and as a "future prime minister".

== Conduct ==
The dissolution of the 11th Parliament occurred on 22 March 1996, approximately 13 days before it was due to expire. Per the electoral act, voting commenced at 9:00 and concluded at 15:00; however, voters who were still waiting in queues by the time voting officially ended were handed special cards by polling staff, allowing them to cast their votes. Voting was reportedly orderly and peaceful, although there were delays with the tallying of ballots; the chief electoral officer said this was due to the significant increase in voters on the electoral roll.

== Results ==
Preliminary results showed the HRPP losing its 34-seat majority, leading in 23 seats, the SNDP led in 12, while independents led in 13. On the evening of the election, Prime Minister Tofilau Eti Alesana declared victory, claiming that some independent candidates had joined the HRPP. Following legal cases and judicial recounts in some constituencies, the official results were released on 15 May. The HRPP won 24 seats, down from 27 in 1991, confirming it had lost the majority it enjoyed before the election, although it remained the largest party. The SNDP secured 11 seats, a decrease from 15 in the previous election, while independents saw an increase, winning 13 seats. The only other party to win a seat was Labour, whose leader and sole candidate narrowly defeated Parliamentary Speaker Afamasaga Fatu Vaili. Two candidates won their seats unopposed, while four women secured seats. The less-than-ideal showings for the HRPP and the SNDP, along with a rise in support for independents, reportedly reflected much of the public's disillusionment with both major parties, which newly elected independent MP La Tagaloa Pita characterised as a "protest vote".

Party	Votes	%	Seats	+/–
Human Rights Protection Party	29,353	43.54	24	−3
Samoan National Development Party	17,586	26.09	11	−4
Samoa All People's Party	889	1.32	0	New
Western Samoa Labour Party	773	1.15	1	New
Samoan Conservative Progressive Party	359	0.53	0	New
Independents	18,454	27.37	13	+8
Total	67,414	100.00	49	+2
Valid votes	67,414	99.57		
Invalid/blank votes	294	0.43		
Total ballots cast		–		
Registered voters/turnout	77,964	–		
Source: Nohlen et al.

== Aftermath ==
Following the election, the HRPP and the SNDP began negotiations with independents, who held the balance of power, to form a government. Labour Party Leader To‘alepai Toesulusulu Si‘ueva claimed most successful independent candidates were vulnerable to "questionable deals" from both major parties, as they were "broke" due to the depletion of their finances from campaigning; there were no limits on candidates' campaign finances. The HRPP remained in government after winning over ten independents, regaining its 34-seat majority. Prime Minister Tofilau and his cabinet were sworn in by the O le Ao o le Malo, Malietoa Tanumafili II, on 19 May.

Some unsuccessful candidates filed electoral petitions after the election against their victorious opponents. Of the 17 petitions, 16 alleged corrupt practices on the part of the winning contestant, including bribery and treatment, while one disputed the validity of the results in a constituency. Seven petitions were withdrawn before any went to trial after petitioners and their opponents held customary meetings, along with their respective supporters. On the other hand, petitioners who failed to reach an agreement or did not meet with their rivals saw their petitions go to trial. The Supreme Court dismissed five petitions, while the other five were successful. Four cabinet ministers lost their seats after they were found guilty of bribery, brought about by petitions. Labour Party Leader To‘alepai Toesulusulu Si‘ueva resigned his seat after his opponent, former Speaker Vaili, filed a petition alleging bribery. The Supreme Court later upheld the charge and counter-charges against the former speaker. Overall, once the Supreme Court had processed all electoral petitions and all subsequent by-elections had occurred, the HRPP's seat count had increased to 35, the SNDP's remaining at 11, there were three independents and Labour was left with no parliamentary representation.

== See also ==
- List of members of the Legislative Assembly of Samoa (1996–2001)
