= Vaʻai Papu Vailupe =

Samoan politician (1944–2022)

Leader of the Tautua Samoa Party
- In office 22 December 2010 – 19 May 2011
- Deputy: Palusalue Faʻapo II
- Preceded by: Lealailepule Rimoni Aiafi (Note: As interim chair)
- Succeeded by: Palusalue Faʻapo II

Minister of Agriculture
- In office 1998 – 20 March 2001
- Prime Minister: Tuilaʻepa Saʻilele Malielegaoi
- Succeeded by: Tuisugaletaua Sofara Aveau

Minister of Justice
- In office 18 May 1996 – 3 June 1998
- Prime Minister: Tofilau Eti Alesana
- Preceded by: Fuimaono Lotomau
- Succeeded by: Molioo Teofilo Vaeluaga

Member of the Samoan Parliament
- In office 31 March 2006 – 2 May 2011
- Preceded by: Masoe Filisi
- Succeeded by: Tufuga Gafoleata Faitua
- Constituency: Vaisigano No. 1
- In office 5 April 1991 – 2 March 2001
- Preceded by: Aʻeau Peniamina
- Succeeded by: Aʻeau Peniamina
- Constituency: Falealupo

Personal details
- Born: 25 March 1944 Western Samoa Trust Territory
- Died: 17 January 2022 (aged 77) New Zealand
- Party: Tautua Samoa Party (from 2008)
- Other political affiliations: Human Rights Protection Party (until 2006)

Vaʻai Papu Vailupe (25 March 1944 – 17 January 2022), also known as Mafasolia Papu Vailupe, was a Samoan politician and accountant who served as a Cabinet Minister. He was the leader of the Tautua Samoa Party (TSP) from 2010 to 2011. His father was former Prime Minister Vaʻai Kolone, who co-founded the Human Rights Protection Party (HRPP). His younger brother Asiata Saleʻimoa Vaʻai was leader of the Samoan Democratic United Party.

== Political career ==
Vaʻai was first elected to the Samoan Legislative Assembly at the 1991 election. In 1996 he served as Parliamentary Undersecretary for Works, EPC, and the Water Authority. After being re-elected in 1996, he was appointed to Cabinet as Minister of Justice. Between 1998 and 2001, he served as Minister of Agriculture. He lost his seat in the 2001 election.

He ran as an independent in his father's old seat of Vaisigano No. 1 in the 2006 election. Shortly before the election he was shot in the neck in a politically-motivated shooting. His political rival A'eau Peniamina later denied responsibility for the shooting. Following the election he asked to join the Human Rights Protection Party, but was unsuccessful. In April 2008 he agreed with other independent MPs to form a new political party.

In December 2008 he became a founding member of the Tautua Samoa Party. As a result, in May 2009 he was one of nine Tautua MPs declared to have resigned their seats under an anti-party hopping law. He was subsequently reinstated after the Supreme Court of Samoa overturned the law and declared the formation of new parties legal.

In January 2010 new anti-party-hopping laws came into force, barring MPs from declaring their support for political parties or organizations with political aims other than the party they were elected for. In March 2010, he joined Lealailepule Rimoni Aiafi and Palusalue Fa’apo II in formally declaring his membership of the party and so was deemed to have resigned his seat. However, the ruling Human Rights Protection Party (HRPP) was unable to find a candidate for the resulting by-election, and on 2 May 2010 he was declared elected unopposed, becoming the first non-HRPP MP to win a by-election. In December 2010 he was appointed leader of the Tautua party.

Vailupe was re-elected in the 2011 election, but the result was overturned by an electoral petition, which disqualified him for bribery and treating. He was subsequently charged with thirteen counts of bribery. In May 2012 he was convicted on two counts of bribery and one of treating, and fined US$2500.

== Later life and death ==
In the wake of the 2021 Samoan constitutional crisis Vaʻai denounced the HRPP and its campaign against Samoa's judiciary.

Vaʻai died in New Zealand on 17 January 2022. He was buried in Vaisala, Savaiʻi.

== Notes ==
Legislative Assembly of Samoa
Preceded by Aʻeau Peniamina	Member of Parliament for Falealupo; 1991–2001	Succeeded by Aʻeau Peniamina
Preceded by Masoe Filisi	Member of Parliament for Vaisigano No. 1; 2006–2011	Succeeded by Tufuga Gafoleata Faitua
Political offices
Preceded by Fuimaono Lotomau	Minister of Justice; 1996–1998	Succeeded by Molioo Teofilo Vaeluaga
Vacant Title last held by Asiata Saleʻimoa Vaʻai	Leader of the Opposition; 2010–2011	Succeeded by Palusalue Faʻapo II
Party political offices
Preceded by Lealailepule Rimoni Aiafi as Interim chair	Leader of the Tautua Samoa Party; 2010–2011	Succeeded by Palusalue Faʻapo II
