= Olo Fiti Vaai =

Samoan politician

The Honourable Olo Fiti Afoa Vaai

Minister of Works, Transport and Infrastructure
- In office 24 May 2021 – 16 September 2025 (Note: Disputed: 24 May – 23 July 2021)
- Prime Minister: Fiamē Naomi Mataʻafa
- Preceded by: Tapunuu Niko Lee Hang
- Succeeded by: Toelupe Poumulinuku Onesemo

Member of the Samoan Parliament
- In office 9 April 2021 – 29 August 2025
- Preceded by: Constituency established
- Succeeded by: Leilua Sagato Karene
- Constituency: Salega 2
- In office 4 March 2016 – 9 April 2021
- Preceded by: Tapuai Toese Ah Sam
- Succeeded by: Constituency abolished
- Constituency: Salega East
- In office 31 March 2006 – 6 November 2015
- Preceded by: Faasootauloa Pati Taulapapa
- Succeeded by: Faasootauloa Pati Taulapapa
- Constituency: Gagaʻemauga 2

Personal details
- Party: Samoa Uniting Party (since 2025)
- Other political affiliations: Samoan Democratic United Party (until 2008); Tautua Samoa Party (2008–2016; 2016–2020); Faʻatuatua i le Atua Samoa ua Tasi (2020–2025)

Olo Fiti Afoa Vaai (formerly known as Levaopolo Talatonu Vaai) is a Samoan politician and former Cabinet Minister who served as the minister of Works, Transport and Infrastructure from 2021 to 2025.

== Personal life ==
Vaai was educated at Avele College and Samoa College before studying for a bachelor's degree in Telecommunications Engineering at Auckland University of Technology. He subsequently worked for the Samoa Airports Authority as a technical manager and then assistant chief executive. He is from a political family, and his uncle Leilua Manuao served as a Member of parliament for 40 years.

== Political career ==
Vaai was first elected to the Samoan Parliament in the 2006 Samoan general election as the MP for Gagaʻemauga No. 2, running as a candidate for the Samoan Democratic United Party (SDUP). Following the collapse of the SDUP in 2008 he joined the Tautua Samoa Party (TSP), resulting in his seat being declared vacant by the Speaker. The decision was overturned by the Supreme Court of Samoa in July 2009, and Vaai retained his seat. He was re-elected as a TSP candidate in the 2011 election.

In 2015 Vaai decided to switch electorates and contest the seat of Salega East in the 2016 election following a decision by his village to reject a tourism project he had proposed. As a result, he was disqualified from Parliament as he was no longer eligible to represent his old seat. He subsequently announced plans to form a new political party and contested the election as an independent, but after winning re-election he re-joined the TSP. When he switched electorates, he adopted a new title, becoming Olo Fiti Vaai. In the 2016 term he was a vocal critic of the government, being called a "One man Opposition Party" by the media. In May 2019 he was removed from the Finance and Expenditure Committee after criticising government spending decisions. In December 2019 he called on the government to launch an inquiry into the 2019 Samoa measles outbreak, saying "we failed you, Samoa".

In October 2020 Vaai registered to run as a candidate for the Faʻatuatua i le Atua Samoa ua Tasi (FAST) party in the 2021 election. As a result, his seat was declared vacant under anti-party-hopping provisions. On 14 December 2020 the decision was declared unlawful and invalid by the Supreme Court of Samoa.

On 24 May 2021 he was appointed Minister of Works, Transport and Infrastructure in the elected cabinet of Fiamē Naomi Mataʻafa. The appointment was disputed by the caretaker government. On 23 July 2021 the Court of Appeal ruled that the swearing-in ceremony was constitutional and binding, and that FAST had been the government since 24 May.

In June 2022, Olo announced that he would be suing opposition leader Tuilaʻepa Saʻilele Malielegaoi for defamation. Tuila'epa had previously alleged that Olo registered a government automobile as his private property, which the opposition leader claimed was the equivalent of theft. Olo said that comment dishonoured his family and constituency. In addition, Olo also filed a lawsuit against Maota o Vi'iga, a Samoan radio station based in Australia, for echoing Tuila'epa's claims.

On 15 January 2025 Vaai, Prime Minister Mataʻafa, and four other cabinet ministers were expelled from FAST, following a power struggle between Mataʻafa and party chairman Laʻauli Leuatea Polataivao. Vaai and the other expelled members rejected their expulsion, denounced it as unconstitutional, and claimed they were still members of FAST. Prime Minister Mata‘afa called a snap election following the government's budget defeat in parliament on 27 May 2025. Following the dissolution of parliament, Vaai, Mata‘afa and the rest of cabinet confirmed their resignations from FAST and established the Samoa Uniting Party. During the snap election, Vaai lost the Salega 2 seat to Leilua Sagato Karene of FAST. His tenure as the works minister concluded on 16 September, and he was succeeded by Toelupe Poumulinuku Onesemo.

== Notes ==
Legislative Assembly of Samoa
Preceded by Faasootauloa Pati Taulapapa	Member of Parliament for Gagaʻemauga 2; 2006–2015	Succeeded by Faasootauloa Pati Taulapapa
Preceded by Tapuai Toese Ah Sam	Member of Parliament for Salega East; 2016–2021	Constituency abolished
New constituency	Member of Parliament for Salega 2; 2021–2025	Succeeded by Leilua Sagato Karene
Political offices
Preceded by Tapunuu Niko Lee Hang	Minister of Works, Transport and Infrastructure; 2021–2025	Succeeded by Toelupe Poumulinuku Onesemo
Party political offices
New political party	Deputy Leader of Faʻatuatua i le Atua Samoa ua Tasi; 2020–2021	Succeeded by Laʻauli Leuatea Polataivao
