= Toleafoa Ken Vaafusuaga Poutoa =

Samoan politician (died 2021)

Member of the Samoa Parliament for Lefaga and Falese'ela
- In office 4 March 2016 – 19 January 2021
- Preceded by: Le Mamea Ropati
- Succeeded by: Masinalupe Makesi Masinalupe

Personal details
- Born: 1967 or 1968
- Died: 19 January 2021 (aged 53) Auckland, New Zealand
- Party: Human Rights Protection Party

Va’afusuaga Toleafoa Sauafea Kenneth Mark Va’afusuaga Poutoa (1967/8 - 19 January 2021) was a Samoan politician and member of the Legislative Assembly of Samoa. He was a member of the Human Rights Protection Party.

Poutoa was educated at Marist Brothers in Mulivai, St. Joseph’s College in Alafua, and the University of the South Pacific. He later became a businessman and director of the Samoa Shipping Corporation. He was first elected to parliament at the 2016 election. In 2018 he was bestowed with the Va’afusuaga title.

In January 2021 Poutoa traveled to Auckland, New Zealand, for medical treatment. He died there on 19 January.
