= Solomona =

Solomona may refer to:

- Solomona Sakalia (born 1991), New Zealand rugby union footballer
- Se'e Solomona (born 1965), New Zealand rugby league footballer
- David Solomona (born 1978), New Zealand rugby league footballer
- Malo Solomona (born 1987), New Zealand rugby league footballer
- Denny Solomona (born 1993), rugby footballer
- Tole’afoa Solomona To’ailoa, Samoan lawyer and politician
