= Mulipola Oliva =

Samoan politician

Leiataualesa Taupau Mulipola Oliva

Member of the Samoa Parliament for Aiga-ile-tai
- In office 31 March 2006 – 4 March 2011
- Preceded by: Leva'a Sauaso
- Succeeded by: Ifopo Matia Filisi

Personal details
- Party: Samoan Democratic United Party; Tautua Samoa Party; Human Rights Protection Party

Leiataualesa Taupau Mulipola Oliva (born 1974) is a Samoan politician and former member of the Samoan Parliament. When elected in 2006 he was Samoa's youngest MP.

Oliva is a former broadcaster. He was first elected to the Legislative Assembly of Samoa as a Samoan Democratic United Party MP in the 2006 Samoan general election. In August 2006 the SDUP collapsed following a leadership challenge against Le Mamea Ropati by Asiata Saleʻimoa Vaʻai. Oliva was initially appointed as Vaʻai's deputy leader, but withdrew his support a few days later, before claiming to support neither side. After the collapse of the SDUP he became a founding member of the Tautua Samoa Party, and in May 2009 was deemed to have resigned his seat by Speaker Tolofuaivalelei Falemoe Leiʻataua. He was reinstated by the Supreme Court in July 2009. In September 2010 he asked to run as a Human Rights Protection Party candidate in the upcoming election. He subsequently lost his seat in the 2011 election.

In July 2020 Oliva announced that he would contest Aiga-ile-tai in the April 2021 election as an HRPP candidate. He was subsequently banished from a number of villages in the constituency for unstated reasons. He came second in the seat, with 831 votes.
