= Fuimaono Naoia Tei =

Samoan politician

Member of the Samoa Parliament for Falealili
- In office 31 March 2006 – 4 March 2011
- Preceded by: Falealili Fuimaono Mimio
- Succeeded by: Tusa Misi Tupuola

Personal details
- Party: Samoan Democratic United Party; Tautua Samoa Party

Fuimaono Naoia Tei is a Samoan politician and former member of the Legislative Assembly of Samoa. Elected as a member of the Samoan Democratic United Party, she later joined the Tautua Samoa Party.

Fuimaono is a businesswoman and the daughter of the former Cabinet Minister Falealili Fuimaono Mimio.

She was first elected to the Legislative Assembly of Samoa in the 2006 elections, and was one of four women MPs at the time. In February 2007, SDUP deputy leader A'eau Peniamina left the party, and falsely claimed that Fuimaono had joined him. In 2009, she formally announced that she had joined the newly formed Tautua Samoa Party. In May 2009, she was consequently expelled from Parliament by the Speaker, due to a rule prohibiting post-electoral party membership changes. In July 2009, her expulsion from parliament was quashed by the Supreme Court of Samoa, who ruled that the formation of new parties by independents was legal.

She lost her seat in the 2011 election.
