= Va'aelua Eti Alesana =

Va'aelua Eti Alesana (died 30 September 2011) was a Samoan politician and opposition leader who served as a founding member and President of the Tautua Samoa Party in 2011.

He was the son of former Prime Minister of Samoa, Tofilau Eti Alesana. His sister, Gatoloaifaana Amataga Alesana-Gidlow, has remained a member of the ruling Human Rights Protection Party.

Alesana was elected President of the opposition Tautua Samoa Party in February 2011, a post he held until his death later in the year. He opposed Prime Minister's Tuilaepa Aiono Sailele Malielegaoi re-election bid in the March 2011 general election. However, Malielegaoi's was returned to office in the election.

Va'aelua Eti Alesana died in Samoa on Friday, 30 September 2011. The leader of Tautua Samoa, Palusalue Fa’apo II, said that "We are really saddened by this. He has done so much for the party." Alesana was buried in his native village of Lalomalava, Savai'i. In his eulogy, Palusalue Fa’apo II told mourners, "Va'aelua always maintained a positive attitude and before the General Elections last March, he kept encouraging the Tautua Samoa members to stay positive, despite the odds being stacked against us."

Party political offices
Preceded by Afualo Wood Salele	President of the Tautua Samoa Party; 2011	Succeeded by Leatinu’u Salote Lesa
