= 2010 Safata by-election =

A by-election was held in the Safata constituency in Samoa on 14 May 2010. The by-election was precipitated by the disqualification from the Legislative Assembly of Palusalue Fa’apo II for joining the Tautua Samoa Party. The election was won by Fa’apo.

== Candidates ==
- Palusalue Fa’apo II (Tautua Samoa Party)
- Auseugaefa Tuvaifale Va’asatia Poloma Komiti (Human Rights Protection Party)
- Manu'alesagalala Enokati Posala (Human Rights Protection Party)

== Results ==
2010 Safata by-election
Party	Candidate	Votes	%	±%
TSP	Palusalue Fa’apo II	979	35.8	
HRPP	Auseugaefa Tuvaifale Vaasatia Poloma Komiti	921	33.7	
HRPP	Manualesagalala Enkati Posala	836	30.6	
Turnout		2736		
