= 2006 Samoan general election =

← 2001	31 March 2006	2011 →

All 49 seats in the Legislative Assembly 25 seats needed for a majority
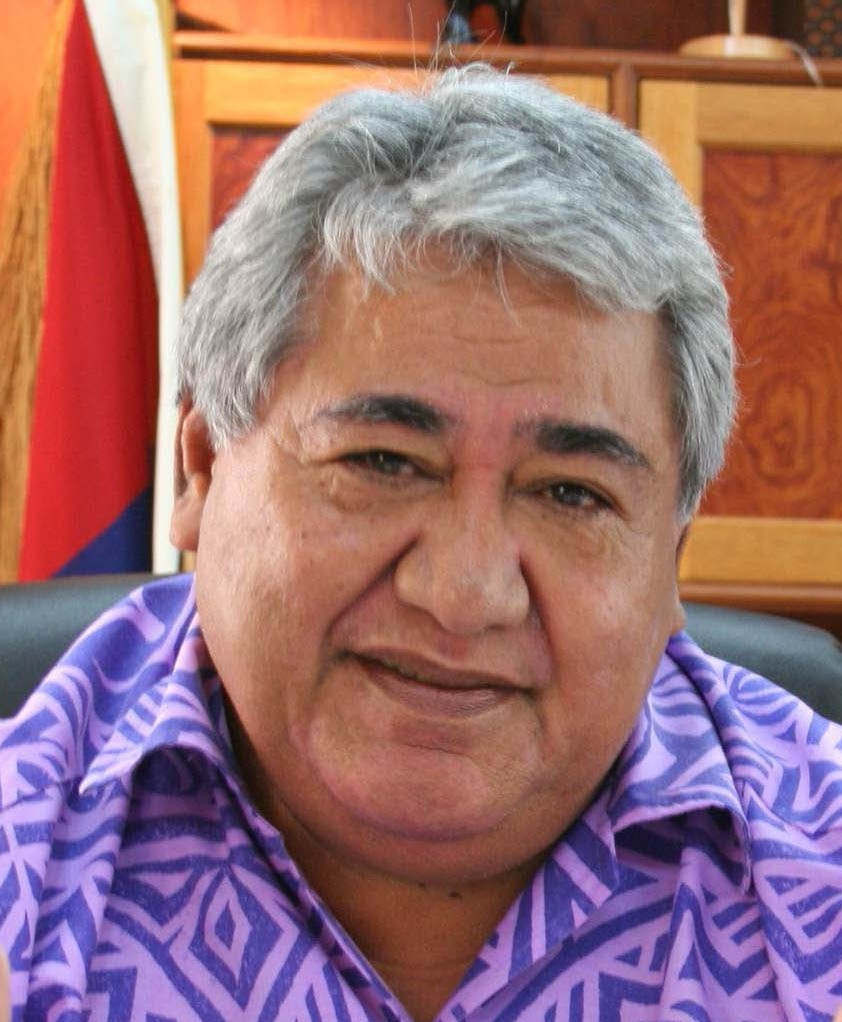

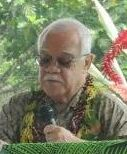
	First party	Second party
Leader	Tuilaʻepa Saʻilele Malielegaoi	Le Mamea Ropati
Party	HRPP	SDUP
Last election	44.82%, 23 seats	–
Seats won	33	10
Seat change	▲10	New
Popular vote	42,156	21,303
Percentage	50.20%	25.37%
Swing	▲5.38pp	New
- Results by constituency
Prime Minister before election
Tuilaʻepa Saʻilele Malielegaoi
HRPP
Subsequent Prime Minister
Tuilaʻepa Saʻilele Malielegaoi
HRPP

General elections were held in Samoa on 31 March 2006 to determine the composition of the 14th Parliament. The main contesting parties were that of incumbent Prime Minister Tuilaʻepa Saʻilele Malielegaoi, of the Human Rights Protection Party (HRPP); and the Samoan Democratic United Party (SDUP). In addition, three other parties, the Christian Party (SCP), the Samoa Party (SP), and the Samoa Progressive Party (SPP), competed in the election. The result was a landslide victory for the HRPP, which won 33 of the 49 seats. The newly founded SDUP secured ten seats, and the remaining six were won by independents. After the election, three independents joined the HRPP, increasing the party's seat count to 36.

== Background ==
During the previous Samoan general election in 2001, the incumbent HRPP won 23 seats but fell short of a majority to form a government. The opposition Samoan National Development Party (SNDP) won 13 seats, whilst the newly founded Samoan United People's Party secured a single seat, and independents won the rest. Le Mamea Ropati became the SNDP leader, following Tui Ātua Tupua Tamasese Efi's resignation. The HRPP was able to remain in power due to the support of independents. Following the election, certain independents formed the Samoan United Independents party (SUIP). In December 2003, the SNDP and the SUIP merged to form the Samoan Democratic United Party, with Le Mamea Ropati as its leader and Asiata Sale'imoa Va'ai, previously leader of the SUIP, as deputy leader.

== Electoral system ==
During the time of the 2006 election, Samoa's legislative assembly was composed of 49 seats, each serving a five-year term. 47 of the 49 members of parliament were elected from electoral constituencies, whilst the remaining two were elected through independent voters. Candidates were elected using First past the post voting.

Only Matai (chiefs) were permitted to contest any of the 47 constituencies, whilst the other two seats were open to all individuals. Once the final election results are confirmed, the leader of the majority party is appointed prime minister by the O le Ao o le Malo (head of state). The O le Ao o le Malo then appoints cabinet ministers on the advice of the prime minister.

== Campaign ==
The incumbent HRPP government campaigned on the economy, specifically on the economic growth of five per cent, which occurred in 2005. The HRPP also promised to continue development projects if re-elected. The ruling party pledged to proceed with developing roads, schools and the overall education system and tourism by upgrading hotels and advances in agriculture, specifically in crops and livestock. The party also emphasised Cultural preservation and vowed to construct more sports venues for the upcoming South Pacific Games. Tuila'epa predicted the HRPP would secure a two-thirds majority.

The opposition SDUP, on the other hand, led by Le Mamea Ropati, a former HRPP cabinet minister, attacked the HRPP for its past corruption scandals and highlighted the high cost of living. The SDUP pledged to remove the Value Added Goods and Services Tax from essential food items, which they said was the cause of a price hike. Le Mamea claimed that the HRPP would increase the tax if re-elected. The SDUP also attacked the ruling party for causing the national doctors' strike. This strike arose after the HRPP government began to implement a 42% salary increase for civil servants, which was to occur in a series of phases over three years but declined to raise wages for individuals in the health care sector. The Samoan Medical Association was also outraged at the government for this action since they had proposed an increase for doctors in 2004. Despite the SDUP scrutinising the ruling party for the strike, these attacks did little to lower the HRPP's vote count at the ballot box.

The Samoan Christian Party was led into the election by Tuala Falenaoti Tiresa Malietoa, the first woman to lead a political party in Samoan history and the wife of the O le Ao o le Malo, Malietoa Tanumafili II. The Christian party, whose executives were solely composed of women, sought to promote development in all sectors of Samoan society. Tuala stated "...from the beginning of time, the Samoan women have been free and uninhibited in our own cultural organisation. We bring in a new perspective and a new and a fresh attitude to national governance and national development."

The Samoa Progressive Party ran a single candidate, former cabinet minister Toalepaiali'i Toesulusulu Siueva Pose II. Toalepaiali'i criticised the HRPP government for its focus on roads when exports had decreased, which he said had the potential to undermine the benefits of road development. The party campaigned on prioritising education and catering to the needs of citizens, particularly mental and physical development.

The Samoa Party (SP) was founded and led by former auditor-general Su'a Rimoni Ah Chong. He gained international attention as auditor-general after exposing widespread corruption within the HRPP government during the tenure of former prime minister Tofilau Eti Alesana. The party focused on government reform and anti-corruption and intended to establish free education, which Su'a said would fulfil compulsory education. The SP promised to combat corruption by implementing a two-term limit for the premiership and restoring the autonomy of watchdog institutions as part of a "good governance" agenda.

== Opinion polling ==
=== Voting intention ===
Pollster	Date	Sample size	HRPP	SP	SPP	SDUP	SCP	Undecided
Samoa Observer	19 March 2006	200	54.0%	3.0%	7.0%	28.9%	2.5%	8.0%
Samoa Observer	19 February 2006	200	35.5%	9.0%	—	45.0%	—	—
Samoa Observer	14 January 2006	200	32.0%	6.5%	4.0%	43.0%	5.5%	9.0%

=== Preferred prime minister ===
Pollster	Date	Sample size	Tuilaʻepa Saʻilele Malielegaoi	Su'a Rimoni Ah Chong	Le Mamea Ropati	Other	Undecided
Samoa Observer	December 2005	200	27%	13.5%	40.5%	19%	4%

== Conduct ==
In December 2005, Tuila'epa announced that the election would take place on 24 February 2006. However, Tuilaʻepa later delayed the election and changed the date several times before settling on 31 March 2006. SDUP leader Le Mamea Ropati criticised the government for the date modifications and questioned if they intended to have an election at all.

Prime minister Tuilaʻepa proposed in January 2006 the introduction of a residency requirement of at least three years to be eligible to vote, which only applied to candidates at the time. Le Mamea dismissed the proposal as a "ploy" to undermine Samoan voters in other countries, which he said primarily backed the SDUP. Tanuvasa Isitolo Lemisio, the electoral commissioner, later confirmed that the current law, which permitted citizens and dual citizens residing overseas to vote as long as they were registered, would remain intact.

Campaigning ceased at 6:30 pm on 30 March, and polling stations opened the following day at 9 am local time.

== Results ==
The HRPP secured 33 seats, while the SDUP won ten and independent candidates won six. However, results in the Fa'asalele'aga 3 constituency produced a tie between the top two candidates, incumbent member Unasa Mesi Galo of the HRPP and the SDUP's Tofa Eteuati Si'itia, both with 356 votes each. Unasa prevailed following a subsequent recount.

Party	Votes	%	Seats	+/–
Human Rights Protection Party	42,156	50.20	33	+10
Samoan Democratic United Party	21,303	25.37	10	New
Samoa Party	4,509	5.37	0	New
Christian Party	548	0.65	0	New
Samoa Progressive Party	515	0.61	0	New
Independents	14,937	17.79	6	−6
Total	83,968	100.00	49	0
Valid votes	83,968	99.56		
Invalid/blank votes	372	0.44		
Total ballots cast		–		
Registered voters/turnout	79,284	–		
Source: Election Passport Election Guide Government of Samoa Psephos (Note: According to Adam Carr because in double-member seats voters cast two votes, it is not possible to give national aggregate votes by party.)

=== Results by constituency ===
Samoan general election, 2006: Vaimauga East (1 member)
Party	Candidate	Votes	%
HRPP	Tuisugaletaua Sofara Aveau	781	36.2
Independent	Maposua Fealofani	760	35.3
SDUP	Tofele Lata Tavui	587	27.2
SP	Tupuanai Avaioi Imoasina	29	1.3
Turnout		2,156	

Samoan general election, 2006: Vaimauga West (2 members)
Party	Candidate	Votes	%
HRPP	Anauli Pofitu Fesili	1,422	20.4
SDUP	Sililoto Tolo Tuaifaiva	1,322	19.0
SDUP	Patu Ativalu	1,286	18.4
HRPP	Taumanupepe Keleso	757	10.9
HRPP	Siligatusa Semi Lesa	618	8.9
HRPP	Tafemalii Suluvale Alofoe	579	8.3
SP	Letaa Tanielu	417	6.0
HRPP	Tuiletufuga Siaosi Tuiletufuga	284	4.1
SCP	Sagauga Sabu Utaileuo	109	1.6
Turnout		6,974	

Samoan general election, 2006: Faleata East (1 member)
Party	Candidate	Votes	%
HRPP	Manuleleua Lalagofaatasi Falaniko Leleua	331	73.4
HRPP	Lepou Petelo II	120	26.6
Turnout		451	

Samoan general election, 2006: Faleata West (1 member)
Party	Candidate	Votes	%
Independent	Lealailepule Rimoni Aiafi	795	32.4
HRPP	Ulu Vaomalo Ulu Kini	630	25.7
HRPP	Ale Vena Ale	545	22.2
SDUP	Panoa Easter Ah Kuoi	255	10.4
Independent	Seiuli Saoaumaga Lino	129	5.3
SDUP	Ulugia Aukuso Ulugia	98	4.0
Turnout		2,452	

Samoan general election, 2006: Sagaga-Le-Falefa (1 member)
Party	Candidate	Votes	%
Independent	Solamalemalo Keneti Sio	738	30.0
SDUP	Patea Satini Epati	555	22.6
HRPP	Leatupue Pili	365	14.9
HRPP	Muaiava Tuaitino Umu Toeava	343	14.0
HRPP	Faumuina Laneselota	270	11.0
HRPP	Polutele Solomona Matiu	75	3.1
HRPP	Moala Samasoni Pomare	72	2.9
SP	Tupai Kelly	38	1.5
Turnout		2,456	

Samoan general election, 2006: Sagaga-Le-Usoga (1 member)
Party	Candidate	Votes	%
Independent	Muagututagata Peter Ah Him	980	40.5
HRPP	Taliaoa Pita Ulia	658	27.2
SDUP	Fata Saifoloi	434	17.9
Independent	Luafatasaga Maanaima Sega	252	10.4
Independent	Saena Tialino Penaia II	95	3.9
Turnout		2,419	

Samoan general election, 2006: A'ana Alofi No. 1 (2 members)
Party	Candidate	Votes	%
HRPP	Toleafoa Apulu Fa'afisi	653	16.6
HRPP	Aiono Tile Gafa	531	13.5
SDUP	Maiava Visekota Peteru	460	11.7
SDUP	Suemalo Lipa Vaoga	420	10.7
Independent	Leaupepetele Denis Leaupepetele	386	9.8
Independent	Sauvao Taueva Sio Vaauli	363	9.2
Independent	Suafoa Fuimaono Lautasi II	334	8.5
SP	Semaoa Feausi	325	8.3
SCP	Fesolai Logomalieimatagi Tepa Toloa	222	5.6
SP	Leofo Aipovi Aiono	193	4.9
HRPP	Talamatavao Malua	49	1.2
Turnout		3,936	

Samoan general election, 2006: A'ana Alofi No. 2 (1 member)
Party	Candidate	Votes	%
HRPP	Tolofuaivalelei Falemoe Lei’ataua	425	36.0
SDUP	Tulilo Paulo Leutele	350	29.7
Independent	Agaseata Livi	119	10.1
SP	Lemaluafaitoaga Sauni Felise	104	8.8
SDUP	Amiatu Sagato Amiatu	92	7.8
Independent	Samoa Pita	90	7.6
Turnout		1,180	

Samoan general election, 2006: A'ana Alofi No. 3 (1 member)
Party	Candidate	Votes	%
HRPP	Vaeolenofoafia Tapasu	654	30.9
SPPP	Toalepaialii Siu Pose Salesa III	515	24.4
SDUP	Fagafagamanualii Theresa McCarthy	246	11.6
HRPP	Manu Taialofa Tuitofa Naseri	238	11.3
SDUP	Talimatasi Setu	187	8.8
HRPP	Aanamaaitu Pasitale Afamasaga	172	8.1
SDUP	Letelemaaana Talalelei	102	4.8
Turnout		2,114	

Samoan general election, 2006: Aiga-I-Le-tai (1 member)
Party	Candidate	Votes	%
SDUP	Mulipola Oliva	819	32.8
Independent	Vaatiuola Lautolo Misi	690	27.6
HRPP	Levaa Sauaso	498	19.9
Independent	Leiataualesa Vaiao	225	9.0
Independent	Taimalelagi Naotala	158	6.3
Independent	Lesa Tominiko Lesa Niko	80	3.2
Independent	Leiataualesa Niko Fidow	27	1.1
Turnout		2,497	

Samoan general election, 2006: Falelatai & Samatau (1 member)
Party	Candidate	Votes	%
HRPP	Misa Telefoni Retzlaff	852	76.2
Independent	Olomoutu Salapu Asalele	266	23.8
Turnout		1,118	

Samoan general election, 2006: Lefaga & Falese'ela (1 member)
Party	Candidate	Votes	%
SDUP	Le Mamea Ropati	1,114	55.5
HRPP	Masinalupe Tusipa Masinalupe	565	28.2
HRPP	Iputau Sami Lemalu	302	15.0
Independent	Taloaina Moana Tuala Tamalelagi	26	1.3
Turnout		2,007	

Samoan general election, 2006: Safata (2 members)
Party	Candidate	Votes	%
HRPP	Palusalue Faʻapo II	1,019	20.9
SDUP	Tuia Pua Fuatogi Letoa	897	18.4
HRPP	Auseugaefa Tuvaifale Vaasatia Poloma Komiti	867	17.8
SDUP	Seve Sung Chan Chui	756	15.5
HRPP	Leota-Suatele Manusegi Suatele	590	12.1
SP	Toeta Toafa	519	10.7
SDUP	Seve Leu Ruta Tofaeono	219	4.5
Turnout		4,867	

Samoan general election, 2006: Si'umu (1 member)
Party	Candidate	Votes	%
HRPP	Tuu'u Anasi'i Leota	679	56.9
Independent	Tupuola Tevaseu Mano Sola Siaosi Hunt	481	40.3
Independent	Afoa Fetulima Nonu	33	2.8
Turnout		1,193	

Samoan general election, 2006: Falealili (2 members)
Party	Candidate	Votes	%
HRPP	Tuiloma Lameko	1,186	20.5
SDUP	Fuimaono Naoia Tei	1,065	18.4
Independent	Tusa Misi Tupuola	931	16.1
HRPP	Fuimaono Puleimanufiu Faasopo	883	15.3
HRPP	Fuimaono Esera Rimoni	748	12.9
SDUP	Alaimoana Esau Ropati	480	8.3
Independent	Leilua Punivalu	218	3.8
SP	Talauega Lafi	106	1.8
Independent	Fuimaono Naoia Fereti Tupua	96	1.7
Independent	Fonoti Faagalu Taeao-o-alii	73	1.3
Turnout		5,786	

Samoan general election, 2006: Lotofaga (1 member)
Party	Candidate	Votes	%
HRPP	Fiamē Naomi Mataʻafa	481	65.1
SDUP	Fata Siaosi	257	34.8
Turnout		738	

Samoan general election, 2006: Lepā (1 member)
Party	Candidate	Votes	%
HRPP	Tuilaʻepa Saʻilele Malielegaoi	Unopposed	
Turnout			

Samoan general election, 2006: Aleipata-Itupa-I-luga (1 member)
Party	Candidate	Votes	%
HRPP	Taua Kitiona Seuala	676	66.1
Independent	Fuataga Kasimani	332	32.5
SCP	Lavatai Mailagi	14	1.4
Turnout		1,022	

Samoan general election, 2006: Aleipata Itupa-I-Lalo (1 member)
Party	Candidate	Votes	%
SDUP	Paepae Kapeli Sua	731	43.0
HRPP	Tautoloitua Farani Posala	627	36.9
HRPP	Utuga Faamanatu Faaaliga	258	15.2
SP	Tauiliili Joe Kolose Fruean	62	3.6
Independent	Letiu Elisapeta Tali Lee	23	1.4
Turnout		1,701	

Samoan general election, 2006: Va'a-O-Fonoti (1 member)
Party	Candidate	Votes	%
HRPP	Leao Talalelei Tuitama	369	24.5
SDUP	Togiai Fuatau Eteuati Faiilagi	365	24.3
Independent	Taito Aliifaalogo Faitele	348	23.1
HRPP	Leniu Fea Tionisio Seinafolava Hunt	269	17.9
HRPP	Leilua Tavas Leota	153	10.2
Turnout		1,504	

Samoan general election, 2006: Anoama'a East (1 member)
Party	Candidate	Votes	%
HRPP	Moefaauo Lufilufi	628	35.0
HRPP	Savea Sione	617	34.4
SDUP	Lealaisalanoa Francis Hugo Siliva Nickel	312	17.4
SP	Fogamomi Tomanogi Sapati Moeono	211	11.7
Independent	Faamatuainu Tala Mailei	28	1.6
Turnout		1,796	

Samoan general election, 2006: Anoama'a West (1 member)
Party	Candidate	Votes	%
HRPP	Fonotoe Pierre Lauofo	1,149	55.0
SDUP	Leota Leuluaiali'i Ituau Ale	834	39.9
SP	Manu Falaula	105	5.0
Turnout		2,088	

Samoan general election, 2006: Fa'asalele'aga No. 1 (2 members)
Party	Candidate	Votes	%
HRPP	Gatoloaifaana Amataga Alesana-Gidlow	710	14.7
HRPP	Tiata Pulufana Saunoa	707	14.6
SDUP	Tuilimu Manuele Paletasala	614	12.7
SDUP	Tofilau Tauvaga	437	9.0
HRPP	Fiu Loimata II	389	8.0
SDUP	Leauanae Makiasi S	352	7.3
Independent	Leaana Sosaiete	308	6.4
Independent	Pauli Taavili	302	6.2
Independent	Tofilau Saolele	271	5.6
HRPP	Pipi Samasina	264	5.5
Independent	Sili Alapati	177	3.7
HRPP	Leota Semisi	165	3.4
Independent	Tofilau Semeli Sinai	120	2.5
Turnout		4,834	

Samoan general election, 2006: Fa'asalele'aga No. 2 (1 member)
Party	Candidate	Votes	%
HRPP	Pau Sefo Pau	505	32.5
SDUP	Leasnapapa Laki	459	29.5
HRPP	Papalii Memea Samuelu Petaia	419	26.9
HRPP	Tuilagi Iakopo James Bartley	150	9.6
Independent	Namulau’ulu Vavae Tuilagi	23	1.5
Turnout		1,556	

Samoan general election, 2006: Fa'asalele'aga No. 3 (1 member)
Party	Candidate	Votes	%
HRPP	Unasa Mesi Galo	367	25.4
SDUP	Tofa Eteuati Siitia	361	25.0
Independent	Unasa Felise Moors	281	19.5
Independent	Sua Ioelu	195	13.5
HRPP	Tooala Tulouna	163	11.3
Independent	Toala Tanielu	77	0.5
Turnout		1,444	

Samoan general election, 2006: Fa'asalele'aga No. 4 (1 member)
Party	Candidate	Votes	%
HRPP	Mulitalo Sealiimalietoa Siafausa Vui	689	60.7
SP	Su'a Rimoni Ah Chong	436	38.4
Independent	Peseta Senio Lauvao	10	0.9
Turnout		1,135	

Samoan general election, 2006: Gaga'emauga No. 1 (1 member)
Party	Candidate	Votes	%
HRPP	Sala Fata Pinati	1,068	64.3
SP	Sala Vaimili II Uili Ioane	490	29.5
SCP	Tuala Falenaoti Tiresa Malietoa	103	6.2
Turnout		1,661	

Samoan general election, 2006: Gaga'emauga No. 2 (1 member)
Party	Candidate	Votes	%
SDUP	Levaopolo Talatonu Va’ai	393	41.9
HRPP	Faasootauloa Pati	388	41.4
SP	Toiaivao Faimafili Lauano	150	16.0
Independent	Saofia Omeli Sealiimalietoa	7	0.7
Turnout		938	

Samoan general election, 2006: Gaga'emauga No. 3 (1 member)
Party	Candidate	Votes	%
Independent	Galuvao Viliamu Sepulona	481	37.4
HRPP	Leota Lu II	464	36.1
SDUP	Seuamuli Sapio Tooala	255	19.8
SDUP	Maiava Faafuata	89	6.9
Turnout		1,285	

Samoan general election, 2006: Gaga'ifomauga No. 1 (1 member)
Party	Candidate	Votes	%
HRPP	Tuilo'a Anitelea	366	38.7
HRPP	Gaina Aukusitino	297	31.4
Independent	Peseta Toleafoa Lua Nafoi	254	26.8
SDUP	Gaono Silino	29	3.1
Turnout		946	

Samoan general election, 2006: Gaga'ifomauga No. 2 (1 member)
Party	Candidate	Votes	%
HRPP	Safuneituuga Paaga Neri	404	31.4
Independent	Sooalo Siliga	289	22.5
Independent	Faalafeitele Alofiotaoa Natuitasina Tugaga	277	21.5
Independent	Mamea Minnie lofa Tumanuvao Matalavea	109	8.5
SP	Feo Nemaia Esau	90	7.0
SDUP	Manuta Lavamaile	69	5.4
Independent	Fui Tifaga	49	3.8
Turnout		1,287	

Samoan general election, 2006: Gaga'ifomauga No. 3 (1 member)
Party	Candidate	Votes	%
HRPP	La'auli Leuatea Polataivao	593	60.9
SDUP	Segi Usufono Tauanae	294	30.2
SP	Polataivao Ila Matagi	77	7.9
HRPP	Polataivao Savelio	5	0.5
SDUP	Tupaimanaia Ioane	4	0.4
Turnout		973	

Samoan general election, 2006: Vaisigano No. 1 (1 member)
Party	Candidate	Votes	%
Independent	Va'ai Papu Vailupe	1,095	52.9
HRPP	Masoe Toga Potoi	802	38.8
SDUP	Lealiifanolevalevale Iopu Tanielu	154	7.4
Turnout		2,069	

Samoan general election, 2006: Vaisigano No. 2 (1 member)
Party	Candidate	Votes	%
Independent	Motuopuaa Uifagasa Aisoli	597	44.5
HRPP	Toleafoa Mauteni Tamasone Metuli II Esera	449	33.4
SDUP	Valasi Togamaga Tafito Selesele	297	22.1
Turnout		1,343	

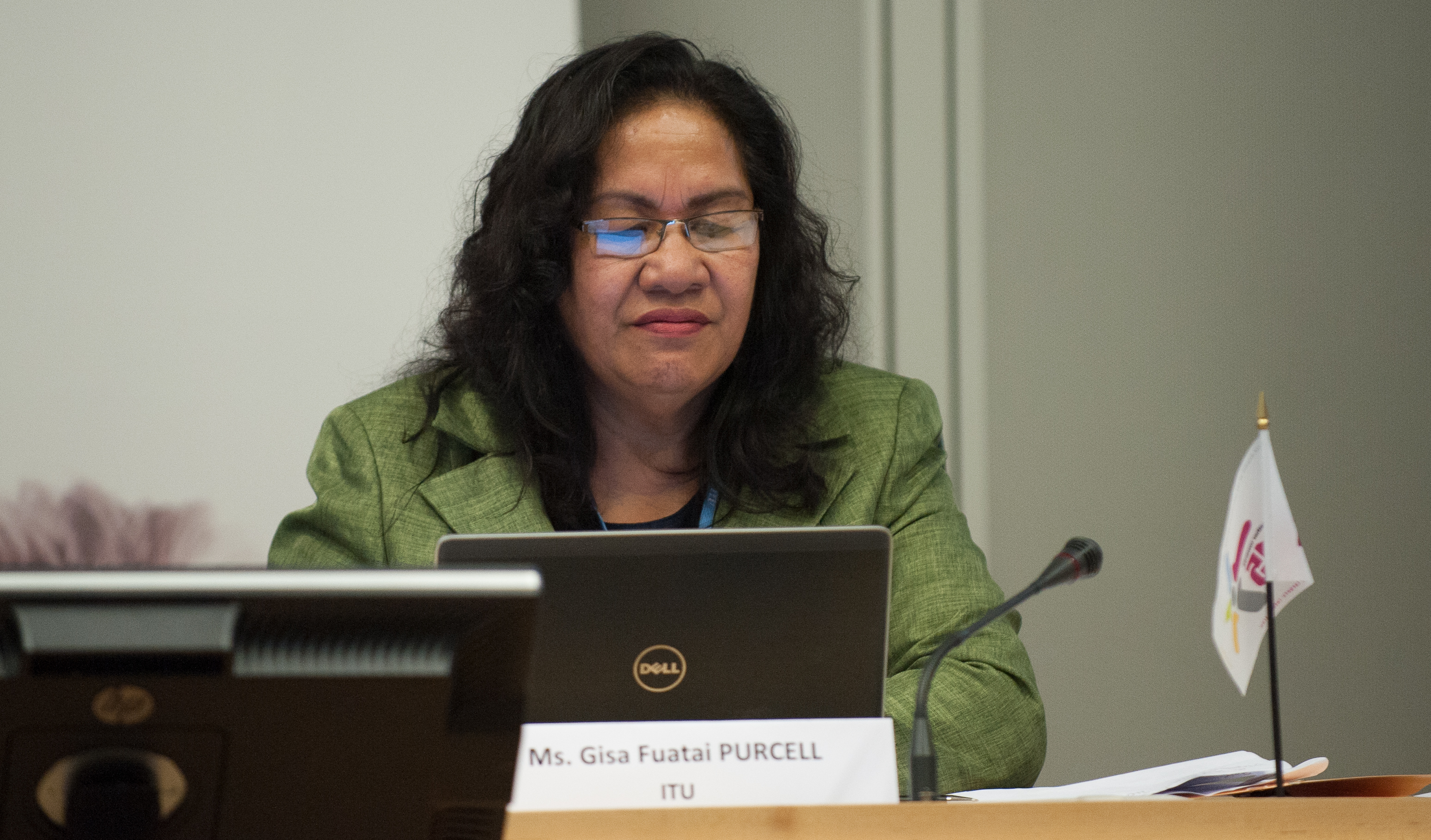
Gisa Fuatai Purcell

Samoan general election, 2006: Falealupo (1 member)
Party	Candidate	Votes	%
SDUP	Aeau Peniamina	634	73.1
HRPP	Solia Sefo Kalolo	167	19.3
HRPP	Gisa Fuatai Purcell	66	7.6
Turnout		867	

Samoan general election, 2006: Alataua West (1 member)
Party	Candidate	Votes	%
Independent	Lafaitele Patrick Leiataualesa	421	37.6
SDUP	Seuula Ioane	381	34.0
HRPP	Tuaiaufai Latu	256	22.8
SDUP	Lolomatausama Siuola	63	5.6
Turnout		1,121	

Samoan general election, 2006: Salega (2 members)
Party	Candidate	Votes	%
HRPP	Tapuai Sepulona Moamanu	861	26.9
HRPP	Toomata Alapati Toomata	781	24.4
SDUP	Leilua Manuao	626	19.6
SDUP	Tapuai Toese	417	13.0
SP	Muagutuia Mose	354	11.0
SP	Afualo Pule Afualo	162	5.1
Turnout		3,201	

Samoan general election, 2006: Palauli West (1 member)
Party	Candidate	Votes	%
SDUP	Taua Falaimo	681	37.8
HRPP	Afoa Faleulu Mauli	498	27.7
HRPP	Amituanai Tausisi	260	14.4
HRPP	Tamala Uilisone Leuluaialii	213	11.8
HRPP	Leilua Tutogi	148	8.2
Turnout		1,800	

Samoan general election, 2006: Satupa'itea (1 member)
Party	Candidate	Votes	%
SDUP	Asiata Sale'imoa Va'ai	591	43.6
HRPP	Selesele Tanielu Asiata	565	41.6
HRPP	Tavui Iose Gray	201	14.8
Turnout		1,357	

Samoan general election, 2006: Palauli (1 member)
Party	Candidate	Votes	%
Independent	Toluono Feti	585	36.7
SDUP	Laulu Ianeta Tui Laulu	544	34.1
HRPP	Leituala Tuuaga II	351	22.0
HRPP	Seumanufagai Pueleo	88	5.5
HRPP	Autagavaia Lave	28	1.8
Turnout		1,596	

Samoan general election, 2006: Palauli-Le-Falefa (1 member)
Party	Candidate	Votes	%
HRPP	Taua Falaimo	1,103	69.6
Independent	Le Tagaloa Pita	481	30.4
Turnout		1,584	

Samoan general election, 2006: Individual Voters (2 members)
Party	Candidate	Votes	%
HRPP	Tapunuu Niko Lee Hang	1,040	30.5
HRPP	Hans Joachim Keil	725	21.3
Independent	Wilson Edward Lotasiano	414	12.1
SDUP	Jensen Taimang	389	11.4
SP	Craig Farell	357	10.5
SP	Godinet Hymel Joseph	284	8.3
SDUP	Michael Edward Hunt	101	3.0
SCP	Silva Meleane Elaine	100	2.9
Turnout		3,410	

== Aftermath ==
Three independents decided to join the HRPP upon their electoral triumph, increasing the ruling party's seat share to 36.

Following the HRPP's victory, prime minister Tuilaʻepa promised to focus on the "well-being of the people". He expressed, "We have very little natural resources, so the yeoman asset is so important to us. We will concentrate on improving the education of our people as well as [their] health." Tuilaʻepa and deputy prime minister Misa Telefoni Retzlaff, were comfortably re-elected as leader and deputy leader of the HRPP respectively by the party caucus.

The results took the opposition SDUP by surprise, as polling earlier in 2006 predicted a comfortable victory for the party. Opposition leader Le Mamea announced that the party would assess how to proceed; the number of seats the party won was similar to that before the dissolution of the 13th Parliament. Le Mamea stated, "several weeks before the election we were right up at the top of the polls. Even myself as the preferred prime minister and the party as the ruling party. People needed a change. That is what I meant when I said we were very surprised. We did not anticipate this result."

The leader of the Samoa Progressive Party, Toalepaiali'i, blamed the opposition parties' losses on bribery on the part of the HRPP and claimed that prime minister Tuilaʻepa was knowledgeable about the matter. Tuilaʻepa denied these assertions and attributed his party's landslide victory to economic growth, as well as an alleged flawless record of improving the standard of living. He also stated that the opposition parties "had themselves to blame" for failing to attain more seats and said that the SDUP's attack strategy did not bode well for voters. Tuilaʻepa encouraged them to hold party conferences to analyse errors made in the election.

Ten candidates filed election petitions alleging various irregularities. Three of these were subsequently withdrawn, and five went to trial, of which three were eventually upheld. Fa'asalele'aga No. 2 MP Pau Sefo Pau was deprived of his seat after being found guilty of four counts of bribery and one of treating. The petitioner, Leanapapa Laki, was also convicted of ten counts of bribery. In Aleipata Itupa-I-Lalo, Paepae Kapeli Su'a was found guilty of two counts of bribery, while the petitioner was found guilty of three counts of bribery and three of treating. And in Fa'asalele'aga No. 4, Mulitalo Vui Siafausa was convicted of bribery after making a gift of fine mats to a village outside his constituency. The petitioner, Samoa Party leader Su'a Rimoni Ah Chong was also convicted of bribery for giving someone money and a television set. All those convicted were deprived of their seats and barred from standing in the subsequent by-elections.

The parliamentary session was officially opened by the O le Ao o le Malo, Malietoa Tanumafili II, on 30 May 2006.

== See also ==
- List of members of the Legislative Assembly of Samoa (2006–2011)
