= 2010 Vaisigano by-election =

A by-election was held in the Vaisigano No.1 constituency in Samoa in May 2010. The by-election was precipitated by the disqualification from the Legislative Assembly of Va'ai Papu Vailupe for joining the Tautua Samoa Party, and was scheduled for 14 May, However, the Human Rights Protection Party did not stand a candidate, resulting in Va'ai being elected unopposed.

== Candidates ==
- Va'ai Papu Vailupe (Tautua Samoa Party)
