= Asiata Saleʻimoa Vaʻai =

Samoan politician

Member of the Samoa Parliament for Satupaʻitea
- In office 2 March 2001 – 2 September 2010
- Preceded by: Gafa Ioelu Elisaia
- Succeeded by: Tavui Tiafau Tafu Salevao

Personal details
- Born: 25 May 1945 Vaisala, Samoa
- Died: 2 September 2010 (aged 65) Apia, Samoa

Asiata Alaelua Vaʻalepa Saleʻimoa Vaʻai (25 May 1945 – 2 September 2010) was a Samoan politician and lawyer. He was a Member of Parliament for the territorial constituency of Satupaʻitea and served as leader of the Samoan United Independents Political Party and the Samoan Democratic United Party. He was the son of former Prime Minister Vaʻai Kolone and the brother of Tautua Samoa MP Vaʻai Papu Vailupe.

Asiata was born in Vaisala on the island of Savaiʻi in Samoa. He was educated at Marist Brothers Primary, and later attended Victoria University of Wellington in New Zealand. After initially working as a law clerk, he became a solicitor for MacAlister Mazengarb Parkin & Rose in Wellington. In 1975 he returned to Samoa and founded a law firm, becoming the first local non-expatriate lawyer to do so. His cousin Lesatele Rapi Vaai later joined him in the practice. From 1978 to 1981 he worked for the Pacific Islands Forum secretariat in Suva, Fiji. He later served as president of the Samoa Law Society from 1985 to 1987 and of the Inter-Pacific Bar Association from 1998 to 2001. In the later 1990's he attended Australian National University, where he earned a PhD. From 1999 to 2001 he was Director of the Institute of Samoan Studies at the National University of Samoa.

Vaʻai was elected to Parliament in the 2001 election, representing the constituency of Satupaʻitea. He later became leader of the Samoan United Independents Political Party. When the SUIP merged with the Samoan National Development Party to form the Samoan Democratic United Party, he became deputy leader of the new party. He was a fierce opponent of the Human Rights Protection Party government, and in 2005 was suspended from parliament for four months for complaining to the Inter-Parliamentary Union about the HRPP's abuses of parliamentary processes. In August 2005 an IPU delegation recommended his immediate reinstatement, as well as other changes to Samoan parliamentary practice. Prime Minister Tuilaʻepa Saʻilele Malielegaoi greeted the recommendations with abuse.

He was re-elected in 2006. At the end of August 2006 he overthrew SDUP leader Le Mamea Ropati in a leadership vote. Ropati disputed the change of leadership, and eventually left the party. As a result, the party ceased to be recognised by the Samoan Parliament. The party subsequently fragmented. In August 2007 Vaʻai was charged with contempt of court after accusing the judiciary of bias over delays to a legal challenge to parliament's rules. He was found guilty in May 2009, but discharged without conviction.
