= Tapulesatele Mauteni Esera =

Samoan politician (1951–2021)

Member of the Samoa Parliament for Vaisigano No. 2
- In office 4 March 2016 – 9 April 2021
- Preceded by: Motuopuaa Uifagasa Aisoli
- Succeeded by: Valasi Toogamaga Tafito

Personal details
- Died: 8 December 2021 New Zealand
- Party: Human Rights Protection Party

Tapulesatele Mauteni Tamasone Metuli II Esera (1951 - 8 December 2021) was a Samoan politician who served as a member of the Legislative Assembly of Samoa from 2016 to 2021. He was a member of the Human Rights Protection Party.

Tapulesatele won a scholarship to study mechanical engineering in New Zealand, then worked for Samoa's Public Works Department and as an inspector for the Department of Labour. He later ran a bus service and an automotive business. In 2010 he graduated from the University of Otago with a master's degree in Indigenous Studies.

He was first elected to the Legislative Assembly at the 2016 Samoan general election. In parliament, he criticised Samoa's lack of teachers. He lost his seat in the 2021 election. He died in New Zealand after travelling there for medical treatment.
