= 2007 Vaimauga West by-election =

The Vaimauga West by-election was a by-election in the Samoan constituency of Vaimauga West. It took place on 6 May 2007, and was precipitated by the death of MP Sililoto Tolo Tuaifaiva.

Ten candidates contested the election, eight of them on behalf of the ruling Human Rights Protection Party. The election was won by Patu Ativalu. While previously a member of the Samoa Democratic United Party, Ativalu announced his intention to join the HRRP if elected, after a request from his village. Following the election Ativalu was accused of bribery and treating, but no election petition was filed.
