= 2026 Vaisigano 2 by-election =

- 27 February 2026
	First party	Second party
Candidate	Motuopuaʻa Henny Papaliʻi	Valasi Toogamaga Tafito
Party	FAST	HRPP
Popular vote	759	188
Percentage	80.15%	19.85%
MP before election
Motuopuaʻa Henny Papaliʻi
Independent
Elected MP
Motuopuaʻa Henny Papaliʻi
FAST

A by-election to the Legislative Assembly of Samoa was held in the Vaisigano 2 constituency on 27 February 2026. The by-election was triggered after the incumbent independent representative, Motuopuaʻa Henny Papaliʻi, resigned to join the Faʻatuatua i le Atua Samoa ua Tasi (FAST) party. Members of parliament in Samoa are required to vacate their seats if they change their affiliations during a parliamentary term, but are eligible to contest the subsequent by-election. Papaliʻi was challenged by his predecessor, Valasi Toogamaga Tafito, who was nominated by the Human Rights Protection Party (HRPP). Papaliʻi won the by-election in a landslide with 80% of the vote, while Tafito received 19%.

== Background ==
Independent candidate Motuopuaʻa Henny Papaliʻi won the electorate during the 2025 snap election. He defeated four other contestants, including Tagaloa Tupou Afa of the FAST party, who placed second, and the sitting MP, Health Minister Valasi Toogamaga Tafito, who ran as a member of the Samoa Uniting Party and placed fourth. FAST won a majority of seats at the snap election and went on to form a government under Prime Minister Laʻauli Leuatea Schmidt. In January 2026, Papaliʻi joined FAST, citing the wishes of many of his constituents, and subsequently resigned from parliament, triggering the by-election. According to the constitution, an MP's parliamentary membership is voided should they change their affiliation during a parliamentary term, and must contest a by-election if they wish to retain their seat.

== Electoral system ==
Elections to all 51 of the directly elected seats in the Legislative Assembly are conducted through the first-past-the-post voting system. Candidates are required to hold a matai title, be at least 21 years old, and have resided in Samoa for a minimum of three years before the nomination date. Individuals convicted of a crime in Samoa or any other country within the previous eight years, and people with a mental illness, were ineligible to stand as candidates. Civil servants were permitted to run as long as they resigned from their positions. Should civil servants fail to do so, the date of filing their candidacy is, by law, deemed to be the point when they relinquish their role.

Universal Suffrage took effect in 1991, permitting all Samoan citizens aged 21 and over the right to vote. Compulsory voting and mandatory voter registration were in place for the by-election. Electors who failed to vote were required to pay 100 tālā, while eligible individuals who did not register on the electoral roll before the deadline were liable to pay a 2000 tālā fine. As Samoa did not employ overseas voting at the time of the by-election, electors enrolled in the Vaisigano 2 constituency were required to be present in the country to vote.

== Candidates ==
Two individuals were nominated to contest the by-election. FAST chose Papaliʻi as its candidate, while the HRPP nominated Tafito, who joined the party shortly after leaving the Samoa Uniting Party.

== Conduct ==
The issue of the writ occurred on 2 February. The electoral roll closed on 6 February, the same day candidates nominations were open. Applications for electors to vote on pre-polling day were open from 7 to 14 February, while contestants had until 12 February to withdraw their candidacies if they intended to do so. Pre-polling was held on 25 February and the official count took place the day after the by-election, on 28 February. The return of the by-election writ is expected to occur on 2 March.

== Results ==
Papali‘i reclaimed the seat, winning in a landslide with 759 votes. Tafito, on the other hand, received 188. The electoral commission recorded only one invalid ballot out of the 948 votes cast.

Candidate	Party	Votes	%
Motuopuaʻa Henny Papaliʻi	Faʻatuatua i le Atua Samoa ua Tasi	759	80.15
Valasi Toogamaga Tafito	Human Rights Protection Party	188	19.85
Total		947	100.00
Valid votes		947	99.89
Invalid/blank votes		1	0.11
Total votes		948	100.00
Source: Samoa Observer, OEC
