= Le Mamea Ropati =

Samoan politician

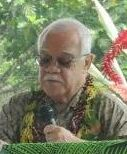

Member of the Council of Deputies
- In office 6 February 2016 – 7 January 2025 Serving with Tuiloma Pule Lameko (until 2018); Tuimalealiʻifano Vaʻaletoʻa Sualauvi II (until 2017)
- Prime Minister: Tuila'epa Sa'ilele Malielegaoi; Fiamē Naomi Mataʻafa
- O le Ao o le Malo: Tupua Tamasese Efi; Tuimalealiʻifano Vaʻaletoʻa Sualauvi II

Minister of Agriculture and Fisheries
- In office 21 March 2011 – 6 February 2016
- Prime Minister: Tuila'epa Sa'ilele Malielegaoi
- Preceded by: Taua Kitiona Seuala
- Succeeded by: La'auli Leuatea Polataivao (Note: As Minister of Agriculture, Fisheries and Scientific Research)

Minister of Education
- In office 1982–1985
- Prime Minister: Tofilau Eti Alesana

Minister of Lands Survey, Post Office and Broadcasting
- In office 1982–1982
- Prime Minister: Vaʻai Kolone

Member of the Samoan Parliament for Lefaga & Falese'ela
- In office 5 April 1991 – 6 February 2016
- Preceded by: Tuaopepe Fili
- Succeeded by: Toleafoa Ken Vaafusuaga Poutoa
- In office 24 February 1979 – 1988
- Preceded by: Vaafusuaga Poutoa
- Succeeded by: Tuaopepe Fili

Personal details
- Party: Human Rights Protection Party; Samoan National Development Party; Samoa Democratic United Party

Tuiletufuga Le Mamea Ropati Mualia is a former Samoan politician. He has served as a Cabinet Minister, Leader of the Opposition and member of the Council of Deputies. He represented the constituency for Lefaga & Falese'ela for over thirty years. He was a founding member of the Human Rights Protection Party.

Le Mamea was educated at Samoa College and later studied pharmacy at the University of Otago, graduating in 1970 to become Samoa's first pharmacy graduate. He worked as chief pharmacist at Cherry Farm Psychiatric Hospital in Hawksbury, New Zealand. He returned to Samoa in 1971 and became chief pharmacist at Tupua Tamasese Meaole Hospital in Apia.

== Political career ==
He was first elected to the Legislative Assembly of Samoa in the 1979 election. He was one of the founding members of the Human Rights Protection Party, and following the 1982 election was appointed to cabinet in the first HRPP government as Minister of Lands Survey, Post Office and Broadcasting. He subsequently served as Minister of Education, Youth, Sports & Cultural Affairs and Labour in the government of Tofilau Eti Alesana. As Minister of Education he established the National University of Samoa with an initial budget of $5. After the 1985 election he was not reappointed to Cabinet, and in December 1985 he joined ten other HRPP members in crossing the floor to support Vaʻai Kolone as Prime Minister. He was re-elected in the 1988 election, but subsequently convicted of nine counts of personation and lost his seat.

He was re-elected in the 1991 election, and following the 2001 election became leader of the Samoan National Development Party and Leader of the Opposition. He subsequently became leader of the Samoan Democratic United Party following its formation in 2003. He was reappointed as leader following the 2006 election, but in August 2006 was replaced by Asiata Sale'imoa Va'ai. In September 2006 he left the party to become an independent, resulting in the party no longer being recognised in parliament. He subsequently declined to join the Tautua Samoa Party.

Following a request from his village, he contested the 2011 election as a candidate for the Human Rights Protection Party. Following his re-election, he was appointed to Cabinet as Minister of Agriculture and Fisheries.

In June 2015, Le Mamea announced that he would retire at the end of the parliamentary term. In February 2016 he was elected to the Council of Deputies alongside Tuiloma Pule Lameko as Deputy Head of State. Following Lameko's death in 2018 he was left as the only member of the council.

== 2021 constitutional crisis ==
During the 2021 Samoan constitutional crisis, Le Mamea was approached by the winning FAST Party to swear-in Members of Parliament following the Head of State's decision to boycott the planned sitting of Parliament on 24 May 2021. A Supreme Court ruling upheld the Head of State's earlier proclamation convening Parliament however, the Head of State and former Prime Minister refused to uphold the court's decision. Le Mamea declined FAST Party's request and refused to swear-in the elected MPs. He has subsequently played no further part during the events that followed.

From 2018 to 2024 he was the sole member of the Council of Deputies. He was not reappointed in December 2024, and left office in January 2025.

In March 2026 Le Mamea was awarded a Distinguished Alumni Award by the University of Otago.

== Notes ==
Legislative Assembly of Samoa
Preceded by Vaafusuaga Poutoa	Member of Parliament for Lefaga & Falese'ela; 1979–1988	Succeeded by Tuaopepe Fili
Preceded by Tuaopepe Fili	Member of Parliament for Lefaga & Falese'ela; 1991–2016	Succeeded by Toleafoa Ken Vaafusuaga Poutoa
Political offices
Preceded by Asiata Sale'imoa Va'ai	Leader of the Opposition; 2001–2006	Succeeded by Asiata Sale'imoa Va'ai
Preceded by Taua Kitiona Seuala	Minister of Agriculture and Fisheries; 2011–2016	Succeeded by La'auli Leuatea Polataivao
Party political offices
Preceded by Tui Ātua Tupua Tamasese Efi	Leader of the Samoan National Development Party; 2001–2003	Party Dissolved
New political party	Leader of the Samoan Democratic United Party; 2003–2006	Succeeded by Asiata Sale'imoa Va'ai
