= Patu Ativalu =

Samoan politician (1941–2019)

Patu Ativalu Togi II

Member of the Samoan Parliament for Vaimauga West
- In office 6 May 2007 – 4 March 2011
- Preceded by: Sililoto Tolo Tuaifaiva
- In office 2 March 2001 – 31 March 2006
- Succeeded by: Anauli Pofitu Fesili

Personal details
- Born: 7 September 1941
- Died: 6 November 2019 (aged 78) Vaiala, Samoa
- Party: Samoan Democratic United Party; Human Rights Protection Party

Patu Togi II Ativalu Vaimasanu’u Tunupopo (7 September 1941 — 6 November 2019) was a Samoan politician and Member of the Legislative Assembly of Samoa. He was a member of the Samoan Democratic United Party and Human Rights Protection Party.

Patu was born in Vaiala. He worked for the Samoa Ports Authority, as a teacher, and then as a police officer, eventually rising to the rank of Chief Superintendent. He was a member of Samoa's rugby team at the 1963 South Pacific Games in Suva, Fiji.

Ativalu was first elected to Parliament as a member of the Samoan Democratic United Party in the 2001 election, but he lost his seat at the 2006 election He initially filed an election petition against the victorious candidate, Anauli Pofitu Fesili, then dropped it.

Following the death of Sililoto Tolo Tuaifaiva he contested and won the 2007 Vaimauga West by-election as a candidate for the Human Rights Protection Party. After the by-election, he was accused of bribery and treating, as well as accepting a US$25,000 bribe for withdrawing an election petition against the winner in the 2006 election, Anauli Pofitu Fesili. However, no election petition was filed.

He lost his seat at the 2011 Samoan general election.
