= Sua Rimoni Ah Chong =

Samoan politician

Su'a Rimoni Ah Chong (born c. 1954) is a Samoan politician and former Controller and Chief Auditor of Samoa. He was the leader of the Samoa Party. As the Controller and Chief Auditor, Su'a Rimoni's efforts against government corruption in Samoa earned him international notability.

From 1992 to 1995 he refused to authorise illegal payments to Cabinet Ministers as Controller and Chief Auditor. In 1994 he tabled an Annual Report to Parliament that revealed wide-scale corruption in the Human Rights Protection Party (HRPP) government under Tofilau Eti Alesana. The report implicated six out of 13 ministers in improper activities and payments. The government's response was to set up a Commission of Inquiry to discredit the Report.

The Commission looked not into the irregularities, but into the Chief Auditor himself. Included among the committee's members were several individuals criticised in his report.

In July 1995 the government suspended Sua. He then sued the Attorney General and the Legislative Assembly, stating that they had acted unlawfully by referring his report to the Commission of Inquiry instead of the Public Accounts Committee, and in particular that the former had violated Article 99 of the Constitution. As such in 1997 the HRPP amended the Constitution to make the Controller and Chief Auditor appointed for a term of three years, and to permit his removal upon motion of the government and a simple majority vote by Parliament. Prior to this amendment the position of Controller and Chief Auditor was like that of the Chief Justice, an appointment with life tenure until the age of 60 with the threshold for removal being a two-thirds vote of parliament.

The whole scandal brought Samoa into international scrutiny and questioned its commitment to good governance, as well as democracy and responsible government.

For his efforts, Su'a Rimoni was awarded the Transparency International's Integrity Awards in May 2003. The annual integrity awards recognize the courage of individuals and organizations fighting corruption.

In September 2005 Ah Chong founded the Samoa Party on a platform of restoring the independence of watchdog institutions such as the Auditor-General. During the 2006 Samoan general election, it did not secure any seats. Following the election, Ah Chong was banished from his village for filing an election petition against winning candidate Mulitalo Siafausa Vui. The ban was subsequently overturned by the Supreme Court of Samoa, but this was ignored by the village council. When his election petition was successful, Ah Chong's house was burned down, and the government brought criminal charges of bribery and treating against him. He was subsequently convicted of bribery for giving a member of his extended family a new TV set., and returned his Transparency International Award.

In 2011 he ran as a candidate for the Tautua Samoa Party.

Su'a Rimoni is of Chinese-Samoan heritage.
