= Aʻeau Peniamina =

Samoan politician (1942–2025)

Speaker of the Legislative Assembly of Samoa
- In office 1988–1991
- Preceded by: Nonumalo Nanai Leulumoega Sofara
- Succeeded by: Fatu Vaili Afamasaga

Member of the Samoan Parliament for Falealupo
- In office 2 March 2001 – 8 April 2021
- Preceded by: Mafasolia Papu Vailupe
- Succeeded by: Leota Tima Leavai
- In office 22 February 1985 – 5 April 1991
- Preceded by: Lamusitele Sio
- Succeeded by: Mafasolia Papu Vailupe

Personal details
- Born: 1942
- Died: 7 May 2025 (aged 82)
- Party: Tautua Samoa Party (2008–2025)
- Other political affiliations: Samoan Democratic United Party (2003–2008); Samoan National Development Party (2001–2003); Human Rights Protection Party (until 2001)

Aʻeau Peniamina Leʻavai (1942 – 7 May 2025) was a Samoan politician and matai. He served as the Speaker of the Samoan Legislative Assembly from 1988 to 1991. He was a member of the Tautua Samoa Party.

== Life and career ==
Peniamina was educated at Fiji School of Medicine and the University of London and later worked as a dentist. He was first elected to Parliament as a member of the Human Rights Protection Party in the 1985 general election. He was re-elected in 1988, and served as Speaker of the Assembly from 1988 to 1991, before losing his seat at the 1991 election.

Peniamina was banished from his village after announcing his intention to run as a candidate for the Samoan National Development Party at the 2001 election. He was elected despite this, and was the opposition's candidate for Speaker, but was defeated by 28 votes to 21.

He was re-elected again in 2006 as a candidate for the Samoan Democratic United Party (SDUP). In 2005, Peniamina was accused of racism over remarks he made about Chinese immigrants but later moderated his comments. In November 2006 he was elected deputy leader of the SDUP. Following a split in the SDUP, the party was no longer recognized, and he became an independent MP. He subsequently joined other independents in establishing the Tautua Samoa Party. In December 2007, he denied involvement in an incident in which fellow opposition MP (and former rival for the Falealupo seat) Mafasolia Papu Va'ai was shot and wounded.

Peniamina ran as a Tautua candidate at the 2011 election and was re-elected. He was subsequently elected deputy leader of the party. He was re-elected again at the 2016 election, as one of only three opposition MPs.

He retired at the 2021 election. His seat was won by his daughter, Leota Tima Leavai.

Peniamina died on 7 May 2025, at the age of 82.

Legislative Assembly of Samoa
Preceded by Lamusitele Sio	Member of Parliament for Falealupo; 1985–1991	Succeeded by Mafasolia Papu Vailupe
Preceded by Nonumalo Nanai Leulumoega Sofara	Speaker of the Legislative Assembly of Samoa; 1988–1991	Succeeded by Fatu Vaili Afamasaga
Preceded by Mafasolia Papu Vailupe	Member of Parliament for Falealupo; 2001–2021	Succeeded by Leota Tima Leavai
Party political offices
Preceded by Palusalue Faʻapo II	Deputy Leader of the Tautua Samoa Party; 2011–2016	Vacant
