= Manu'alesagalala Enokati Posala =

Samoan politician

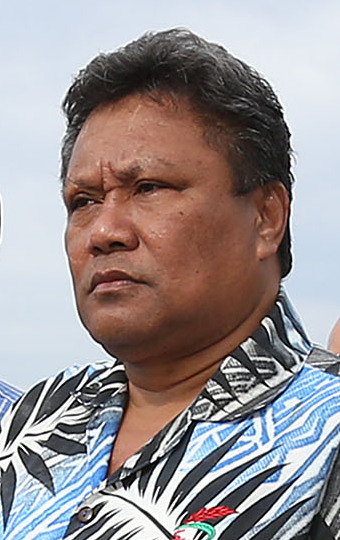
- Manu'alesagalala in 2014

Minister of Works Transport and Infrastructure
- In office 21 March 2011 – 18 March 2016
- Preceded by: Tuisugaletaua Sofara Aveau
- Succeeded by: Tapunuu Niko Lee Hang

Member of the Samoa Parliament for Safata
- In office 4 March 2011 – 4 March 2016
- Preceded by: Tuia Pua Fuatogi Letoa
- Succeeded by: None (Seat split)

Personal details
- Party: Human Rights Protection Party

Manu'alesagalala Enokati Posala is a Samoan politician and former Cabinet minister. He is a member of the Human Rights Protection Party.

Manu'alesagalala stood unsuccessfully in the 2010 Safata by-election. He was first elected to the Legislative Assembly of Samoa in the 2011 Samoan general election and appointed Minister of Works, Transport and Infrastructure. Shortly after being elected, he was accused of bribery in an election petition but the petition was later dropped.

In the 2016 election, the two-member seat of Safata was divided into two single-seat constituencies. Manu'alesagalala ran against the opposition leader and fellow incumbent Palusalue Faʻapo II for Safata West, but both were defeated by Leaana Ronnie Posini.
