= Samoa Party =

Defunct Samoan political party

The Samoa Party was a small party of Samoa. The party was founded in September 2005 by former auditor-general Su'a Rimoni Ah Chong on a platform of restoring the independence of watchdog institutions such as the Auditor-General. The party also aimed to provide free education, and impose a term limit on future Prime Ministers of two terms. During the 2006 Samoan general election, it did not secure any seats.

The party was disbanded in September 2010 and merged with the Tautua Samoa Party. Samoa Party leader Feo Nemaia Esau explained that the merger would form a more "united opposition" to the ruling Human Rights Protection Party.
