= Tumua ma Puleono =

Samoan political party

- Secretary: John Malaeolevavau Peterson
- Founder: John Malaeolevavau Peterson
- Founded: 25 May 2020
- Dissolved: 7 March 2023
- Ideology: Anti-Land and Titles Bill; Non-matai interests

Website
- tumuamapuleono.com

Tumua ma Puleono was a political party in Samoa. The party is named for the traditional honorifics of Upolu and Savaii, the two main islands of Samoa. Its secretary was John Peterson.

The party opposed controversial constitutional amendments proposed by the Human Rights Protection Party government of Tuilaʻepa Saʻilele Malielegaoi and advocated for a greater voice for non-matai. It contested the 2021 Samoan general election. As of 29 August 2020 the party had recruited three candidates to contest seats for it.

On 2 September 2020 the party announced it would join forces with the Faʻatuatua i le Atua Samoa ua Tasi and Samoa National Democratic Party parties to contest the 2021 election. SNDP and Tumua ma Puleono candidates ran under the FAST banner, with only one candidate in each constituency.

The party was deregistered on 7 March 2023 after failing to pay the annual registration fee.
