= Temokalasi Samoa Faʻamatai =

Samoan political party

The Temokalasi Samoa Faʻamatai or Samoan Democracy of Matai (TSFPP) was a political party in Samoa. It was founded in January 1993 by Le Tagaloa Pita. The party opposed universal suffrage and argued that only matai (traditional heads of families) should have the vote. It also opposed the introduction of value-added goods and services tax to Samoa.
