= Samoa Progressive Political Party =

The Samoa Progressive Political Party was a small political party in Samoa. The party was launched in January 2006 and led by former Cabinet Minister Toalepaiali’i Toesulusulu Siueva Pose II. The party ran a single candidate in the 2006 election, but failed to win a seat. To'alepaialii blamed his election loss on bribery, and subsequently had the families of those who did not vote for him banished from his village. He then claimed to have entered an arrangement with the victorious candidate Vaeolenofoafia Tapasu Leung Wai in which he would accept $30,000 in exchange for not filing an electoral petition, and complained of underpayment.
