= Toleʻafoa Solomona Toʻailoa =

Samoan lawyer

Toleʻafoa Solomona Toʻailoa (also known as Maposua Solomona Toailoa) is a Samoan lawyer and politician. Toʻailoa gained notability as chairman of People Against Switching Sides (PASS), an organisation dedicated to campaigning against government legislation on changing the side of the road vehicles would drive on, which received significant media coverage in Samoa, as well as some coverage in Australia and New Zealand. PASS notably organised two protest marches, "the largest demonstrations in the nation's history".

In July 2008, Toʻailoa co-founded the People's Party, which grew out of PASS. In November, he was elected as the party's president, and confirmed that he would be running for Parliament, from the Vaimauga East constituency, in the 2011 general election. He contested the election, but was unsuccessful.
