= Palusalue Faʻapo II =

Samoan politician

Leader of the Tautua Samoa Party
- In office 19 May 2011 – 4 March 2016
- Deputy: A'eau Peniamina
- Preceded by: Va'ai Papu Vailupe
- Succeeded by: Office vacant

Minister of Communication & Information Technology
- In office 2003 – 24 April 2006
- Prime Minister: Tuilaʻepa Saʻilele Malielegaoi
- Succeeded by: Mulitalo Siafausa Vui

Minister of Transport
- In office 20 March 2001 – 2003

Member of the Samoan Parliament for Safata
- In office 26 April 1996 – 4 March 2016
- Preceded by: Tuiloma Pule Lameko
- Succeeded by: Constituency abolished

Personal details
- Born: ~1956 (age 69–70)
- Party: FAST (2020–present)
- Other political affiliations: HRPP (until 2008); Tautua Samoa Party (2008–2020)

Afemata Palusalue Faʻapo II (born ~1956) is a Samoan politician and former Cabinet Minister. From 2011 to 2016 he was the leader of the opposition Tautua Samoa Party.

Palusalue was first elected to Parliament in 1996. He served as Parliamentary Undersecretary to the Minister of Justice. After being re-elected in 2001, he was appointed to Cabinet, first as Minister of Transport and Civil Aviation, and then as Minister of Communication & Information Technology. After the 2006 election he became associate Minister of Finance.

Palusalue left the governing Human Rights Protection Party in March 2008 and joined the opposition as an independent MP. He later became a founding member of the Tautua Samoa Party. As a result, in May 2009 he was one of nine Tautua MPs declared to have resigned their seats under an anti-party hopping law. He was subsequently reinstated after the Supreme Court of Samoa overturned the law and declared the formation of new parties legal.

In January 2010 new anti-party-hopping laws came into force, barring MPs from declaring their support for political parties or organizations with political aims other than the party they were elected for. As a result, along with Lealailepule Rimoni Aiafi and Va'ai Papu Vailupe he was deemed to have resigned his seat. He was re-elected in the resulting by-election. In December 2010 he was elected deputy leader of Tautua. He was re-elected in the 2011 election and re-elected deputy leader. Following Va'ai Papu Vailupe's loss of his seat for bribery and treating he became party leader. He lost his seat in the 2016 election.

In 2017 he was conferred with the chiefly title of Afemata.

He contested the 2021 election as a candidate for the Faʻatuatua i le Atua Samoa ua Tasi (FAST) party but was unsuccessful.

In February 2023, the FAST government appointed Palusalue to serve as Samoa's consul-general in Auckland, New Zealand.

Legislative Assembly of Samoa
Preceded by Tuiloma Pule Lameko	Member of Parliament for Safata; 1996–2016; Served alongside: Leotasu'atele Manusegi, Suatele Manusegi Leota, Tuia Pua Fuatogi Letoa, Manu'alesagalala Enokati Posala	Constituency redrawn
Party political offices
New office	Deputy Leader of the Tautua Samoa Party; 2010–2011	Succeeded by A'eau Peniamina
Preceded by Va'ai Papu Vailupe	Leader of the Tautua Samoa Party; 2011–2016	Vacant
Political offices
Preceded by Va'ai Papu Vailupe	Leader of the Opposition; 2011–2016	Vacant Title next held by Tuilaʻepa Saʻilele Malielegaoi
