= 1991 Western Samoan general election =

- 5 April 1991

All 47 seats in the Legislative Assembly 24 seats needed for a majority
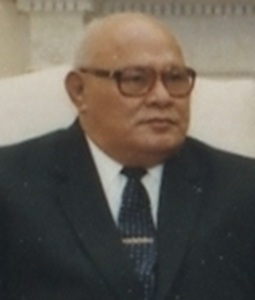

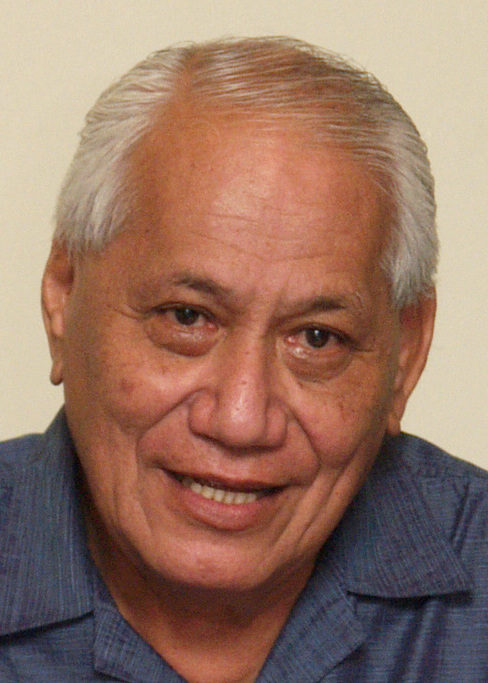
	First party	Second party
Leader	Tofilau Eti Alesana	Tupua Tamasese Efi
Party	HRPP	SNDP
Last election	35.87%, 23 seats	–
Seats won	27	15
Seat change	▲4	New
Popular vote	29,768	12,756
Percentage	49.58%	21.25%
Swing	▲13.71pp	New
Prime Minister before election
Tofilau Eti Alesana
HRPP
Subsequent Prime Minister
Tofilau Eti Alesana
HRPP

General elections were held in Western Samoa on 5 April 1991, to determine the composition of the 11th Parliament. The elections were the first since the introduction of universal suffrage following a referendum held the previous year. However, candidates were still required to be Matai. The two main parties were the governing Human Rights Protection Party (HRPP), led by Prime Minister Tofilau Eti Alesana and the opposition Samoan National Development Party (SNDP), led by former Prime Minister Tupua Tamasese Efi.

Convinced it would remain in government, the HRPP campaigned on its accomplishments and promised to continue its numerous infrastructure projects, while the SNDP's campaign focused primarily on combating corruption. The elections were the first in which the government required voters to use an identification card to prevent fraud, as witnessed in previous elections. The HRPP retained power, winning 27 seats to the SNDP's 15, while independents won the remaining five. Efi lost his seat, although he won back in a subsequent by-election after filing a successful electoral petition. Two independents and one SNDP defector joined the HRPP after the election, increasing its seat count to 30.

== Background ==
At the 1988 general election, the coalition that had governed since 1985 consisting of former Prime Minister Tupua Tamasese Efi's Christian Democratic Party and a bloc of independent former HRPP members led by Prime Minister Vaʻai Kolone, won a narrow majority of 24 seats. Meanwhile, the HRPP secured 23 seats. However, on the day of the vote for prime minister, one coalition member crossed the floor, resulting in the HRPP's return to power and its leader, Tofilau Eti Alesana, became prime minister for a second time. After the election, the coalition merged to form the Samoan National Development Party, with Efi as leader and Kolone as deputy.

In 1990, a constitutional referendum occurred, where enrolled voters decided on two proposals. The first was an amendment to introduce universal suffrage, extending voting rights to all citizens aged 21 and older. However, candidates in the general constituencies would still require a Matai title to run. Beforehand, eligible voters had to hold a Matai title, except for those enrolled in the individual voters' constituency. The second was a proposition to establish an upper house of parliament consisting of members elected from the eleven traditional political districts. The HRPP supported universal suffrage, as with a smaller electorate, candidates could sway the election in their favour with relative ease via bribery and treating. The party, therefore, argued a larger electorate would curb the effects of corrupt electoral practices. Universal suffrage passed with 52% of the vote; however, voters overwhelmingly rejected the proposal for an upper house, with 60% having voted against it.

== Electoral system ==
At the 1991 general election, parliament was composed of 47 members, serving a term of up to three years. Of the 42 constituencies, 37 elected a single member, while four of the larger constituencies elected two representatives and were entitled to cast two ballots. Two members represented the nationwide individual voters constituency and were elected by voters with either partial Samoan ancestry or those who were not ethnic Samoans. The country used the first-past-the-post voting system to elect all candidates. Eligible candidates were required to hold a Matai title (except for contestants of the individual voters' seats), be a citizen of Western Samoa and be an enrolled voter. Contestants must also have resided in the country for at least 12 months before the election. Ineligible individuals included those convicted of a crime in Western Samoa and American Samoa and sentenced to at least two years or the death penalty. Civil servants were required to resign to contest the election.

=== Voters ===
Due to the passage of Universal Suffrage in the 1990 referendum, the 1991 general election was the first since Western Samoa's independence in which all non-Matai aged 21 and older had the right to vote. Voters could elect to enrol in a constituency rather than the one where they reside by right of significant family ties or matai titles. Individuals who wished to vote outside their constituencies on election day were entitled to cast a special vote. Due to an amendment to the electoral act in 1990, this election was the first in which the government issued voter identification cards in an attempt to prevent voter fraud. In previous elections, there were reports of individuals voting on behalf of voters who were overseas or deceased. The electoral commission established registration centres for ID certificates in all constituencies and Western Samoa's diplomatic missions in New Zealand, the high commission in Wellington and the consulate in Auckland. During the registration period, which concluded on 16 March, the electoral commission rejected a considerable number of voting applications due to many having false details. Some Matai who participated in previous elections were found not to have Western Samoan citizenship and were, therefore, ineligible.

== Parties and candidates ==
The two major parties that contested the election were the governing Human Rights Protection Party, led by Prime Minister Tofilau Eti Alesana and the main opposition, the Samoan National Development Party, led by Opposition Leader Tupua Tamasese Efi. Of the 160 candidates that contested the election, the HRPP fielded 60, 46 ran under the SNDP banner, and the rest were either independents or affiliated with other parties. Until an amendment to the electoral act in 1995, the Electoral Commission did not require candidates to disclose their party affiliation when registering their candidacies. Only four contestants, all from the HRPP, were women.

Party	Leader	Founded	1988 seats
Human Rights Protection Party	Tofilau Eti Alesana	1979	23 / 47
Samoan National Development Party	Tupua Tamasese Efi	1988	—N/a
Independents	—N/a	—N/a	0 / 47

== Campaign ==
Confident it would win re-election and potentially in a landslide, the governing HRPP highlighted achievements from the previous term, such as a programme providing most villages in the country with electricity access, Universal Suffrage, the establishment of the ombudsman's office and that of the National University of Samoa. The HRPP's manifesto included an expansion of infrastructure projects, such as improved access to water, an upgrade of the country's roads by the conclusion of 1994, and continuing the rural electricity programme. The party pledged to maintain a bonus scheme for farmers. On conservation, the party planned to organise the planting of trees along rivers and sought cooperation from villages.

A significant campaign focus for the opposition SNDP was eradicating corruption, which they accused the HRPP government of engaging in. The party vowed that if they were to oust the HRPP, they would establish an anti-corruption tribunal. The SNDP also promised to terminate the education minister's ex officio membership in the National University of Samoa council and to bar all politicians from holding membership. In an effort to appeal to elderly voters, the SNDP announced plans to lower the eligible pension age from 65 to 55.

== Conduct ==
The dissolution of the 10th Parliament occurred on 19 February 1991, approximately six days before the three-year parliamentary term was due to expire. A four-week ban on candidates presenting gifts such as food, beverages and money, a cultural practice required in Samoan hospitality, was in place until election day to prevent candidates from illegally pressuring electors to vote for them. Reports surfaced of some voters allegedly attempting to sell their votes to contestants in exchange for financial assistance with living costs. On election day, voting commenced at 9:00. It concluded at 15:00 local time (UTC−11:00), and the release of preliminary results began at 18:00. The counting of the preliminary results was complete by midnight.

== Results ==
In the preliminary count, the HRPP led with a 26-seat majority, the SNDP with 18 and independents led in the remaining three. Following the tally of special votes and subsequent recounts, the electoral commission released the official results on 22 April. In the final results, the HRPP government increased its majority to 27, confirming its re-election. The SNDP's share fell to 15 and five independents won seats. Only two of the four female candidates were successful. SNDP Leader Efi and Parliamentary Speaker Aʻeau Peniamina lost their seats; the SNDP leader attributed his defeat to having neglected his constituency while assisting the campaigns of fellow SNDP contestants. Two candidates, including former Prime Minister Vaʻai Kolone, were elected unopposed.

Party	Votes	%	Seats	+/–
Human Rights Protection Party	29,768	49.58	27	+4
Samoan National Development Party	12,756	21.25	15	New
Other parties	13,729	22.87	0	–
Independents	3,783	6.30	5	+5
Total	60,036	100.00	47	0
Valid votes	60,036	99.62		
Invalid/blank votes	229	0.38		
Total ballots cast		–		
Registered voters/turnout	59,299	–		
Source: Nohlen et al.

== Aftermath ==
Although universal suffrage was supposed to guarantee individuals' right to vote as they wished, following the election, several village councils penalised voters accused of having not voted for candidates endorsed by these councils. In one case, a family in the constituency of Lefaga and Faleseʻela were banished from their village of Savaia after being transported by and then voting for an SNDP candidate. The Savaia Village Council determined before the election that all electors in the village were to vote for an HRPP candidate they backed. Meanwhile, in the SNDP leader's constituency of Anoamaʻa East, the village of Lufilufi expelled a villager who was a prominent campaigner for Moananu Salale, a rival candidate of Efi.

Two independent MPs joined the HRPP shortly after the election, while one successful SNDP candidate defected to the governing party. When the 11th Parliament first convened on 7 May, the HRPP occupied 30 seats. With an enlarged majority, the HRPP sought to convince at least two other MPs to join to provide the party with a two-thirds majority, enabling the party to enact constitutional changes, such as adding an extra seat to the constituencies of Safata and Salega to cater to the large population growth in these areas. The prime minister reappointed only two former ministers to the new cabinet. Fiamē Naomi Mataʻafa, daughter of the country's first Prime Minister Fiamē Mataʻafa Faumuina Mulinuʻu II, became the first female cabinet minister in the nation's history.

After the election, some unsuccessful candidates filed electoral petitions against their victorious opponents, alleging bribery, treating and other illegal practices. At the 1 May deadline, there were eleven electoral petitions, seven against HRPP members, including three cabinet ministers, while four were against members of the SNDP. All petitions, except for one, were either withdrawn or dismissed by the Supreme Court. Efi's petition was the only successful one; he returned to parliament after winning a subsequent by-election.

== See also ==
- List of members of the Legislative Assembly of Western Samoa (1991–1996)
