= Toluono Feti =

Samoan politician

Toluono Feti Toluono is a Samoan politician and member of the Legislative Assembly of Samoa. He was a founding member of the Tautua Samoa Party.

In January 2011 Toluono was prosecuted on charges of theft and fraud relating to an unlawful land transfer.
