= Namulauʻulu Vavae Tuilagi =

Samoan politician

Namulauʻulu Vavae Tuilagi (born 1948) is a Samoan politician and former member of the Legislative Assembly of Samoa. He served as Deputy Speaker of the Legislative Assembly in the early 1990s.

On 22 October 2010 Namulau’ulu admitted a charge of attempted rape.
