= Samoa National Democratic Party =

Samoan political party

- Abbreviation: SNDP
- Leader: Valasi Toogamaga Tafito
- Founded: 11 September 2019
- Ideology: Anti-Land and Titles Bill
- Legislative Assembly: 4 / 53

The Samoa National Democratic Party is a political party in Samoa. Its leader is Valasi Toogamaga Tafito.

The party was registered in late 2019 and claims to be a recreation of the old Samoan National Development Party, which was Samoa's main opposition between 1988 and 2003. Its major policy issues are customary land rights, unemployment, and the enfranchisement of overseas Samoans.

The party aimed to contest the 2021 Samoan general election. In May 2020 it announced that it had recruited 17 candidates.

On 2 September 2020 the party announced it would join forces with the Faʻatuatua i le Atua Samoa ua Tasi and Tumua ma Puleono parties to contest the 2021 election. SNDP and Tumua ma Puleono candidates will run under the FAST banner, with only one candidate in each constituency. In the general election, four SNDP-affiliated candidates won seats.

The party contested the 2025 general election.
