= Christian Party (Samoa) =

The Christian Party was a small political party in Samoa. The party, also known as the Samoan Christian Party, was led by Tuala Falenaoti Tiresa Malietoa. The party was dominated by women. It contested the 2006 Samoan general election but did not win any seats. It did not contest the 2011 election.

The party was deregistered in February 2020 after not paying its registration fee.
