= Samoan Conservative Progressive Party =

Former political party in Samoa

The Samoan Conservative Progressive Party (SCPP) was a political party in Samoa. The party was established in June 1995 by Leota Itu'au Ale, former deputy leader of the Samoan National Development Party after a disagreement over the party's leadership. The SCPP supported the incumbent Human Rights Protection Party government.
