= Western Samoa Labour Party =

The Western Samoa Labour Party (WSLP) was a political party in Samoa. It was founded on June 4, 1993, by To'alepai Toesulusulu Si'ueva, a former Minister of Health in the 1985–88 coalition government. The party opposed the HRPP and the 1991 constitutional amendment which saw the term of the Fono extended from three to five years.
