= 1990 Western Samoan constitutional referendum =

12 November 1990

Do you agree that every citizen of Western Samoa who has attained the age of 21 years is entitled to be registered to vote at any General Election or By-Election?
For	52.62%
Against	47.38%

Do you agree that there should be a second Assembly for Parliament to be called the Maota o le Aganuu comprising members from each of the eleven traditional divisions of Western Samoa, such members to be elected in accordance with custom and tradition?
For	39.32%
Against	60.68%

A constitutional referendum was held in Western Samoa on 12 November 1990. Voters were asked whether they approved of the introduction of universal suffrage and a second chamber of Parliament. The first change was approved by 52.6% of voters, but the second opposed by 60.7%. Voter turnout was 74.3% for the first question and 73.7% for the second.

Although universal suffrage was introduced, candidates in elections still had to be part of the Matai.

== Results ==
=== Question One: Universal Suffrage ===
Choice	Votes	%
For	20,149	52.6
Against	18,141	47.4
Invalid/blank votes	1,844	–
Total	40,143	100
Registered voters/turnout	54,002	74.32
Source: Nohlen et al.

=== Question Two: Second chamber of Parliament ===
Choice	Votes	%
For	14,355	39.3
Against	22,119	60.7
Invalid/blank votes	3,331	–
Total	39,785	100
Registered voters/turnout	54,002	73.67
Source: Nohlen et al.
