= Samoan United Independents Political Party =

The Samoan United Independents Political Party (SUIPP) was a political party in Samoa. The party was formed in the wake of the 2001 election, when 12 independent MPs grouped together. The party later combined with the Samoan National Development Party to form the Samoan Democratic United Party.

The party was led by Asiata Sale'imoa Va'ai.
