= People's Party (Samoa) =

Political party in Samoa

The People's Party (TPP) was a Samoan political party. It was founded in July 2008 by campaigners from People Against Switching Sides, protesting against legislation aimed at changing the side of the road driven on (from right to left). The party's chairman is Tole’afoa Solomona To’ailoa, who has stated that he does not intend to be the party's leader. According to To'ailoa, the party "will not be focusing on the road change only but [...] will be focusing on all the other issues which are affecting the lives of our people right now."

The party was deregistered in February 2020 after not paying its registration fee.
