= Samoa Liberal Party =

The Samoa Liberal Party was a political party in Samoa. It was founded in June 1993 by three MPs expelled from the Human Rights Protection Party for crossing the floor and voting against part of the government's budget. The party's first leader was Nonumalo Leulumoega Sofara.

The party won one seat at the 1996 Western Samoan general election.
