= Falese'ela =

Coordinates: 13.936°S 171.97°W

Falease'elā is a village on the Southwest coast of Upolu island in Samoa. the village is part of Lefaga ma Faleaseela Electoral Constituency (Faipule District) which forms part of the larger A'ana political district.

Falease'ela is part of the larger village of Lefaga which includes a number of sub-villages.

The population of Falease'ela is 1051.

The highest ranking chief in Falease'ela Lefaga (A'ana) is Vaafusuaga Sa'o Maugā A'ana Uatasi II who is the current paramount chief.

The village or Nu'u, has its iconic "Liua le Vai O Sina River" running through the heart of the village for generations now. Further up the river is the Lalotalie River Retreat where access to guided river and waterfall hikes are available.
