= Samoa All People's Party =

The Samoa All People's Party (SAPP) was a political party in Samoa. It was formed on 24 March 1996, by former Human Rights Protection Party MP Matatumua Maimoaga, who became Samoa's first female political party leader. The party was notable for its internal equality, allowing people as young as 16 and of both genders to hold internal party positions.
