= Tautua Samoa Party =

Samoan political party

Tautua Samoa Party Vaega Faʻaupufai le Tautua Sāmoa
- Abbreviation: TSP
- Leader: Vacant
- President: Afualo Wood Salele
- Founder: Lealailepule Rimoni Aiafi
- Founded: 17 December 2008
- Newspaper: Tautua Lelei
- Ideology: Agrarianism; Christian democracy Christian left
- Political position: Centre to centre-left
- Colours: Green
- Slogan: "Work Honestly" (Samoan: "Galue Faʻamaoni")

Website
- tautuasamoaparty.com

The Tautua Samoa Party (Samoan: Vaega Faʻaupufai le Tautua Sāmoa) was a political party in Samoa. The party's policies include economic development, particularly in the agricultural sector, public service reform, a limit on the number of Associate Ministers, and a reduction in the term of Parliament from 5 to 3 or 4 years. Its president was Afualo Wood Salele.

The party was deregistered on 7 March 2023 after failing to pay the annual registration fee.

== Formation ==
The party was formed by 11 independent Members of Parliament in December 2008. The party's founders described their aim as providing parliamentary opposition to the ruling Human Rights Protection Party.

Under the Samoan Electoral Act, registering as members of a new party would have required Tautua Samoa's members to contest a by-election for their parliamentary seats. To avoid this, the party was initially registered under the Companies Act, and its members remained listed as independents. However, as such it was not an officially recognized party by the Parliament of Samoa. Samoa at times has had no official opposition parties, because of restrictive Parliamentary rules that control and constrain the formation of opposition parties.

The party launched with no formal leader; its interim chair was Lealailepule Rimoni Aiafi. In January 2009, the Speaker of Parliament ordered Tautua Samoa to provide formal notice of its existence and membership. The party formally identified itself, and nine Members of Parliament identified themselves as members. In May, Speaker Tolofuaivalelei Falemoe Lei'ataua revoked the parliamentary membership of all nine of the party's MPs, on the grounds that joining a party after being elected breached the provisions of the Electoral Act and the parliament standing orders. Their expulsion from Parliament would prompt by-elections. Lealailepule Rimoni Aiafi stated that he would seek an interim injunction against the Speaker's ruling. The Supreme Court of Samoa cancelled the by-elections and reinstated the MPs, stating that the speaker's position was wrong and the party formation was legal.

In March 2010, the Electoral Act was amended, forbidding any Member of Parliament from leaving their initial party while retaining their seat. Consequently, three members of the Tautua Samoa Party resigned from Parliament: party chairman Lealailepule Rimoni Aiafi, and former HRPP cabinet ministers Palusalue Fa’apo II and Va'ai Papu Vailupe. Their resignation led to by-elections in their constituencies: Vaisigano number one, Faleata West, and Safata territorial. Only those three Members of Parliament resigned, because only they declared they were members of the party following its formal registration. Other MPs who had initially aligned themselves with the party are therefore not officially members.

On 2 May 2010 Va'ai Papu Vailupe was elected unopposed in the Vaisigano by-election, becoming the first MP elected for the party.

== 2011 election ==
In September 2010 the party announced that it had made an agreement with the Samoa Party and is negotiating with the People's Party for the latter to run their candidates under the Tautua banner. Shortly thereafter, the leader of the Samoa Party, Feo Nemaia Esau, announced that his party had disbanded and merged into the Tautua Samoa Party. He explained that the merger would form a more "united opposition" to the ruling Human Rights Protection Party.

Also in September 2010, founding member Mulipola Oliva asked to run as an HRPP candidate.

In November, the party announced that it had reached an agreement with the United Samoa People's Party and several independent politicians to form an organisation, Tumua'i Tutusa, to campaign together for the election. The new group's chairman, Afualo Dr. Wood Salele, stated that the organisation would seek divine intervention, notably through a week of fasting and praying, to defeat the Human Rights Protection Party in the upcoming election. In December, party president Papalii Tavita Moala resigned unexpectedly, and Afualo Wood Salele was chosen for the presidency in his place. On 22 December 2010 Va'ai Papu Vailupe was formally chosen as party leader, with Palusalue Fa’apo II as their deputy.

In January 2011 the party announced a list of 47 candidates to contest the election. In February 2011 at least three Tautua candidates were prevented from standing after village mayors refused to sign their nomination forms. On 14 February the party elected Va'aelua Eti Alesana as its new president.

At the election the party won 13 of 49 seats. Following the election party leader Va'ai Papu Vailupe was found guilty of bribery and treating and deprived of his seat. He contested the subsequent 2011 Vaisigano No. 1 by-election, but was unsuccessful. Vailupe was subsequently convicted of bribery and fined $2,500. In the interim, Palusalue Fa’apo II was confirmed as party leader, with A'eau Peniamina Leavaise'eta as his deputy.

Party president Va'aelua Eti Alesana died on 4 October 2011. On 11 November, Leatinu’u Salote Lesa became the party's president, and the first woman to hold that position.

In October 2015 the party began publishing its own newspaper, Tautua Lelei.

=== Initial MPs ===
- Lealailepule Rimoni Aiafi
- Palusalue Fa’apo II
- A'eau Peniamina
- Levaopolo Talatonu Va’ai
- Fuimaono Naoia Tei
- Mulipola Oliva
- Va'ai Papu Vailupe
- Motuopuaa Uifagasa Aisoli
- Toluono Feti

== 2016 election ==
In the leadup to the 2016 election, Tautua MP Levaopolo Talatonu Va’ai announced that he planned to quit the party and establish a new opposition party. The party's chief whip, Lealailepule Rimoni Aiafi, subsequently defected to the HRPP.

On 4 January 2016 Tautua announced its key election policies of free medical care for under-5-year-olds, increased pension funding, and a ban on work on Sundays. The party ran only 25 candidates, and several were subsequently declared ineligible. The party won only two seats, with the Tautua Samoa caucus members consisting of deputy leader A'eau Peniamina and first term MP Ili Setefano Taʻateo. This prevented Tautua Samoa from obtaining the eight seats required for recognition as a parliamentary party. Which left the party with no official status and also left Samoa without an official opposition. Party leader Palusalue Faʻapo II was among those to lose their seat in this election.

=== Aftermath ===
Following the election, Palusalue congratulated Tuila'epa and the HRPP on their landslide victory. He then blamed the Tautua Samoa Party’s overwhelming defeat on vote-buying. Former shadow minister of finance Afualo Wood Salele weighed in on this sentiment, claiming that candidates had offered voters bags of rice, chicken legs and money.

Levaopolo announced that he would rejoin the party, increasing Tautua Samoa’s seat count to three. He subsequently began to call for the HRPP leadership to consider lowering the seat quota for parties to attain recognition in parliament. Members of the ruling party echoed this request. Prime minister Tuila'epa then instructed 19 HRPP caucus members who were not selected to be associate ministers to perform the role of the opposition along with the Tautua Samoa MPs.

The party did not select a replacement following the defeat of party leader Palusalue. Deputy leader A'eau Peniamina was unable to confirm when the election of a new leader would occur.

In April 2020 Ili Setefano Ta’ateo, one of the party's two MP's, revealed that he was facing pressure from his constituents to switch his support to the HRPP.

== 2021 election ==
The party nominated 14 candidates for the 2021 election. On 11 December 2020 the party announced an electoral alliance with the Samoa First Party and Sovereign Independent Samoa Party, under which the parties will support each other's candidates in seats where they are not running against one another. On 29 January 2021 the alliance launched its manifesto. The party also revealed that it had begun talks with the F.A.S.T. party and Samoa National Democratic Party (who are already in a formal alliance) to form a "grand coalition" to oust the government.

=== Election and aftermath ===
During the 2021 election, Tautua Samoa failed to win any seats in the legislative assembly. Initially it appeared that the party would retain one seat, with Tautua Samoa Party candidate Tamaleta Taimang Jensen leading in the Vaimauga No. 2 constituency. However, an accounting error was detected, which had incorrectly displayed Jensen leading ahead of the HRPP candidate. Thus leaving the party with no seats. The party supported prime minister Tuila'epa Sa'ilele Malielegaoi’s proposal for a second election, as a means of breaking the parliamentary deadlock that had formed between FAST and the HRPP. Tautua Samoa began to campaign for the second poll, however the Supreme Court ruled that the proclamation by the O le Ao o le Malo (head of state) for a second election was unlawful.

Party President Afualo Wood Salele unsuccessfully attempted to challenge the results of the electorate he contested of Salega No. 1, via an electoral petition. Subsequently through another electoral petition, the supreme court found him guilty of three counts of bribery.

== 2021 by-elections ==
On 23 August, the party met to re-strategise for upcoming by-elections. Afualo Wood Salele later announced that the party would be endorsing three candidates one from Tautua Samoa and two independents to contest the by-elections. Tautua Samoa’s sole candidate Su’a Samuelu Su’a withdrew his nomination to contest the Aleipata Itupa i Lalo electorate on 12 November. Both of the Tautua Samoa endorsed candidates were unsuccessful.

== Electoral history ==
=== Legislative Assembly ===
Election	Leader	Votes	%	Seats	+/–	Rank	Status
2011	Vaʻai Papu Vailupe	21,692	24.7	13 / 49	New	2nd	Official opposition
2016	Palusalue Faʻapo II	6,743	8.4	2 / 50	▼11	2nd	No status
2021	Vacant	2,900	3.2	0 / 51	▼2	▼3rd	Extra-parliamentary
