= Samoan National Development Party =

- Leader: Tupua Tamasese Efi (1988-2001); Le Mamea Ropati (2001-2003)
- Founder: Tupua Tamasese Efi
- Founded: 8 April 1988
- Dissolved: 2003; 23 years ago
- Merger of: Christian Democratic Party; Samoa National Party
- Succeeded by: Samoan Democratic United Party
- Colours: Tara

The Samoan National Development Party (SNDP) was a political party in Samoa, and the country's main opposition party between 1988 and 2003. It was led by Tupua Tamasese Efi.

== History ==
In December 1985 Vaʻai Kolone became prime minister following a confidence vote after forming a coalition with the Christian Democratic Party led by Tupua Tamasese Efi. The coalition won an apparent majority in the 1988 Western Samoan general election, but was defeated after an independent changed sides.

On 8 April 1988 the coalition formalised itself as the Samoan National Development Party with Efi as leader and Kolone as deputy. The party included the former Samoa National Party, led by Leota Leuluaiali'i Ituau Ale.

The party opposed the introduction of universal suffrage in 1990-91.

At the 1991 election the party ran on a platform of reduced pension ages and anti-corruption. The party won 17 of 47 seats, but party leader Tupua Tamasese Efi lost his seat. Efi attributed his defeat to having neglected his constituency while assisting the campaigns of fellow SNDP contestants. He subsequently regained his seat after a by-election.

The party won 13 seats at the 1996 election. At the 2001 election the party won 23.5% of popular votes and 13 out of 49 seats. Tui Ātua Tupua Tamasese Efi resigned shortly after the party's loss and was succeeded by Le Mamea Ropati.

In 2003 the party merged with the Samoan United Independents Political Party to form the Samoan Democratic United Party, which replaced it as the main opposition party of Samoa. At the time of the merger, the party was led by Le Mamea Ropati.

== Electoral performance ==
| Election | Leader | Votes | % | Seats | +/– | Position | Status |
|---|---|---|---|---|---|---|---|
| 1991 | Tupua Tamasese Efi | 12,756 | 21.25% | 15 / 47 | ▲15 | ▲2nd | Opposition |
| 1996 | Tupua Tamasese Efi | 17,586 | 26.09% | 11 / 49 | ▼4 | 2nd | Opposition |
| 2001 | Tupua Tamasese Efi | 17,966 | 23.50% | 13 / 49 | ▲2 | 2nd | Opposition |
