= Samoan Democratic United Party =

The Samoan Democratic United Party (SDUP) was the main opposition party of Samoa from 2003 to 2008. The SDUP was formed in 2003 from the Samoan National Development Party (SNDP) and the Samoan United Independents Political Party (SUIPP). During the 2006 Samoan general election, they won 10 of the 49 seats, but one member lost his seat after an election petition ruling in August 2006.

At the end of August 2006, the party announced it had a new leader, Asiata Sale'imoa Va'ai. The long-standing former leader, Le Mamea Ropati, had disputed the change of leadership. Following the departure of Ropati and his deputy Sililoto Tolo Tuaifaiva, the party dropped to seven MPs, and ceased to be recognised in the House. As a result, all its members were considered to be independents. Court action challenging the Speaker's ruling was repeatedly delayed. In the interim, the party's deputy leader, Aeau Peniamina Le'avai, resigned, while another MP, Sililoto Tolo Tua'ifaiva, died. In August 2007 party leader Asiata Sale'imoa Va'ai was charged with contempt of court after accusing the judiciary of bias over delays in the court case.

In April 2008 most remaining SDUP MPs agreed to form a new party, which eventually became the Tautua Samoa Party.

In September 2010, the leaders of the SDUP, including Le Mamea Ropati, Tuia Paepae Letoa and Mulipola Oliva asked to run as HRPP candidates.

The party was finally deregistered in February 2020 after not paying its registration fee.

== People ==
=== Leaders ===
- Le Mamea Ropati (?–2006)
- Asiata Sale'imoa Va'ai (2006–2010)
