= List of members of the Legislative Assembly of Samoa (2021–2025) =

Legislative Members of Samoa

Members of the Legislative Assembly of Samoa were elected on 9 April 2021. According to preliminary results, the 51 members consisted of 25 representatives of Fa'atuatua i le Atua Samoa ua Tasi (FAST), 25 from the Human Rights Protection Party (HRPP), one from the Tautua Samoa Party and one independent. Official results were declared on 16 April, resulting in some change to individual winners, but no change to the overall balance of power. Election petitions subsequently saw four HRPP MPs unseated, and three more resign as part of settlements.

== Members ==
Name	Electorate	Party
Lealailepule Rimoni Aiafi	Faleata No. 3	Human Rights Protection Party
Hon Fiame Naomi Mata'afa	Lotofaga	Fa'atuatua i le Atua Samoa ua Tasi
Tuila'epa Sa'ilele Malielegaoi	Lepa	Human Rights Protection Party
Matamua Vasati Pulufana	Faasaleleaga No. 1	Fa'atuatua i le Atua Samoa ua Tasi
Faimalotoa Kika Stowers	Gagaifomauga No. 1	Human Rights Protection Party
Leota Tima Leavai	Falealupo	Human Rights Protection Party
Tea Tooala Peato	Faasaleleaga No. 4	Fa'atuatua i le Atua Samoa ua Tasi
Faualo Harry Schuster	Vaimauga No. 4	Fa'atuatua i le Atua Samoa ua Tasi
Manuleleua Paletasala Tovale	Faleata No. 1	Fa'atuatua i le Atua Samoa ua Tasi
Leatinuu Wayne So'oialo	Faleata No. 2	Fa'atuatua i le Atua Samoa ua Tasi
Fesolai Apulu Tuigamala	Aana Alofi No. 1	Fa'atuatua i le Atua Samoa ua Tasi
Agaseata Valelio Tanuvasa	Aana Alofi No. 3	Fa'atuatua i le Atua Samoa ua Tasi
Toeolesulusulu Cedric Schuster	Aana Alofi No. 4	Fa'atuatua i le Atua Samoa ua Tasi
Auapaau Mulipola Aloitafua	Aiga i le Tai	Fa'atuatua i le Atua Samoa ua Tasi
Masinalupe Makesi Masinalupe	Lefaga and Faleaseela	Fa'atuatua i le Atua Samoa ua Tasi
Toelupe Poumulinuku Onesemo	Falealili No. 1	Fa'atuatua i le Atua Samoa ua Tasi
Magele Sekati Fiaui	Faasaleleaga No. 2	Fa'atuatua i le Atua Samoa ua Tasi
Papali’i Li’o Taeu Masipau	Faasaleleaga No. 3	Fa'atuatua i le Atua Samoa ua Tasi
Seuamuli Fasi Toma	Gagaemauga No. 2	Fa'atuatua i le Atua Samoa ua Tasi
Vaele Paiaaua Iona Sekuini	Gagaifomauga No. 2	Fa'atuatua i le Atua Samoa ua Tasi
Hon Laauli Leuatea Polataivao	Gagaifomauga No. 3	Fa'atuatua i le Atua Samoa ua Tasi
Niuava Eti Malolo	Vaisigano No. 1	Fa'atuatua i le Atua Samoa ua Tasi
Valasi Toogamaga Tafito	Vaisigano No. 2	Fa'atuatua i le Atua Samoa ua Tasi
Seuula Ioane	Alataua Sisifo (West)	Fa'atuatua i le Atua Samoa ua Tasi
Fepuleai Faasavalu Faimata Sua	Salega West	Fa'atuatua i le Atua Samoa ua Tasi
Lenatai Victor Tamapua	Vaimauga No. 2	Human Rights Protection Party
Olo Fiti Vaai	Salega No. 2	Fa'atuatua i le Atua Samoa ua Tasi
Mulipola Anarosa Ale Molioo	Palauli No. 1	Fa'atuatua i le Atua Samoa ua Tasi
Leota Laki Lamositele	Palauli No. 2	Fa'atuatua i le Atua Samoa ua Tasi
Lagaaia Tiatuau Tufuga	Palauli No. 3	Fa'atuatua i le Atua Samoa ua Tasi
Tuala Iosefo Ponifasio	Gagaemauga No. 1	Fa'atuatua i le Atua Samoa ua Tasi (elected as an independent)
Sulamanaia Tauiliili Tuivasa	Vaimauga No. 1	Human Rights Protection Party
Hon Niko Lee Hang	Vaimauga No. 3	Human Rights Protection Party
Ale Vena Ale	Faleata No. 4	Human Rights Protection Party
Keneti Sio	Sagaga No. 1	Human Rights Protection Party
Seiuli Ueligitone Seiuli	Sagaga No. 2	Human Rights Protection Party
Sala Fata Pinati	Sagaga No. 3	Human Rights Protection Party
Tuisa Tasi Patea	Sagaga No. 4	Human Rights Protection Party
Aiono Afaese Toleafoa	Aana Alofi No. 2	Human Rights Protection Party
Lupematasila Tologata Tile Leia	Falelatai and Samatau	Human Rights Protection Party
Leaana Ronnie Posini	Safata No. 1	Human Rights Protection Party
Nonu Lose Niumata	Safata No. 2	Human Rights Protection Party
Tuu'u Anasi'i Leota	Siumu	Human Rights Protection Party
Fuimaono Teo Samuelu	Falealili No. 2	Human Rights Protection Party
Fuaava Suluimalo Amataga	Aleipata Itupa i Luga	Human Rights Protection Party
Fiugalu Eteuati Eteuati	Aleipata Itupa i Lalo	Human Rights Protection Party
Mau'u Siaosi Puepuemai	Vaa o Fonoti	Human Rights Protection Party
Alaiasa Sepulona Moananu	Anoamaa No. 1	Human Rights Protection Party
Hon Fonotoe Nuafesili Pierre Lauofo	Anoamaa No. 2	Human Rights Protection Party
Peseta Vaifou Tevaga	Faasaleleaga No. 5	Human Rights Protection Party
Hon Lautafi Fio Selafi Purcell	Satupaitea	Human Rights Protection Party

== Changes ==
- On 18 June 2021 the election of the HRPP's Seiuli Ueligitone Seiuli was overturned by an election petition, which found him guilty of bribery and treating and banned him from office for 15 years.
- On 29 June 2021 Sagaga No. 4 Tuisa Tasi Patea resigned to avoid an election petition.
- On 5 July Aleipata Itupa i Lalo MP Fiugalu Eteuati Eteuati was convicted of 13 counts of bribery and treating in an electoral petition.
- On 7 July 2021 Safata No. 2 MP Nonu Lose Niumata resigned as part of the settlement of an electoral petition.
- On 9 July 2021 Falealupo MP Leota Tima Leavai resigned and agreed not to run in a by-election as part of an election petition settlement.
- On 16 August 2021 the election of Aana Alofi No.2 MP Aiono Afaese Toleafoa and Falealili No. 2 MP Fuimaono Teo Samuelu were both overturned by election petitions.
- On 22 November 2021 Fuiono Tenina Crichton was declared elected unopposed in Falealupo after his only opponent in the planned by-election was ruled to be ineligible by the Supreme Court.
- On 26 November 2021 the 2021 Samoan by-elections were held, resulting in Aiono Tile Gafa (HRPP) being elected in Aana Alofi No. 2; Titimaea Tafua (FAST) being elected in Aleipata Itupa i Lalo; Maiava Fuimaono Asafo (FAST) being elected in Falealili No. 2; Laumatiamanu Ringo Purcell (FAST) being elected in Safata No. 2; Maulolo Tavita Amosa being elected in Sagaga No. 2; and Tagaloatele Pasi Poloa (FAST) being elected in Sagaga No. 4.
- On 29 November 2021, following the by-elections, the electoral commission declared Ali'imalemanu Alofa Tuuau (HRPP) and Faagasealii Sapoa Feagiai (HRPP) elected as additional members under the women's quota. Their election was disputed by the Speaker, but on 12 May 2022 the Supreme Court confirmed their election, and additionally declared To'omata Norah Leota (FAST) elected as an additional member due to the resignation of Leota Tima Leavai and her subsequent replacement by a man. The Supreme Court noted in its decision that when a man is elected to fill a constituency seat vacancy previously held by a woman, the constitutional requirement for a woman to be elected as an additional member is separate from the quota requirement. Thus there are now a record 7 women parliamentarians.
- On 25 March 2022, the Gaga'ifomauga 2 seat became vacant upon the death of FAST MP Va'ele Pa'ia'aua Iona Sekuini. Fo'isala Lilo Tu'u Ioane was elected in the resulting 2022 Gaga'ifomauga 2 by-election.
- On 3 November Tuuʻu Anasiʻi Leota, Ale Vena Ale, and Mauʻu Siaosi Puʻepuʻemai resigned from the HRPP to become independents. Following a court challenge, their seats were declared vacant on 19 July 2023.
