= Toʻomata Norah Leota =

Samoan politician

To'omata Norah Leota

Member of the Samoa Parliament for Anoama'a No. 2 (Note: elected under the women's quota)
- In office 11 May 2022 – 14 November 2022

Personal details
- Party: Fa'atuatua i le Atua Samoa ua Tasi

To'omata Norah Leota is a Samoan politician and former member of the Legislative Assembly of Samoa. She is a member of the FAST Party.

To'omata is from Solosolo.

To'omata unsuccessfully contested the 2021 Samoan general election as a FAST candidate in the seat of Anoama'a No. 2. Following the election she filed an election petition against the winner, Fonotoe Pierre Lauofo. The petition was unsuccessful, and found that she was guilty of an illegal practice for bribing seven villages with envelopes of cash during a party roadshow. Despite this, she was not disqualified from future elections.

Following the 2021 Samoan by-elections, the electoral commission declared Ali'imalemanu Alofa Tuuau and Faagasealii Sapoa Feagiai elected under the women's quota. To'omata challenged the decision in court, arguing that she had been overlooked. On 11 May 2022 the Supreme Court of Samoa confirmed the election of the two additional members. The court additionally declared To'omata elected as a third additional member due to the resignation of Leota Tima Leavai and her subsequent replacement by a man. The Supreme Court noted in its decision that when a man is elected to fill a constituency seat vacancy previously held by a woman, the constitutional requirement for a woman to also be elected as an additional member is separate from the quota requirement. She was sworn in as an MP on 17 May 2022. Following her swearing-in, the Human Rights Protection Party lodged an appeal against her appointment.

On 6 July 2022 she was sworn in as Associate Minister of Customs and Revenue. On 14 November 2022 the Court of Appeal voided her appointment as an MP.
