= Fuimaono =

Fuimaono is a surname and a given name. Notable people with the name include:

Surname:

- A. U. Fuimaono (1924–2008), American Samoan politician and Paramount Chief
- Lutu T. S. Fuimaono (1930–2004), American Samoa politician and journalist
- Rivalina Fuimaono (born 1997), New Zealand-Samoan footballer
- Soliai Tuipine Fuimaono (born 1938), American Samoan politician
- Taliah Fuimaono (born 1999), Australian rugby league football player
- Tyrell Fuimaono (born 1996), Australian professional rugby league footballer
- Eliota Fuimaono-Sapolu (born 1980), Samoan rugby union footballer

Given name:

- Maiava Fuimaono Asafo, Samoan politician
- Fuimaono Karl Pulotu-Endemann, Samoan-born, New Zealand-based academic, nurse and fa'afafine
- Fuimaono Teo Samuelu, Samoan politician and former member of the Legislative Assembly of Samoa
- Fuimaono Tafua (born 1947), Samoan rugby union prop
- Fuimaono Naoia Tei, Samoan politician and former member of the Legislative Assembly of Samoa
