= Afualo Wood Salele =

Samoan politician

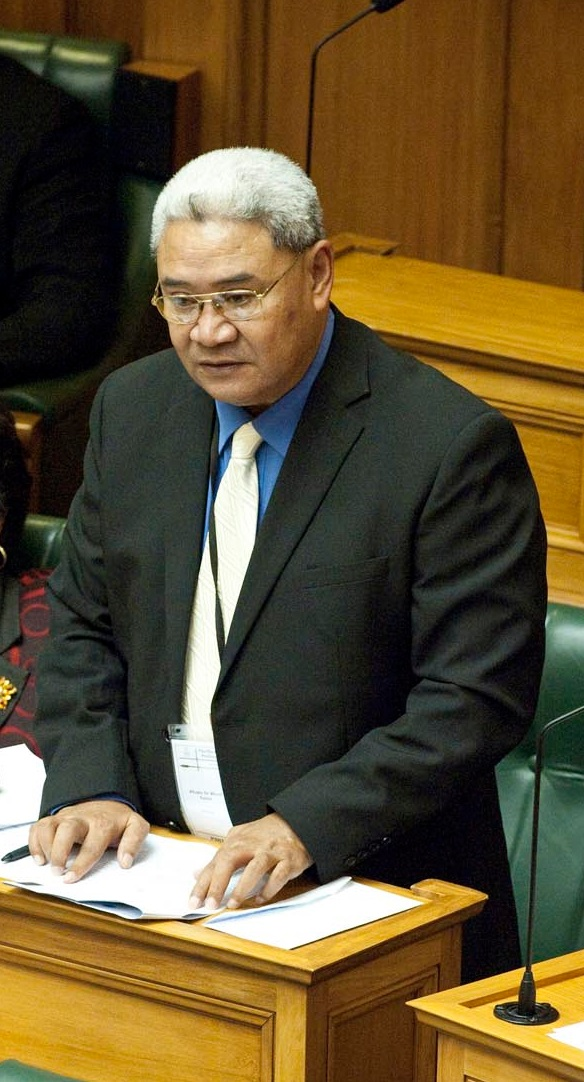
- Afualo Wood Salele in 2013

Member of the Samoan Parliament for Salega West
- In office 4 March 2011 – 4 March 2016
- Preceded by: None (Constituency created)
- Succeeded by: To'omata Aki Tuipea

Personal details
- Born: 6 August 1957 (age 69)
- Party: Tautua Samoa Party
- Spouse: Tuaopepe Rose Marie Keil Salele
- Education: University of Guelph; University of New England, Armidale; University of the South Pacific

Afualo Wood Uti Salele (born 6 August 1957) is a Samoan politician, matai and academic. He is the leader of the Tautua Samoa Party.

Salele is an economist and worked as a lecturer at the National University of Samoa. He served as Tautua's vice-president, but was appointed president in 2010 after the departure of Papalii Tavita Moala. In February 2011 he was replaced as party president by Va'aelua Eti Alesana.

Salele was first elected to the Legislative Assembly of Samoa at the 2011 election. During the 2011–2016 term he served as Tautua's finance spokesperson, during which he called for the creation of an independent anti-corruption body. He lost his seat at the 2016 election. Following his election loss he returned to the National University of Samoa.

In the leadup to the 2021 election he negotiated an electoral alliance with the Samoa First Party and Sovereign Independent Samoa Party, under which the parties will support each other's candidates in seats where they are not running against one another. He contested the Salega No. 1 electorate, but was unsuccessful. A subsequent electoral petition saw Afualo found guilty of three counts of bribery.
