= 2026 Safata 2 by-election =

- 10 July 2026
- Turnout: 81.82%
	First party	Second party	Third party
Candidate	Tuia Fuatogi Puʻa Letoa	Leleua Suataga Aso	Toleafoa Losalia Niumata
Party	FAST	Independent	Independent
Popular vote	891	567	109
Percentage	56.86%	36.18%	6.96%
MP before election
Tuia Fuatogi Puʻa Letoa
HRPP
Elected MP
Tuia Fuatogi Puʻa Letoa
FAST

A by-election to the Legislative Assembly of Samoa was held in the Safata 2 constituency on 10 July 2026. The by-election was triggered after the incumbent representative, Tuia Fuatogi Puʻa Letoa, resigned from the legislature to join the governing Faʻatuatua i le Atua Samoa ua Tasi (FAST) party, after leaving the opposition Human Rights Protection Party (HRPP). Members of parliament in Samoa are required to vacate their seats if they change their affiliations during a parliamentary term, but are eligible to contest the subsequent by-election. Letoa reclaimed the seat with 56% of the vote, defeating independent candidates Leleua Suataga Aso, who received 36%, and Toleafoa Losalia Niumata, who garnered 6%. After the by-election, Aso unsuccessfully challenged the result in court.

== Background ==
During the 2025 snap election, HRPP candidate Tuia Fuatogi Puʻa Letoa narrowly won the constituency. He defeated the incumbent representative, Sports and Recreation Minister Laumatiamanu Ringo Purcell of the Samoa Uniting Party, and two other candidates. FAST won a majority of seats at the snap election and went on to form a government under Prime Minister Laʻauli Leuatea Schmidt. Letoa resigned from parliament on 26 May 2026 to defect from the HRPP to FAST, triggering the by-election. According to the constitution, an MP's parliamentary membership is voided should they change their affiliation during a parliamentary term, and must contest a by-election if they wish to retain their seat. Letoa said he decided to switch parties after he was asked to do so by some of the chiefs in his district.

== Electoral system ==
Elections to all 51 of the directly elected seats in the Legislative Assembly are conducted through the first-past-the-post voting system. Candidates are required to hold a matai title, be at least 21 years old, and have resided in Samoa for a minimum of three years before the nomination date. Individuals convicted of a crime in Samoa or any other country within the previous eight years, and people with a mental illness, were ineligible to stand as candidates. Civil servants were permitted to run as long as they resigned from their positions. Should civil servants fail to do so, the date of filing their candidacy is, by law, deemed to be the point when they relinquish their role.

Universal Suffrage took effect in 1991, permitting all Samoan citizens aged 21 and over the right to vote. Compulsory voting and mandatory voter registration were in place for the by-election. Electors who failed to vote were required to pay 100 tālā, while eligible individuals who did not register on the electoral roll before the deadline were liable to pay a 2000 tālā fine. As Samoa did not employ overseas voting at the time of the by-election, electors enrolled in the Safata 2 constituency were required to be present in the country to vote. Voter registration closed on 18 June. A total of 1,920 individuals were eligible to vote in the by-election.

== Candidates and campaign ==
Candidate nominations commenced and concluded on 19 June, contestants had until 26 June to withdraw if they intended to do so. Three candidates contested the by-election: Letoa from FAST and independent contestants Leleua Suataga Aso and Toleafoa Losalia Niumata.

FAST held a roadshow in the constituency attended by some cabinet ministers to rally support for Letoa. Prime Minister Schmidt delivered a speech remotely from New Zealand, where he was receiving medical treatment.

Despite previous reports stating she was an HRPP candidate, Niumata ultimately ran as an independent and pledged to remain as such if elected. She said this would allow her to put the needs of the constituency "without being pulled by political parties". Niumata drew on her decades of professional experience in healthcare and workplace safety. She stated that she would focus on improving healthcare in the community, especially by implementing policies that prevent the emergence of non-communicable diseases through increased education. Niumata criticised the government's delays in providing compensation to communities in the constituency affected by the Manawanui shipwreck and called for more transparency and accountability from members of parliament. She also called for more women to get involved in local politics and adopt matai titles, noting the male-dominated village councils and parliament.

Aso, a veteran educator, announced his key priority would be strengthening families, stating that this would allow communities in the constituency to prosper and result in the country becoming "stronger". Aso emphasised a need for lawmakers to practice good governance and said they needed to listen to constituents more. While previously a FAST supporter, Aso said the timing of the by-election led him to run as an independent.

== Results ==
Pre-polling occurred on 8 July. On the by-election day, polling stations were open from 9:30 to 16:00. Preliminary results showed Letoa leading with 820 votes, ahead of Aso who had 551, while Niumata had received 106. In the final count, Letoa's vote total increased to 891, allowing him to return to parliament. Aso remained in second place with 567, while Niumata finished third with 109 votes.

Candidate	Party	Votes	%
Tuia Fuatogi Puʻa Letoa	Faʻatuatua i le Atua Samoa ua Tasi	891	56.86
Leleua Suataga Aso	Independent	567	36.18
Toleafoa Losalia Niumata	Independent	109	6.96
Total		1,567	100.00
Valid votes		1,567	99.75
Invalid/blank votes		4	0.25
Total votes		1,571	100.00
Registered voters/turnout		1,920	81.82
Source: OEC

== Aftermath ==
Letoa's victory was certified on 14 July. Aso filed an electoral petition against Letoa on 24 July, accusing him of having spent 6,600 tālā bribing voters during the by-election. Aso called on the court to nullify Letoa's election and instead declare him the winner. Letoa was sworn back into parliament on 18 August and was appointed as an associate minister. On 9 October, the Supreme Court dismissed the petition.
