= Muagututagata Peter Ah Him =

Samoan politician

Member of the Samoa Parliament for Sagaga-Le-Usoga
- In office 31 March 2006 – 21 February 2015
- Preceded by: Taliaoa Pita
- Succeeded by: Seiuli Ueligitone Seiuli
- In office 2000 – 2 March 2001
- Preceded by: Leafa Vitale
- Succeeded by: Maulolo Tavita Amosa

Personal details
- Party: Human Rights Protection Party

Muagututagata Peter Ah Him is a Samoan politician and former member of the Legislative Assembly of Samoa. He represented the constituency of Sagaga-Le-Usoga and was a member of the Human Rights Protection Party. He is the younger brother of Maualaivao Pat Ah Him.

Muagututagata owns a stationery company and has served as president of the Samoa Red Cross. He was first elected to parliament in a by-election in 2000, but lost his seat at the 2001 election. He was re-elected at the 2006 election. While he was elected as an independent, he immediately joined the Human Rights Protection Party, and was subsequently appointed Associate Minister for Communication and Information Technology.

In February 2010, Muagututagata called for a law change to allow the whipping of sex offenders.

Muagututagata was re-elected in the 2011 elections and appointed Associate Minister of Labour.

In August 2010 a dispute within the Samoa Red Cross saw him purportedly removed as president over claims of misappropriation of funds, but he was reinstated later that month. In April 2013 Speaker of the Legislative Assembly Laauli Leuatea Polataivao ordered an investigation into whether he should lose his seat after the Supreme Court found that he had misappropriated Red Cross funds. In January 2014 he was charged with obstructing police and making an illegal U-turn over an attempt to avoid a police breath-test. In April 2014 he was found guilty, but then discharged without conviction.

In July 2014 police issued an arrest warrant for Muagututagata after he failed to appear in court on charges of fraud, false accounting, and theft.

In February 2015 he was convicted on two charges of forgery. He was fined $8500, which was later reduced on appeal. In the intervening period he resigned from parliament, precipitating the 2015 Sagaga-le-Usoga by-election.

In October 2018 Muagututagata was one of a group of chiefs charged with contempt of court for bestowing the Malietoa title in violation of a court order.
