= 2015 Sagaga-le-Usoga by-election =

A by-election was held in the Sagaga-le-Usoga constituency in Samoa on 17 April 2015.

It followed the resignation of MP Muagututagata Peter Ah Him (of the governing Human Rights Protection Party, HRPP), who stepped down prior to being convicted for fraud. With the Opposition Tautua Samoa Party not standing a candidate, the HRPP fielded a choice of four candidates, and was certain to retain the seat.

== Results ==
The results were as follows:

Sagaga-le-Usoga by-election, 2015
Party	Candidate	Votes	%	±%
HRPP	Seiuli Ueligitone Seiuli	735	42.24	n/a
HRPP	Fata Paulo Seuseu	492	28.28	n/a
HRPP	Logo Fetaomi Futialo	392	22.53	n/a
HRPP	Vaotu’ua Maulolo	121	6.95	n/a
HRPP hold		Swing		

== 2011 results ==
2011 Samoan general election in Sagaga-le-Usoga constituency
Party	Candidate	Votes	%	±%
HRPP	Muagututagata Peter Ah Him	844	40.99	+0.5%
TSP	Fata Meafou	684	33.22	
Independent	Maulolo Tavita Amosa	531	25.79	
HRPP gain from Independent		Swing		
