= Lafaitele Patrick Leiataualesa =

Samoan politician

Member of the Samoa Parliament for Alataua West
- In office 31 March 2006 – 4 March 2016
- Preceded by: Tuaiaufai Latu
- Succeeded by: Ali'imalemanu Alofa Tuuau

Personal details
- Party: Human Rights Protection Party

Lafaitele Patrick Leiataualesa (also known as Pat Leota) (born ~1968) is a Samoan politician and former member of the Legislative Assembly of Samoa. He is a member of the Human Rights Protection Party.

Lafaitele worked in New Zealand as a fruit picker. In 1988 he was involved in a fight in the Ōtara shopping centre in which a man was hunted down and killed with a machete. He was convicted of manslaughter for his role in the killing and sentenced to six years imprisonment. He was deported in 1992 after serving four years of his sentence. Despite his deportation, he re-entered New Zealand repeatedly using a new passport and a new name.

Lafaitele was first elected to the Legislative Assembly of Samoa at the 2006 Samoan general election as an independent. After siding with the HRPP he was appointed associate minister of revenue. Shortly after the election, his New Zealand murder conviction was revealed. Lafaitele claimed the killing was in self-defence and that he had been unable to appeal against the conviction due to lack of money. He was re-elected at the 2011 election and appointed associate minister for Police and Prisons. In November 2013 he was suspended from the party and his associate ministerial role after swearing at an official during an ava drinking ceremony. He was reinstated in April 2014.

He lost his seat at the 2016 election. Following the election he filed an election petition against successful candidate Ali'imalemanu Alofa Tuuau, but withdrew it after pressure from his constituency and Prime Minister Tuila'epa Sa'ilele Malielegaoi. He attempted to run in the 2021 election but was declared ineligible as a candidate after the court ruled he had failed to render monotaga (service) to the constituency.
