= Amituanai Fagaivalu Kenrick Samu =

Samoan politician

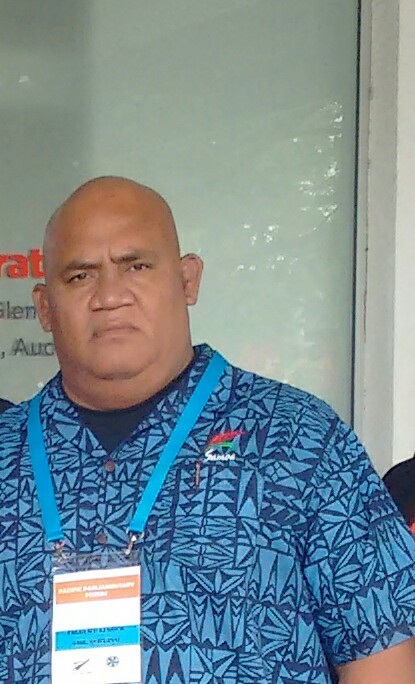
- Amituanai Fagaivalu Kenrick Samu in 2016

Member of the Samoa Parliament for Aleipata Itupa i Luga
- In office 29 July 2011 – 9 April 2021
- Preceded by: Taua Kitiona Seuala
- Succeeded by: Fuaava Suluimalo Amataga

Personal details
- Party: Human Rights Protection Party

Amituanai Fagaivalu Kenrick Samu is a Samoan politician and member of the Legislative Assembly of Samoa. He is a member of the Human Rights Protection Party.

Samu was first elected to the Legislative Assembly in a by-election in 2011. He was re-elected unopposed in the 2016 Samoan general election after his only rival was disqualified. Following the election, he was appointed Associate Minister for Police and Prisons.

In July 2019 he was charged with using offensive language, threatening words and being armed with a dangerous weapon over a land dispute in Lalomanu.

He lost his seat in the 2021 election.
