= 2022 Gagaʻifomauga 2 by-election =

- 3 June 2022
- Turnout: 67.41%
	First party	Second party
Candidate	Foʻisala Lilo Tuʻu Ioane	Soʻoalo Fineaso Poka
Party	Independent	HRPP
Popular vote	441	380
Percentage	32.26%	27.80%
	Third party	Fourth party
Candidate	Falesaopule Vaialia Iosua	Lomia Tauloa Moafanua Siaaga
Party	Independent	FAST
Popular vote	287	259
Percentage	20.99%	18.95%
MP before election
Vaʻele Paʻiaʻaua Iona Sekuini
FAST
Elected MP
Foʻisala Lilo Tuʻu Ioane
Independent

A by-election was held in the Gagaʻifomauga 2 constituency in Samoa on 3 June 2022. It was won by Independent politician Foʻisala Lilo Tuʻu Ioane.

The by-election was triggered by the death of the incumbent member of parliament (MP) Vaʻele Paʻiaʻaua Iona Sekuini of the Faʻatuatua i le Atua Samoa ua Tasi (FAST) party, in March 2022. Originally five members were expected to contest the seat: Two members of the Human Rights Protection Party (HRPP), Soʻoalo Umi Feo Mene, a former associate minister of justice who previously represented the constituency from 2011 to 2021, and Soʻoalo Fineaso Poka. A single member of FAST, Lomia Tauloa Moafanua Siaaga, filed his candidacy. The remaining candidates consist of Independents Falesaopule Vaialia Iosua and Foʻisala Lilo Tuʻu Ioane. On 19 May 2022 Soʻoalo Umi Feo Mene withdrew his candidacy to support Sooalo Fineaso Poka.

== Conduct ==
Pre polling commenced on 1 June. Voting began on 3 June, with a total of roll 2,031 registered voters. Polls closed at 3pm (UTC+13:00), where a preliminary tally commenced. An official count took place the following day.

== Campaign ==
=== Falesaopule Vaialia Iosua ===
Falesaopule Vaialia Iosua, a former public servant who previously served as the assistant chief executive officer of the women's ministry, announced that he intended to address social inequality. Falesaopule, who also served in the ministries of health and education, sports, and culture, has promised to focus on improving access to water, education, and roads, to which he stated he would "fight for the roads in my district to be fixed should I succeed, some of the villages in my constituency have been waiting for years but to no success," On gender equality, he announced that he wants to enhance "economic women empowerment". Falesaopule also intends to increase efforts to decrease youth unemployment, which he said can potentially become disastrous for the constituency due to the relatively easy access these individuals have to alcohol. He said a prime focus would be to help vulnerable families, including individuals with disabilities.

=== Foʻisala Lilo Tuʻu Ioane ===
Foʻisala Lilo Tuʻu Ioane, a farmer, and businessman filed his candidacy for the seat as an independent. He wanted to contest the constituency in the 2021 general election but opted out for personal reasons. Foʻisala said that he filed his candidacy for the by-election due to the encouragement from members of his village of Lefagaoaliʻi and pressure from the village elders. He originally intended to run as a FAST member but opted to run as an independent when the party endorsed FAST contender Lomia Tauloa Moafanua. Foʻisala announced that he would join FAST if victorious. He stated that he is a 'man who makes no promises' and supports the manifesto of FAST. Foʻisala also expressed that he intends to implement policies proposed by FAST and said, "...the late M.P., Vaele had already cut the pieces of the cake for this constituency...so all that's left to do is for someone to step up and distribute it to the constituents".

== Endorsements ==
Lomia Tauloa Moafanua Siaaga (FAST)

Executive officials

- Fiamē Naomi Mataʻafa, Prime Minister of Samoa and Leader of FAST

Organisations

- Faʻatuatua i le Atua Samoa ua Tasi
Soʻoalo Fineaso Poka (HRPP)

Executive officials

- Soʻoalo Umi Feo Mene, former Associate Minister of Justice

== Results ==
Early results indicated an inconclusive race and showed Foʻisala having a slim lead over the HRPP's Soʻoalo. Final results showed Foʻisala winning by over 60 votes.

Candidate	Party	Votes	%
Foʻisala Lilo Tuʻu Ioane	Independent	441	32.26
Soʻoalo Fineaso Poka	Human Rights Protection Party	380	27.80
Falesaopule Vaialia Iosua	Independent	287	20.99
Lomia Tauloa Moafanua Siaaga	Faʻatuatua i le Atua Samoa ua Tasi	259	18.95
Total		1,367	100.00
Valid votes		1,367	99.85
Invalid/blank votes		2	0.15
Total votes		1,369	100.00
Registered voters/turnout		2,031	67.41
Source: Samoa Global News
