= Nonu =

Nonu is a given name and a surname. Notable people with the name include:

- Ma'a Nonu (born 1982), New Zealand rugby union player
- Nonu Lose Niumata, Samoan politician
