= Palamo =

Palamo is a surname. Notable people with the surname include:

- Aveau Niko Palamo, Samoan politician
- Thretton Palamo (born 1988), American rugby union player
