= Salausa John Ah Ching =

Samoan politician

Member of the Samoa Parliament for Faleata Sasae
- In office 4 March 2016 – 9 April 2021
- Preceded by: Aveau Niko Palamo
- Succeeded by: Manuleleua Paletasala Tovale

Personal details
- Party: Human Rights Protection Party

Salausa John Ah Ching is a Samoan politician and former member of the Legislative Assembly of Samoa. He is a member of the Human Rights Protection Party.

Salausa trained as a doctor and worked as an ObGyn at LBJ Tropical Medical Center in American Samoa for 20 years. He moved to Samoa after retiring in 2011. He was first elected to the Legislative Assembly of Samoa in the 2016 Samoan general election and appointed Associate Minister of Health. He lost his seat in the 2021 election. An election petition by him was struck out in June 2021.

== Recognition ==
In 2017 he was awarded the P.S.R.H. President's Medal by the Pacific Society for Reproductive Health.
