= Tuia Fuatogi Puʻa Letoa =

Samoan politician

Member of the Samoan Parliament for Safata 2
- Incumbent
- Assumed office 18 August 2026
- Preceded by: Vacant
- In office 16 September 2025 – 26 May 2026
- Preceded by: Laumatiamanu Ringo Purcell
- Succeeded by: Vacant

Personal details
- Party: FAST (since 2026); HRPP (until 2026)

Tuia Logoiai Puʻa Fuatogi Letoa is a Samoan politician who has served as a member of the Legislative Assembly of Samoa and associate minister since 2026. He is a member of the Faʻatuatua i le Atua Samoa ua Tasi (FAST) party.

Letoa is a former chief executive of Samoa Airways. Following the sinking of HMNZS Manawanui in 2024 he called for the New Zealand government to compensate villagers in Safata for environmental damage, and also approached the Chinese government for assistance.

He was first elected to the Legislative Assembly at the 2025 Samoan general election as a candidate for the Human Rights Protection Party (HRPP), after winning the Safata 2 seat. Letoa defected from the HRPP to join FAST in May 2026, citing the wishes of his district chiefs. He subsequently resigned from parliament on 26 May to comply with the Electoral Act, which mandates that a representative vacate their seat should they change their affiliation during a parliamentary term, triggering a by-election. Letoa reclaimed the seat during the by-election, he received 891 votes and defeated two independent candidates. He was sworn back into parliament on 18 August and was appointed as an associate minister responsible for the ombudsman's office and the Legislative Assembly. Leleua Suataga Aso, who placed second in the by-election, filed an electoral petition against Letoa, accusing him of six counts of election bribery. The Supreme Court dismissed the petition on 9 October.

Legislative Assembly of Samoa
Preceded by Laumatiamanu Ringo Purcell	Member of Parliament for Safata 2; 2025–2026	Vacant
Vacant	Member of Parliament for Safata 2; 2026–present	Incumbent
