= Tafua Maluelue Tafua =

Samoan politician

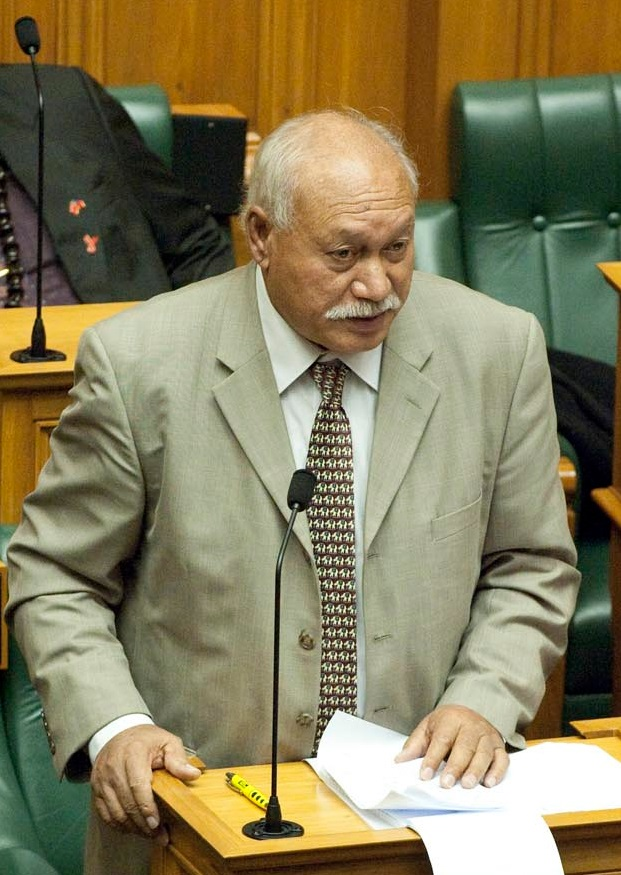
- Tafua Maluelue Tafua speaking in the New Zealand Parliament, 2013

Member of the Samoa Parliament for Aleipata Itupa-I-Lalo
- In office 4 March 2011 – 9 April 2021
- Preceded by: Muagututi’ a Siaosi Meredith
- Succeeded by: Fiugalu Eteuati Eteuati

Personal details
- Party: Human Rights Protection Party

Tafua Maluelue Tafua (also known as Michael Tafua) is a Samoan politician and former member of the Legislative Assembly of Samoa. He is a member of the Human Rights Protection Party.

== Life and career in New Zealand ==
Tafua moved to New Zealand in 1974, where he became an officer in the New Zealand Police. While working as a police officer he participated in the Dawn Raids aimed at deporting Pasifika overstayers. He served as a police officer for 23 years, resigning in 1996 in protest at the low sentence given to the drunk-driver who had killed his son.

In 1992 he was elected to the Birkenhead-Northcote Community Board. In 1998 he was elected to the North Shore City Council. He was re-elected to the council in the 2001 local body elections and again in 2004.

== Return to Samoa ==
In 2004 he was appointed paramount chief of the village of Saleaaumua in the Atua District. He resigned from the council in August 2007.

After returning to Samoa he served as a member of the Public Service Commission from 2007 until 2010. He was first elected to the Legislative Assembly of Samoa in the 2011 election and appointed Associate Minister to the Prime Minister. In 2013 he called for New Zealand to change its immigration policy and make it easier for Samoans to work in New Zealand. He later attended the 2013 Pacific Parliamentary Forum in New Zealand.

He was re-elected in the 2016 election but not reappointed as an Associate Minister. He lost his seat in the 2021 election. During an election petition over his loss, he admitted to past electoral corruption. The court hearing the petition dismissed the five charges of bribery levelled against him.

== Personal life ==
Tafua is the older brother of Manu Samoa coach Titimaea Tafua.
