= Fepuleai Faʻasavalu Faimata Suʻa =

Samoan politician

Fepuleai Faimata Su'a

Member of the Samoan Parliament for Salega No. 1
- Incumbent
- Assumed office 9 April 2021
- Preceded by: To'omata Aki Tuipea

Personal details
- Party: Tautua Samoa Party; Fa'atuatua i le Atua Samoa ua Tasi

Fepuleai Fa'asavalu Faimata Su'a (born ~1974) is a Samoan politician and Member of the Legislative Assembly of Samoa. He is a member of the FAST Party.

Fepuleai is a businessman. He ran as a candidate for the Tautua Samoa Party in the 2016 election but was unsuccessful. He was first elected to the Legislative Assembly of Samoa in the 2021 Samoan general election, defeating Tautua leader Afualo Wood Salele. A subsequent election petition by Afualo against him was unsuccessful. On 28 July 2021 he was appointed Associate Minister of Police and Fire and Emergency Services.

In August 2022 he was issued a traffic offence notice and fined $100 tala after crashing his ministerial vehicle. In November 2023 he was sacked as an associate minister after travelling to American Samoa without a travel permit.

In February 2024 he was charged with fabricating evidence and conspiracy to defeat the course of justice over a hit and run incident.
