= 2021 Samoan by-elections =

By-elections held in Samoa in 2021

- 26 November 2021

7 of the 51 seats in the Legislative Assembly of Samoa
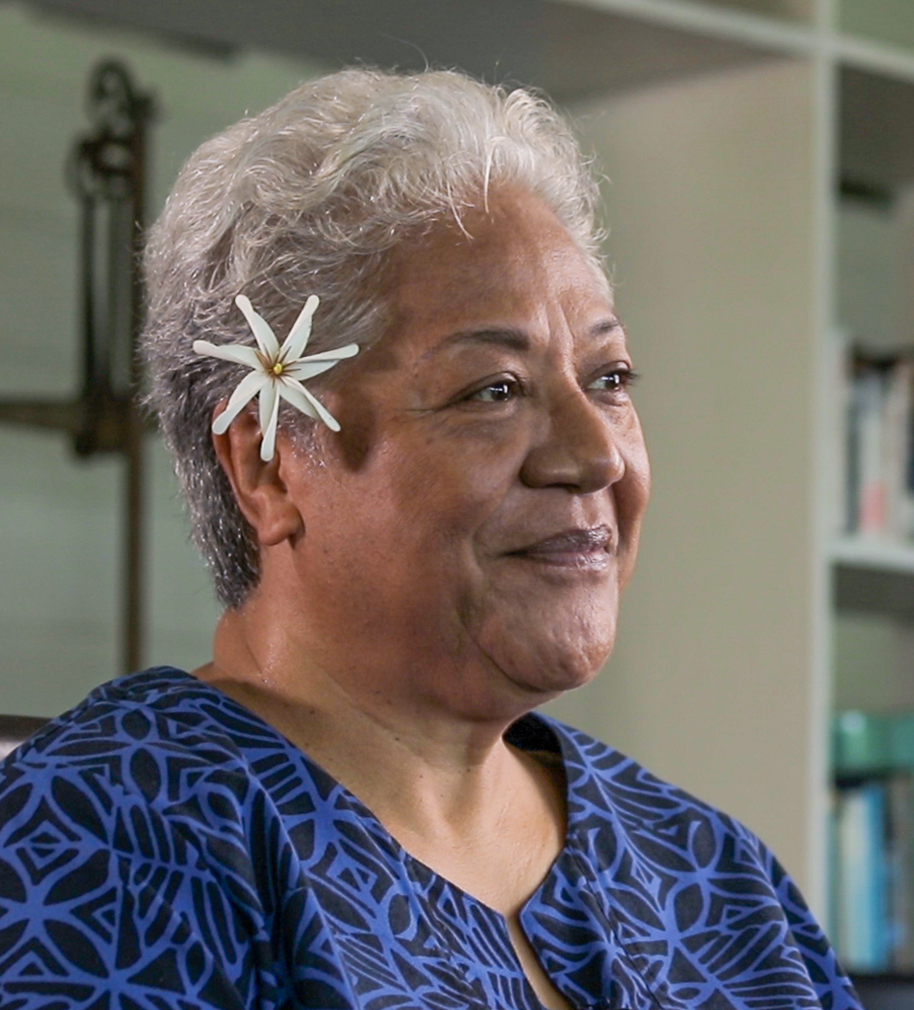

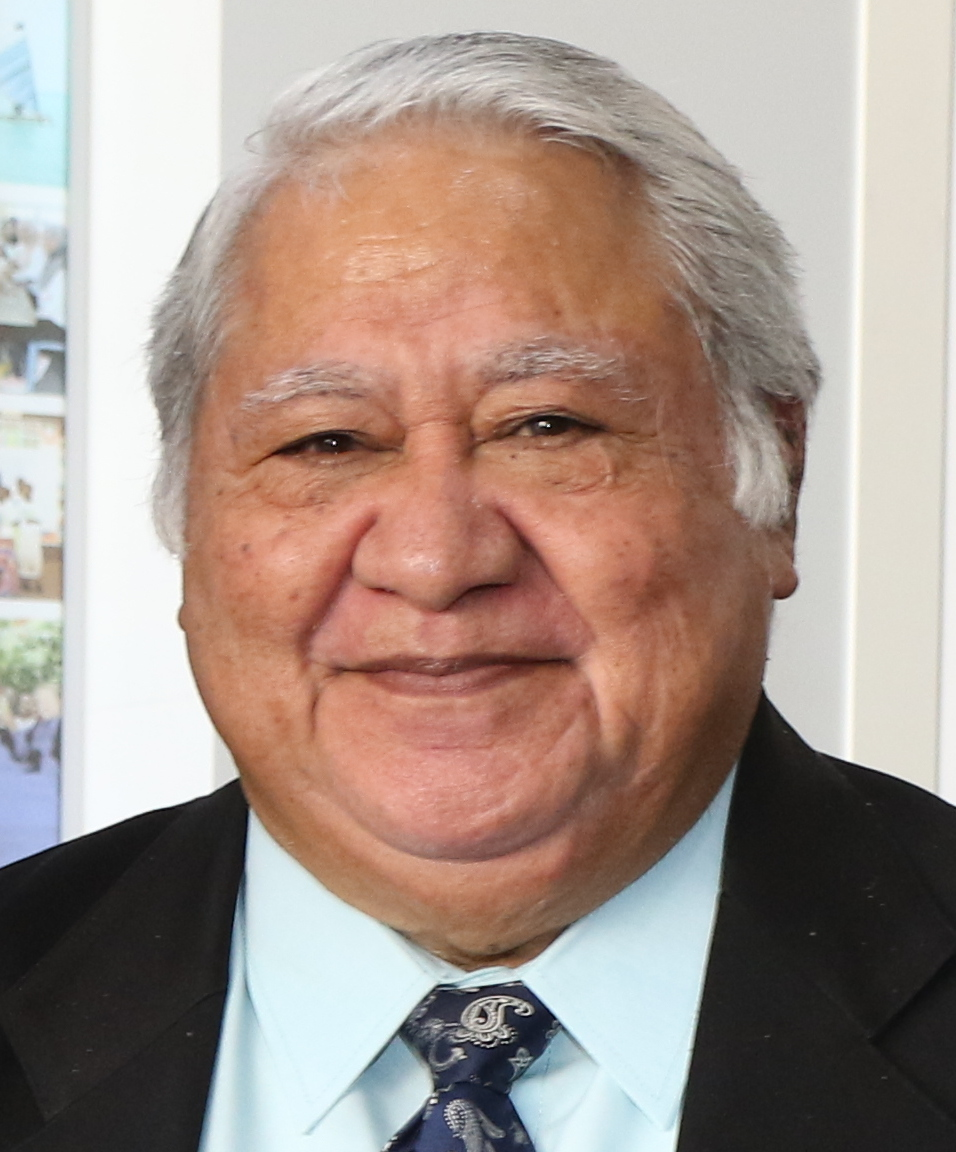
	First party	Second party
Leader	Fiamē Naomi Mataʻafa	Tuila'epa Sa'ilele Malielegaoi
Party	FAST	HRPP
Seats before	26	18
Seats after	31	20
Seat change	▲5	▲2

Six simultaneous by-elections were held in Samoa on 26 November 2021. They were called in the aftermath of the 2021 Samoan general election, which resulted in seven seats being vacant due to resignations and convictions for bribery and treating. While seven by-elections were called, the contest in Falealupo was resolved without the need for a poll, after the Supreme Court declared the HRPP candidate Tuitogamanaia Peniamina Le'avai to be ineligible, resulting in the FAST Party's Fuiono Tenina Crichton being elected unopposed.

The FAST party won four seats, and the HRPP two. Following the by-election, the electoral commission declared Ali'imalemanu Alofa Tuuau and Faagasealii Sapoa Feagiai elected under the women's quota.

== Candidates ==
Formal nominations opened on 1 November 2021, but the parties publicly announced candidates before then. 22 candidates were nominated in total: 10 from FAST, 9 from the HRPP, one from the Tautua Samoa Party, and two independents. One candidate was rejected.

FAST nominated former Manu Samoa coach Titimaea Tafua to contest Aleipata-Itupa-i-Lalo. The HRPP nominated a single candidate, Fa'agaseali'i Sapoa Feagiai. The Tautua Samoa Party nominated Su’a Samuelu Su’a to contest the seat, but he subsequently withdrew his nomination.

The HRPP nominated two candidates for A'ana Alofi No. 2: 2021 candidate Apenamoemanatunatu Tu'uau Letaulau and former MP Aiono Tile Gafa. FAST renominated its 2021 election candidate Lolomatauama Eseta Mataituli. Former Tautua candidate Faletutulu Ameti Faletutulu ran as an independent.

The HRPP nominated Leleimalefaga Fonotia Ne'emia for Falealili No. 2. FAST nominated two candidates, Fuimaono Ta'ala La'auli Talataina and Maiava Fuimaono Tito.

Each party nominated a single candidate for Falealupo, with FAST renominating Fuiono Tenina Crichton and the HRPP nominating Tuitogamanaia Peniamina Le'avai. Crichton subsequently challenged Le'avai's eligibility to stand. On 22 November 2021 the Supreme Court ruled that Tuitogamanaia was ineligible to stand and disqualified him from the by-election, meaning Crichton was elected unopposed.

Each party also nominated a single candidate for Safata No 2.

FAST nominated three candidates in Sagaga No. 2, against 2 for the HRPP. The HRPP nominated two candidates, Maulolo Tavita Amosa and Faamausili Siona. Vaotuua Michael Toevai ran as an independent.

Each party nominated a single candidate for Sagaga No. 4, with FAST nominating Tagaloatele Pasi Poloa and the HRPP renominating its election candidate Tuisa Tasi Patea.

== Conduct ==
The by-elections were originally planned for 12 November, and a warrant issued on 13 October. The next day the Speaker announced a new date of 26 November, attributing the delay to the different causes of the seats being vacant.

In the lead up to the elections the government amended the Electoral Act to restore the use of special voting booths for those outside their constituency, reduce the pre-polling period, and limit the ability of village officials to block candidates.

FAST candidate for Falealupo Fuiono Tenina Crichton challenged the eligibility of 186 voters for not being resident in the electorate. He withdrew the challenge on 25 October. A week out from the by-election, Fuiono filed a court case challenging the eligibility of his opponent Tuitogamanaia Peniamina Junior Leavai's candidacy.

Faalogo Ivin Chan K. Tong, one of the FAST party’s candidates for the Sagaga No. 2 electorate, was ejected from his village of Malie on 17 November. Faalogo violated a village council decision prohibiting any further campaigning in Malie, leading to his banishment. Village chiefs denied the decision as being politically motivated.

== Campaign ==
FAST began its campaign on 23 October with a roadshow in Saleaumua, and planned to use similar tactics to those used in the April elections.

The HRPP initially denied they would hold roadshow events, which they had objected to as "a foreign practice" during the 2021 election campaign. However, they began their campaign on 22 October with a roadshow-style event in Falealili 2. The party conducted a negative campaign, accusing the government of being liars and of using public money to campaign. On 24 October HRPP secretary Lealailepule Rimoni Aiafi accused the Samoa Observer of being "campaign managers" for the government after it had criticised his party.

Pre-polling began on 24 November.

== Results ==
Preliminary results showed the FAST Party winning four seats: Falealili No. 2, Aleipata-i-Lalo, Sagaga No. 4 and Safata No. 2. The HRPP narrowly won the other two seats, A’ana Alofi No. 2 and Sagaga No. 2. A full recount on 29 November confirmed the preliminary results.

=== By constituency ===
From the Electoral Commission's final results:

Sagaga No. 2
Party	Candidate	Votes	%	±%
HRPP	Maulolo Tavita Amosa	677		
FAST	Faalogo Ivin Chan K. Tong	614		
FAST	Fata Ryan Schuster	476		
HRPP	Fa’amausili Siona Tauafao	324		
FAST	Fata Meafou	292		
Independent	Vaotuua Michael Toevai	22		
Turnout		2,405		
HRPP hold		Swing	+10	

Sagaga No. 4
Party	Candidate	Votes	%	±%
FAST	Tagaloatele Pasi Poloa	1,217		
HRPP	Tuisa Tulimasealii Tasi Patea	801		
Turnout		2,018		
FAST gain from HRPP		Swing	+18	

Aana Alofi No. 2
Party	Candidate	Votes	%	±%
HRPP	Aiono Tile Gafa	412	36.75%	
FAST	Lolomatauama Eseta Faalata Mataituli	393	35.06%	
HRPP	Apenamoemanatunatu Tuuau Letaulau	220	19.62%	
Independent	Faletutulu Ameti Faletutulu	96	8.56%	
Turnout		1,121		
HRPP hold		Swing	-15	

Safata No. 2
Party	Candidate	Votes	%	±%
FAST	Laumatiamanu Ringo Purcell	936		
HRPP	Nonu Lose Niumata	798		
Turnout		1,734		
FAST gain from HRPP		Swing	+29	

Falealili No. 2
Party	Candidate	Votes	%	±%
FAST	Maiava Fuimaono Asafo	577		
HRPP	Leleimalefaga Neemia Fonotia	396		
FAST	Fuimaono Laauli Talataina	174		
Turnout		1,147		
FAST gain from HRPP		Swing	+11	

Aleipata Itupa i Lalo
Party	Candidate	Votes	%	±%
FAST	Faleomavaega Titimaea Tafua	1,146	64	
HRPP	Faagasealii Sapoa Feagiai	642	36	
Turnout		1,788		
FAST gain from HRPP		Swing	+54	

== Aftermath ==
The Electoral Commissioner's decision to appoint additional woman MP's under the women's quota before the deadline for election petitions had passed enraged members of the government, who believed it to be unlawful. FAST candidate for Aana Alofi 2, Lolomatauama Eseta Faalata, announced that she was planning an election petition, and that she planned to challenge the appointments. The speaker of the Legislative Assembly, Papali’i Li’o Taeu Masipau, announced on 10 December that the swearing-in of the two female MPs declared elected via the female parliamentary membership quota would not occur until the Supreme Court finalised legal challenges on their appointment. The HRPP announced they would challenge the decision in court.

Electoral petitions were filed challenging the election of Fuimaono Maiava Tito in Falealili No. 2 and Maulolo Tavita Amosa in Sagaga No. 2. These petitions were subsequently dropped. Former FAST candidate To'omata Norah Leota also lodged a challenge, seeking to overturn the calculation used to apply the women's quota.

On 12 May 2022 the Supreme Court, although noting the declaration had been premature, confirmed the election of the two additional members. The court additionally declared To'omata elected as a third additional member due to the resignation of Leota Tima Leavai and her subsequent replacement by a man. The Supreme Court noted in its decision that when a man is elected to fill a constituency seat vacancy previously held by a woman, the constitutional requirement for a woman to also be elected as an additional member is separate from the quota requirement. Thus there are now a record 7 women parliamentarians.
