= Soʻoalo Umi Feo Mene =

Samoan politician

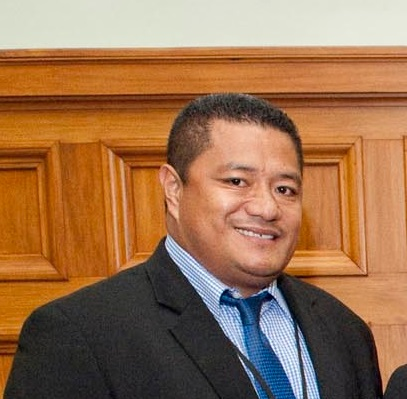
- Mene in 2013

Member of the Samoan Parliament for Gagaifomauga No. 2
- In office 4 March 2011 – 9 April 2021
- Preceded by: Safuneituʻuga Paʻaga Neri
- Succeeded by: Vaʻele Paʻiaʻaua Iona Sekuini

Personal details
- Party: Independent, Human Rights Protection Party

Soʻoalo Umi Feo Mene is a Samoan politician and former member of the Legislative Assembly of Samoa. He is a member of the Human Rights Protection Party.

Mene was first elected to parliament as an independent in the 2011 Samoan general election and was appointed Associate Minister for Commerce, Industry and Labour after joining the HRPP. He was re-elected in the 2016 election and appointed Associate Minister of Revenue. He was later moved to the Prisons, and then the Justice portfolio.

In September 2017 he was accused of a conflict of interest after being moved to the prisons portfolio, as his wife was working as Assistant Chief Executive Officer of the Ministry of Prisons and Correction Services.

In April 2020 he was investigated by police over an allegation of domestic violence. In June 2020 he was referred for counselling after the complaints were withdrawn.

He lost his seat in the 2021 election. He subsequently registered as a candidate in the 2022 Gagaifomauga 2 By-election, but withdrew his candidacy to support Soʻoalo Fineaso Poka.

At the 2025 election he became a founding member of the Samoa Labour Party.

Legislative Assembly of Samoa
Preceded by Safuneituʻuga Paʻaga Neri	Member of Parliament for Gaga'ifomauga 2; 2011–2021	Succeeded by Vaʻele Paʻiaʻaua Iona Sekuini
