= Foʻisala Lilo Tuʻu Ioane =

Samoan politician

Member of the Samoan Parliament for Gagaʻifomauga No. 2
- Incumbent
- Assumed office 21 June 2022
- Preceded by: Vaʻele Paʻiaʻaua Iona Sekuini

Personal details
- Party: Independent; Faʻatuatua i le Atua Samoa ua Tasi (2022–present)

Foʻisala Lilo Tuʻu Ioane (born 1972) is a Samoan politician and member of the Legislative Assembly of Samoa. He was elected as an Independent politician, but has now joined the FAST party.

Foʻisala is a farmer and businessman from Lefagaoaliʻi. He had wanted to contest the Gaga'ifomauga 2 constituency in the 2021 Samoan general election, but opted out for personal reasons. He was elected to the Legislative Assembly of Samoa in the 2022 Gagaʻifomauga 2 by-election. He ran as an independent after failing to secure the endorsement of the Faʻatuatua i le Atua Samoa ua Tasi (FAST) Party, but announced that he would join FAST if elected.

Following the election Foʻisala joined the FAST party. He was sworn in on 21 June 2022. On 6 July 2022 he was sworn in as Associate Minister for Health. On 17 January 2025 he was fired as an associate minister by prime minister Fiamē Naomi Mataʻafa after supporting her expulsion from the FAST party.

Legislative Assembly of Samoa
Preceded by Va'ele Pa'ia'aua Iona Sekuini	Member of Parliament for Gaga'ifomauga No. 2; 2022–present	Incumbent
