= Samoa Labour Party =

Political party in Samoa

- Abbreviation: SLP
- Leader: Vacant
- Founders: Faʻaolesa Katopau Ainuʻu; Soʻoalo Umi Feo Mene; Tuisa Tasi Patea; Suʻa Tanielu Suʻa
- Founded: 14 May 2025
- Registered: 6 June 2025
- Split from: Human Rights Protection Party
- Colours: Green; Blue
- Slogan: E tāua tagata uma

Website
- www.samoalabourparty.ws

The Samoa Labour Party is a political party in Samoa. The party was established in May 2024 by several former members of the Human Rights Protection Party (HRPP), including Faʻaolesa Katopau Ainuʻu, Soʻoalo Umi Feo Mene, Tuisa Tasi Patea, and former HRPP candidate Su’a Tanielu Su’a. It was registered with the electoral commission in June 2025.

During the 2025 Samoan general election, the party announced that it would be running 14 candidates. Its electoral policies included a national family welfare scheme, increasing the minimum wage, and turning Samoa into a manufacturing and trading hub using an export processing zone. It also stated its aim to be part of a coalition government and advance its policies through coalition negotiations.

== Election results ==
=== Legislative Assembly elections ===
Election	Leader	Votes	%	Seats	+/–	Rank	Status
2025	Faʻaolesa Katopau Ainuʻu	966	1.08	0 / 51	New	4th	Extra-parliamentary
