= 2011 Samoan by-elections =

Four simultaneous by-elections were held in Samoa on 29 July 2011. They followed on from the general election on 4 March, after which the results in several constituencies had been challenged. The Supreme Court voided

- the election of Va'ai Papu Vailupe (of the Tautua Samoa Party) in the Vaisigano No.1 constituency due to bribery and treating,
- the election of Alai'asa Filipo Schwartz Hunt (elected as an independent, but who had then joined the Human Rights Protection Party) in the Anoamaa East constituency due to corruption,
- the election of Taua Kitiona Seuala (of the Human Rights Protection Party) in the Aleipata Itupa I Luga constituency due to corruption, and
- the election of Tavu'i Tiafau Salevao (of the Human Rights Protection Party) in the Satupaitea constituency due to bribery and treating.

Consequently, by-elections were held for those four seats to the Legislative Assembly. The governing Human Rights Protection Party won all four by-elections, giving it a total of 37 seats out of 49 in the Assembly, one more than it had had following the general election. The opposition Tautua Samoa Party was left with 12 seats.

== Results ==
The results were as follows.

2011 Aleipata Itupa I Luga by-election
Party	Candidate	Votes	%	±%
HRPP	Fagaaivalu Kenrick Samu	491	35.2	−21.5
unknown	Taua Latu Lome	281	20.2	n/a
unknown	Seuala Patone Seuala	227	16.3	n/a
unknown	Feagai Keti	226	16.2	n/a
unknown	Augafaapea Panoa Malaga	168	12	n/a
HRPP hold		Swing	-21.5	

2011 Anomaʻa East by-election
Party	Candidate	Votes	%	±%
HRPP	Alo Fulifuli Taveuveu	729	44.6	+13
unknown	Tainau Moefaauo Titimaea	592	36.2	n/a
HRPP	Gagaeolo Manase Reupena	256	15.7	+8.9
TSP	Alaiasa Elena	58	3.5	+0.4
HRPP gain from Independent		Swing	-13.9	

2011 Satupaitea by-election
Party	Candidate	Votes	%	±%
HRPP	Lautafi Fio Selafi Purcell	447	47.5	−1.6
HRPP	Asiata Wairaki Toevai	302	32.1	−8.3
unknown	Faanana Lematua Taaau	193	20.5	n/a
HRPP hold		Swing	-1.6	

2011 Vaisigano No.1 by-election
Party	Candidate	Votes	%	±%
HRPP	Tufuga Gafoleata Faitua	799	54.8	+13
unknown	Malolo Tui Vaai	439	30.1	n/a
TSP	Lealiifanolevalevale Iopu Tanielu	220	15.1	−29
HRPP gain from TSP		Swing	+10.7	

== Results at the prior general election ==
2011 general election in Aleipata Itupa I Luga
Party	Candidate	Votes	%	±%
HRPP	Taua Kitiona Seuala	1009	56.7	
Independent	Fuataga Kasimani	771	43.3	
HRPP hold		Swing		

2011 general election in Anoamaa East
Party	Candidate	Votes	%	±%
Independent	Alaiasa Filipo Schwarts Hunt	1094	58.5	
HRPP	Moefaauo Lufilufi	592	31.6	
Independent	Gagaeolo Manase Reupena	127	6.8	
TSP	Tofae Alailima	58	3.1	
Independent gain from HRPP		Swing		

2011 general election in Satupaitea
Party	Candidate	Votes	%	±%
HRPP	Tavui Tiafau Tafu Salevao	457	49.1	
HRPP	Asiata Wairaki Toevai	376	40.4	
TSP	Aloiamoa Tua Savaii	98	10.3	
HRPP gain from SDUP		Swing		

2011 general election in Vaisigano No.1
Party	Candidate	Votes	%	±%
TSP	Va'ai Papu Vailupe	731	44.1	
HRPP	Tufuga Gafoaleata Faitua	693	41.8	
HRPP	Taavao Tiaina Tapu	233	14.1	
TSP hold		Swing		
