= Tagaloatele Pasi Poloa =

Samoan politician

Member of the Samoa Parliament for Sagaga No. 4
- Incumbent
- Assumed office 26 November 2021
- Preceded by: Tuisa Tasi Patea

Personal details
- Party: Fa'atuatua i le Atua Samoa ua Tasi

Papali’i Tagaloatele Pasi Poloa (born ~1949) is a Samoan politician and Member of the Legislative Assembly of Samoa. He is a member of the FAST Party.

Tagaloatele is from Saleimoa and Aleisa and works as a sports administrator. In 2017 he was elected president of the Samoa Amateur Boxing Association in a contested AGM, leading to a court case which overturned the results. In 2018 he was elected president of the Samoa Boxing Federation.

He ran for election in the 2021 Samoan general election in the seat of Sagaga No. 4, but was unsuccessful. He subsequently challenged the winning candidate, Tuisa Tasi Patea, in an election petition, forcing him to step down. He was elected to the legislative Assembly of Samoa in the resulting by-election, with a lead of over 400 votes on the preliminary count.

On 17 January 2025 he was fired as an associate minister by prime minister Fiamē Naomi Mataʻafa after supporting her expulsion from the FAST party.
