= Toʻomata Aki Tuipea =

Samoan politician

Member of the Samoan Parliament for Salega West
- In office 4 March 2016 – 9 April 2021
- Preceded by: Afualo Wood Salele
- Succeeded by: Fepuleai Faasavalu Faimata Sua

Personal details
- Party: Human Rights Protection Party

Toʻomata Aki Tuipea is a Samoan politician and former member of the Legislative Assembly of Samoa. He is a member of the Human Rights Protection Party.

Toʻmata is an accountant and businessman. He has worked as an auditor for the Samoan and New Zealand governments and manages the Agriculture Store Corporation. He was first elected to the Legislative Assembly at the 2016 Samoan general election. He lost his seat at the 2021 election.
