= Safuneituʻuga Paʻaga Neri =

Samoan politician

Minister of Communication and Technology
- In office 15 November 2006 – 21 March 2011
- Prime Minister: Tuilaepa Aiono Sailele Malielegaoi
- Preceded by: Mulitalo Siafausa Vui
- Succeeded by: Tuisugaletaua Sofara Aveau

Member of the Samoa Parliament for Gagaifomauga No. 2
- In office 2 March 2001 – 4 March 2011
- Preceded by: Feo Nemaia Esau
- Succeeded by: Soʻoalo Umi Feo Mene

Personal details
- Party: Human Rights Protection Party

Safuneituʻuga Paʻaga Neri is a Samoan politician and former Cabinet Minister. She was the third Samoan woman ever appointed to Cabinet. She is a member of the Human Rights Protection Party.

Neri is from Safune on the island of Savaiʻi. She worked as an Education lecturer at the National University of Samoa. She was first elected to the Legislative Assembly of Samoa as an independent in the 2001 election. She was re-elected in the 2006 election, and was appointed Minister of Communication and Technology following the removal from office of Mulitalo Siafausa Vui. As Minister she planned the privatisation of the Samoa Broadcasting Corporation, and of SamoaTel.

She lost her seat in the 2011 election. She later served as a member of the Public Service Commission from 2012 - 2018.
