= Sovereign Independent Samoa Party =

Samoan political party

Sovereign Independent Samoa Party Faafaletui a le Vaega Faaupufai o le Pulega Aoao Samoa Tutoatasi
- Abbreviation: SIS
- Leader: Fesola'i Logomalieimatagi Tepa Toloa
- Founded: 30 April 2020
- Ideology: Pro-Land and Titles Bill; Women's rights
- Legislative Assembly: 0 / 53

Website
- Facebook page

The Sovereign Independent Samoa Party (Samoan: Faafaletui a le Vaega Faaupufai o le Pulega Aoao Samoa Tutoatasi) is a political party in Samoa. The party was established in April 2020 and is led by Fesola'i Logomalieimatagi Tepa Toloa. It contested the 2021 Samoan general election.

The party was officially launched on 2 September 2020. It nominated only one candidate for the 2021 election. On 11 December 2020 the party announced an electoral alliance with the Tautua Samoa Party and Samoa First Party, under which the parties would support each other's candidates in seats where they are not running against one another.

During the 2021 election the party's sole candidate was unsuccessful, earning a total of 30 votes.

== Electoral history ==
Election	Votes	%	Seats	+/–	Rank	Status
2021	30	0.03	0 / 51	New	5th	Extra-parliamentary
