= Manuleleua Paletasala Tovale =

Samoan politician

Member of the Samoa Parliament for Faleata No. 1
- In office 9 April 2021 – 29 August 2025
- Preceded by: Salausa John Ah Ching
- Succeeded by: Faumuina Opapo Soanai Oeti

Personal details
- Party: Fa'atuatua i le Atua Samoa ua Tasi

Manuleleua Paletasala Tovale is a Samoan politician and former member of the Legislative Assembly of Samoa. He is a member of the FAST Party.

He was first elected to the Legislative Assembly of Samoa in the 2021 Samoan general election. An election petition against him was struck out in June 2021. On 28 July 2021 he was appointed Associate Minister for the Prime Minister and Cabinet. On 17 January 2025 he was fired as an associate minister by prime minister Fiamē Naomi Mataʻafa after supporting her expulsion from the FAST party.

He lost his seat in the 2025 Samoan general election.
