= Fuiono Tenina Crichton =

Samoan politician

Member of the Samoa Parliament for Falealupo
- In office 22 November 2021 – 29 August 2025
- Preceded by: Leota Tima Leavai
- Succeeded by: Aeau Tima Leavaiseeta

Personal details
- Born: 1951 (age 74–75)
- Party: Fa'atuatua i le Atua Samoa ua Tasi

Fuiono Tenina Crichton (born 1951) is a Samoan politician and Member of the Legislative Assembly of Samoa. He is a member of the FAST Party.

Fuiono first ran for election in the 2021 Samoan general election. After being defeated by Leota Tima Leavai he challenged her election in an election petition, forcing her resignation. He stood again in the subsequent by-election, where he was declared elected unopposed after successfully challenging his only opponent's eligibility to stand.

On 17 January 2025 he was fired as an associate minister by prime minister Fiamē Naomi Mataʻafa after supporting her expulsion from the FAST party. He stepped down at the 2025 election.
