= Seuʻula Ioane =

Samoan politician

The Honourable Seuʻula Ioane

Minister of Education (Note: Education, Sports and Culture until 2023)
- In office 24 May 2021 – 16 September 2025 (Note: Disputed: 24 May 2021 – 23 July 2021)
- Prime Minister: Fiamē Naomi Mataʻafa
- Preceded by: Loau Keneti Sio
- Succeeded by: Aiono Alec Ekeroma

Member of the Samoan Parliament for Alataua West
- In office 24 May 2021 – 3 June 2025
- Preceded by: Aliʻimalemanu Alofa Tuuau
- Succeeded by: Taituave Lafaitele Valoaga Iona

Personal details
- Born: 1957 (age 68–69)
- Party: Samoa Uniting Party (since 2025)
- Other political affiliations: Faʻatuatua i le Atua Samoa ua Tasi (until 2025)

Seuʻula Ioane Tuʻuau (born ~1957) is a Samoan politician and former Cabinet Minister. He is a member of the Samoa Uniting Party (SUP).

Seuʻula is from the village of Tufutafoe. He is a former school teacher and principal, and served as principal of Tufutafoe Primary School for 20 years. He was elected to the Legislative Assembly of Samoa in the 2021 Samoan general election as a Faʻatuatua i le Atua Samoa ua Tasi (FAST) candidate, defeating Aliʻimalemanu Alofa Tuuau. When Tuuau was declared elected under the women's quota on 20 April 2021, he was a party to the court challenge which saw her appointment overturned.

On 24 May 2021 he was appointed Minister of Education, Sports and Culture in the elected cabinet of Fiamē Naomi Mataʻafa. The appointment was disputed by the caretaker government. On 23 July 2021 the Court of Appeal ruled that the swearing-in ceremony was constitutional and binding, and that FAST had been the government since 24 May.

In October 2021 he graduated from the National University of Samoa with a Bachelors of Education.

Prime Minister Mataʻafa called a snap election following the government's budget defeat in parliament on 27 May 2025. Following the dissolution of parliament, Seuʻula, Mataʻafa and the rest of cabinet confirmed their resignations from FAST and established the SUP. Seuʻula initially filed to run in the 2025 election, but later withdrew. His tenure as education minister ended on 16 September, and he was succeeded by Aiono Alec Ekeroma.

Seuʻula is married with six children and eight grandchildren. He is a member of the Assembly of God Church.

== Notes ==
Legislative Assembly of Samoa
Preceded by Aliʻimalemanu Alofa Tuuau	Member of Parliament for Alataua West; 2021–2025	Succeeded by Taituave Lafaitele Valoaga Iona
Political offices
Preceded by Loau Keneti Sio	Minister of Education; 2021–2025	Succeeded by Aiono Alec Ekeroma
