= Seiuli Ueligitone Seiuli =

Samoan politician

Member of the Samoa Parliament for Sagaga No. 2
- In office 17 April 2015 – 18 June 2021
- Preceded by: Muagututagata Peter Ah Him
- Succeeded by: Maulolo Tavita Amosa

Personal details
- Party: Human Rights Protection Party

Seiuli Ueligitone Seiuli is a Samoan politician and a former member of the Legislative Assembly of Samoa. He is a member of the Human Rights Protection Party.

Seiuli was first elected to the Legislative Assembly of Samoa at the 2015 Sagaga-le-Usoga by-election. He was re-elected in the 2016 election and appointed Associate Minister of Works, Transport and Infrastructure. In October 2018 he was one of a group of chiefs charged with contempt of court for bestowing the Malietoa title in violation of a court order.

He was re-elected at the 2021 election, but his election was overturned by an election petition, which found him guilty of bribery and treating and banned him from office for 15 years.
