= Fiugalu Eteuati Eteuati =

Samoan politician

Member of the Samoa Parliament for Aleipata Itupa i Lalo
- In office 9 April 2021 – 5 July 2021
- Preceded by: Tafua Maluelue Tafua
- Succeeded by: Titimaea Tafua

Personal details
- Party: Human Rights Protection Party

Fiugalu Eteuati Eteuati is a Samoan politician and former Member of the Legislative Assembly of Samoa. He is a member of the Human Rights Protection Party.

Eteuati was first elected to parliament at the 2021 Samoan general election. His election was challenged in an election petition by defeated HRPP member Tafua Maluelue Tafua. On 5 July 2021 the Supreme Court of Samoa found him guilty of 13 counts of bribery and treating, and voided his election.
