= Samoa First Party =

Samoan political party

Samoa First Faʻamuamua Samoa
- Leader: Unasa Iuni Sapolu
- Founded: July 2018
- Ideology: Samoan nationalism Populism
- Legislative Assembly: 0 / 53

Samoa First (Samoan: Faʻamuamua Samoa), officially the Samoa First Political Party, is a political party in Samoa. The party is nationalist, supporting the protection of customary lands and opposing Chinese immigration. It is led by Unasa Iuni Sapolu.

The party was registered in July 2018. In March 2019 the party unsuccessfully contested the Fa'asalelega No. 2 byelection. Following the by-election the party's candidate, Lema'i Faioso Sione, was banished from his village for not supporting the candidate backed by the village council.

The party held its official launch in February 2020. It then began to prepare to contest the 2021 Samoan general election.

In May 2020 the party joined other opposition parties in calling for the Land and Titles Bill to be delayed.

The party launched its manifesto in October 2020, promising to repeal the Land Titles Registration Act 2008. It initially endorsed 10 candidates for the 2021 election. but ultimately only nominated 6. On 11 December 2020 the party announced an electoral alliance with the Tautua Samoa Party and Sovereign Independent Samoa Party, under which the parties would support each other's candidates in seats where they are not running against one another.

During the 2021 election the party did not win any seats and earned a total of 207 votes nationwide.

== Electoral history ==
Election	Votes	%	Seats	+/–	Rank	Status
2021	207	0.23	0 / 51	New	4th	Extra-parliamentary
