= Fuaava Suluimalo Amataga =

Samoan politician

Member of the Samoa Parliament for Aleipata Itupa i Luga
- Incumbent
- Assumed office 9 April 2021
- Preceded by: Amituanai Fagaivalu Kenrick Samu

Personal details
- Party: Human Rights Protection Party

Fuaava Suluimalo Amataga Penaia (born ~1966) is a Samoan politician. He is a member of the Human Rights Protection Party.

Fuaava is from Lufilufi and was educated at the University of the South Pacific, as well as the University of New England and Griffith University in Australia. From 2001 to 2005 he worked for the Samoa water Authority, before moving to the Ministry of Natural Resources and Environment. After being Assistant Chief Executive, he was Chief Executive of MNRE until 2017. He subsequently was a member of the Samoa Water Authority Board of Directors. He was first elected to the Legislative Assembly of Samoa in the 2021 Samoan general election.
