= Tuisa Tasi Patea =

Samoan politician

Member of the Samoa Parliament for Sagaga No. 4
- In office 9 April 2021 – 28 July 2021
- Preceded by: None (seat established)
- Succeeded by: Tagaloatele Pasi Poloa

Member of the Samoa Parliament for Sagaga-Le-Falefa
- In office 4 March 2011 – 4 March 2016
- Preceded by: Keneti Sio
- Succeeded by: Keneti Sio

Personal details
- Party: Human Rights Protection Party

Tuisa Tulimasealii Tasi Patea is a Samoan politician. He is a member of the Human Rights Protection Party.

Tuisa is a lawyer. He was first elected to the Legislative Assembly of Samoa in the 2011 election and appointed Associate Minister of Police and Prisons. He lost his seat in 2016. He subsequently returned to work as a lawyer. In 2018 he was censured by a District Court judge for giving poor advice to a client.

He was re-elected in the newly created Sagaga No. 4 seat in the 2021 election. On 29 June 2021 he resigned as part of the settlement of an election petition. On 12 July 2021 the Supreme Court of Samoa refused permission for the electoral petitions to be withdrawn in order to hear allegations of bribery and treating against Tuisa and FAST candidate Tagaloatele Poloa. The resignation became effective on 28 July. He subsequently contested the resulting by-election, but was unsuccessful.

At the 2025 election he became a founding member of the Samoa Labour Party.
