= Aveau Niko Palamo =

Samoa international rugby union player & politician

Niko Palamo

Member of the Samoa Parliament for Faleata East
- In office 4 March 2011 – 4 March 2016
- Preceded by: Patau'ave Etuale
- Succeeded by: Salausa John Ah Ching

Personal details
- Party: Tautua Samoa Party

Niko Palamo
- Born: Aveau Tuala Lepale Niko Faitala Palamo date of birth unknown Samoa
- Notable relative(s): Toetu Palamo, Mefi Palamo, Arona Palamo

Rugby union career
- Position: Centre
Senior career
Years	Team	Apps	(Points)
197?-198?	Marist St. Joseph		
International career
Years	Team	Apps	(Points)
1979-1986	Samoa	14	(4)
Coaching career
- Years: Team
- 2008-2009: Samoa

Aveau Tuala Lepale Niko Faitala Palamo is a Samoan rugby player, judge, politician and former member of the Legislative Assembly of Samoa. He is a member of the Tautua Samoa Party.

Aveau is a former Manu Samoa 15s and 7s rugby player and coach. He was elected to the Legislative Assembly of Samoa in the 2011 election, representing the constituency of Faleata East. Aveau beat 3 other candidates from the villages of Vaimoso, Lepea and Vailoa to gain the seat, with a convincing win of more than 200 votes over the second place candidate from Lepea. He ran again in the 2016 election, but was unsuccessful.

Following his departure from politics Palamo coached the Samoa women's national rugby union team. In May 2018 he was appointed Director of the 2019 Pacific Games Committee, but he resigned in November of that year due to differences with the committee.

In December 2019 Palamo was appointed as a judge of the Lands and Titles court.

Sporting positions
Preceded by (New Zealand) Michael Jones	Samoa National Rugby Union Coach; 2008-2009	Succeeded by (Samoa) Titimaea Tafua
