= Vaʻele Paʻiaʻaua Iona Sekuini =

Samoan politician (c. 1964–2022)

Member of the Samoan Parliament for Gagaʻifomauga No. 2
- In office 9 April 2021 – 25 March 2022
- Preceded by: Soʻoalo Umi Feo Mene
- Succeeded by: Foʻisala Lilo Tuʻu Ioane

Personal details
- Born: 1964 Matavai, Western Samoa
- Died: 25 March 2022 (aged 58) Samoa
- Party: Faʻatuatua i le Atua Samoa ua Tasi (F.A.S.T.)

Vaʻele Paʻiaʻaua Iona Sekuini (c.1964 – 25 March 2022) was a Samoan politician and Member of the Legislative Assembly of Samoa. He was a member of the FAST Party.

Va'ele was born in Matavai on the island of Savaiʻi and educated at Safune Primary School, Maluafou College, Le Amosa University and Malua Theological College. He worked as a clerk for the post office, and then for the Department of Public Works and Ministry of Education. After living in Upolu he moved back to Savaiʻi where he ran a shop before starting a farm. He was first elected to the parliament in the 2021 Samoan general election. His election was challenged via an electoral petition from former MP Soʻoalo Umi Feo Mene, but the petition was withdrawn on 7 June 2021. On 28 July 2021 he was appointed Associate Minister of Agriculture. He died on 25 March 2022 from a heart attack. Vaʻele was interred at his residence in Vaitele on 7 April. He was given a formal state funeral in April 2022.

Legislative Assembly of Samoa
Preceded by So’oalo Umi Feo Mene	Member of Parliament for Gaga'ifomauga No. 2; 2021–2022	Succeeded by Fo'isala Lilo Tu'u Ioane
