= Leota Tima Leavai =

Samoan lawyer and politician

Member of the Samoa Parliament for Falealupo
- In office 9 April 2021 – 9 July 2021
- Preceded by: A'eau Peniamina
- Succeeded by: Fuiono Tenina Crichton

Personal details
- Party: Human Rights Protection Party

Aeau Leota Tima Leavai (born ~1970) is a Samoan lawyer and politician. She is the daughter of former MP A'eau Peniamina.

Leavai is a lawyer who runs her own law firm. She contested the April 2021 Samoan general election in her father's seat of Falealupo as a candidate for the Human Rights Protection Party, and won the seat. On 29 June 2021 the Samoa Observer reported that she planned to resign her seat and not run again, as part of the settlement of an electoral petition. She formally resigned on 9 July.

In June 2020 Leavai was awarded the Aeau title by her village.
