= Laumatiamanu Ringo Purcell =

Samoan politician (1967/1968–2026)

Minister of Sports & Recreation
- In office 1 October 2023 – 16 September 2025
- Prime Minister: Fiamē Naomi Mataʻafa
- Preceded by: Office established
- Succeeded by: Seuamuli Fasi Toma

Member of the Samoan Parliament for Safata No. 2
- In office 26 November 2021 – 3 June 2025
- Preceded by: Nonu Lose Niumata
- Succeeded by: Tuia Fuatogi Puʻa Letoa

Personal details
- Born: 1967 or 1968
- Died: 11 January 2026
- Party: Samoa Uniting Party
- Other political affiliations: Faʻatuatua i le Atua Samoa ua Tasi (until 2025)

Laumatiamanu Ringo Purcell (1967 or 1968 – 11 January 2026) was a Samoan politician who served as a Member of the Legislative Assembly of Samoa, and was minister of sports and recreation from 2023 to 2025. He was a member of the Samoa Uniting Party (SUP).

== Life and career ==
Laumatiamanu Ringo Purcell was educated at Saint Joseph's College and was a police officer. He later worked for the Samoa Shipping Corporation. He first ran for election at the 2016 Samoan general election as a candidate for the Human Rights Protection Party. He switched allegiance to the FAST Party to contest the 2021 election, but lost to Nonu Lose Niumata. He subsequently lodged an election petition, resulting in Nonu resigning in a settlement. Both candidates contested the resulting by-election, with Laumatiamanu winning by over 100 votes.

In a cabinet reshuffle on 6 September 2023 he was appointed Minister of Sports & Recreation.

Prime Minister Fiamē Naomi Mataʻafa called a snap election following the government's budget defeat in parliament on 27 May 2025. Purcell ran as an SUP candidate at the 2025 election but lost his seat to Tuia Fuatogi Puʻa Letoa of the HRPP. Purcell's tenure as minister concluded on 16 September, and he was succeeded by Seuamuli Fasi Toma.

Purcell died on 11 January 2026.

Legislative Assembly of Samoa
Preceded by Nonu Lose Niumata	Member of Parliament for Safata No. 2; 2021–2025	Succeeded by Tuia Fuatogi Puʻa Letoa
Political offices
New office	Minister of Sports and Recreation; 2023–2025	Succeeded by Seuamuli Fasi Toma
