= Maiava Fuimaono Asafo =

Samoan politician

Member of the Samoa Parliament for Falealili No. 2
- Incumbent
- Assumed office 26 November 2021
- Preceded by: Fuimaono Teo Samuelu

Personal details
- Party: Faʻatuatua i le Atua Samoa ua Tasi

Maiava Fuimaono Tito Asafo is a Samoan politician. He is a member of the FAST Party.

Maiva ran a bus company before entering politics. He first ran for the Legislative Assembly of Samoa in the 2021 Samoan by-elections as one of two candidates for the FAST Party for Falealili No. 2, and was elected with a lead of 150 votes.

On 17 January 2025 they were fired as an associate minister by prime minister Fiamē Naomi Mataʻafa after supporting her expulsion from the FAST party.
