= Fuimaono Teo Samuelu =

Samoan politician

Fuimaono Te'o Samuelu

Member of the Samoa Parliament for Falealili No. 2
- In office 4 March 2016 – 16 August 2021
- Preceded by: None (Seat established)
- Succeeded by: Maiava Fuimaono Asafo

Personal details
- Party: Human Rights Protection Party

Fuimaono Te'o Samuelu Atiifale is a Samoan politician and former Member of the Legislative Assembly of Samoa. He is a member of the Human Rights Protection Party.

Samuelu was first elected to the Legislative Assembly of Samoa in the 2016 Samoan general election. In July 2019 he was one of 18 MPs who voted in support of Lands & Titles Court President Fepuleai Atila Ropati, who had been convicted for assault, retaining his position. In January 2021, during the leadup to the 2021 election, he criticised former O le Ao o le Malo Tui Atua Tupua Tamasese Efi for appearing at FAST Party campaign events. As a result he was fined by the village of Salani. Fuimaono paid the fine, despite it being an apparent breach of Parliamentary privilege.

He was re-elected in the 2021 election, but his election was subsequently overturned by an election petition.
