= Aliʻimalemanu Alofa Tuuau =

Samoan politician

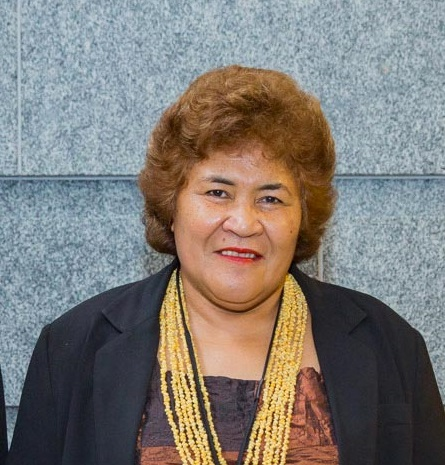
- Aliʻimalemanu Alofa Tuuau in 2016

Member of the Samoan Parliament
- Incumbent
- Assumed office 20 October 2026
- Constituency: Alataua West (Additional Member)
- In office 17 May 2022 – 3 June 2025
- Constituency: Alataua West (Additional Member)
- In office 4 March 2016 – 9 April 2021
- Preceded by: Lafaitele Patrick Leiataualesa
- Succeeded by: Seuula Ioane
- Constituency: Alataua West

Personal details
- Party: Human Rights Protection Party

Aliʻimalemanu Alofa Tuuau is a Samoan politician and member of the Legislative Assembly of Samoa. She is a member of the Human Rights Protection Party.

Tuuau was an accountant before entering politics. She had worked as chief accountant for the Samoa Public Trust Office for thirteen years, as a finance manager for the University of the South Pacific in Fiji for thirteen years, and then as finance manager for the South Pacific Regional Environment Programme (SPREP) in Samoa, where she had worked for fourteen years.

Tuuau was elected to Parliament in the 2016 Samoan general election, representing the constituency of Alataua West. She served as Chair of Parliamentary Committee for Finance and Expenditure. She lives in Apia, but regularly returns to her village on the island of Savaiʻi.

Tuuau has said of women's empowerment: "I don't believe in this saying, 'promoting equal rights', because there are equal rights of women everywhere but it's just that they are not using it" and suggested "we are the problem because we put ourselves down. When I was growing up until I started working, I never struggled because of the non-equal rights...It is us. We don't use it and we have no self-confidence, but it is an issue that we can deal with because it's easy." In parliament, she criticised the language a proposed constitutional amendment that would officially define Samoa as a Christian state on the basis that it was "insufficient, as it apparently lacks real power to limit the spread of potentially fanatical denominations within the country".

Tuuau lost her seat in the 2021 election, but was declared elected on 20 April 2021 by Samoa's electoral commission due to the requirement that a minimum of 10% of seats in parliament must be held by women. On 17 May 2021, the appointment was overturned by the Supreme Court of Samoa.

Following the 2021 Samoan by-elections Tuuau was again appointed to Parliament under the women's quota as an additional member for Alataua West. However, the Speaker of the Legislative Assembly decided to postpone her swearing in until all legal matters regarding it were settled. The Supreme Court later ruled against the speaker's decision and Ali'imalemanu was sworn in 17 May 2022.

Tuuau contested the Alataua West seat again during the 2025 snap election. She lost to Taituave Lafaitele Valoaga Iona of FAST, receiving 477 votes to his 522. As the parliamentary female quota was left unfulfilled after the courts had processed all electoral petitions, Tuuau, as the highest polling unsuccessful female candidate, was again chosen to be an additional member. She was sworn back into parliament on 20 October, increasing the legislature's seat count to 52.

Legislative Assembly of Samoa
Preceded by Lafaitele Patrick Leiataualesa	Member of Parliament for Alataua West; 2016–2021	Succeeded by Seuula Ioane
