= Nonu Lose Niumata =

Samoan politician

Member of the Samoa Parliament for Safata No. 2
- In office 4 March 2016 – 7 July 2021
- Preceded by: None (Seat established)
- Succeeded by: Laumatiamanu Ringo Purcell

Personal details
- Born: Fusi Safata
- Party: Human Rights Protection Party
- Education: Marist Brothers Old Pupils' Association Samoa

Nonu Lose Niumata is a Samoan politician and former Member of the Legislative Assembly of Samoa. He is a member of the Human Rights Protection Party.

Niumata is from the villages of Fusi (Suli moni ole Manu'a le Sagalala), Fausaga (Aiga Toleafoa), Vaie'e (Aiga Te'o) and Tafitoala Safata. He spent 27 years working for Samoa's Accident Compensation Corporation, 20 of them as chief executive officer (CEO). After retiring, he was elected to the Legislative Assembly of Samoa in the 2016 Samoan general election.

He is a Chartered Accountant with Samoa Institute of Accountants, and a former President of Samoa Institute of Accountants for 3 consecutive years.

He was re-elected in the 2021 election. On 7 July 2021 he resigned as part of the settlement of an electoral petition.
