= Faagasealii Sapoa Feagiai =

Samoan politician

Member of the Samoan Parliament for Aleipata-i-Lalo (Note: elected under the women's quota)
- Incumbent
- Assumed office 17 May 2022

Personal details
- Party: Human Rights Protection Party

Faagasealii Sapoa Feagiai is a Samoan politician and member of the Legislative Assembly of Samoa. She is a member of the Human Rights Protection Party.

Fa'agaseali'i is a registered nurse who has previously worked for Samoa's National Kidney Foundation. She has previously run unsuccessfully for election in the 2011 and 2016 elections. She stood as a candidate in the 2021 Samoan by-elections in the seat of Aleipata-i-Lalo, but was unsuccessful, losing to Titimaea Tafua by over 200 votes. Following the by-election she was appointed to parliament under the women's quota as the second-highest-polling unsuccessful female candidate. However, the Speaker of the Legislative Assembly postponed her swearing in until all legal matters regarding it were addressed. The Supreme Court later ruled against the speaker, and she was sworn in on 17 May 2022.
