= Maulolo Tavita Amosa =

Samoan academic and politician

Member of the Samoa Parliament for Sagaga No. 2
- Incumbent
- Assumed office 26 November 2021
- Preceded by: Seiuli Ueligitone Seiuli

Personal details
- Party: Human Rights Protection Party; Samoa Uniting Party

Maulolo Leaula Tavita Uelese Amosa is a Samoan academic, public servant, and politician. He is a member of the Samoa Uniting Party.

Maulolo was the first person to graduate with a Master's degree from the Amosa o Savavau (Indigenous University of Samoa). He later worked as Head of Samoan Studies at the National University of Samoa, as the Director of Internal Affairs, and as a lecturer at the Amosa o Savavau in American Samoa. In 2010 he was Assistant Chief Executive of the Ministry of Women. He is the author of Fausaga o lauga Samoa, a significant work on Samoan oratory.

In February 2019 he claimed that Samoa's diaspora was undermining traditional cultural values of respect and deference in Samoa.

In July 2019 he was summoned for contempt of court for breaching a court order prohibiting construction on a piece of disputed land.

== Political career ==
Maulolo stood for election as an independent in the constituency of Sagaga-le-Usoga at the 2011 Samoan general election, but was unsuccessful. He stood again in 2016 and 2021. He was finally elected to the Legislative Assembly of Samoa as a Human Rights Protection Party candidate at the 2021 Samoan by-elections.

In December 2024 he was found guilty of contempt of court for defying a court order in a land dispute. In February 2025 he was sentenced to a $2,000 fine.

In February 2025 he defied his party to vote for amendments to the constitution which would undo the Land and Titles Bill, the only opposition MP to do so. In May 2025 he broke ranks with the HRPP to vote in support of Fiamē Naomi Mataʻafa's budget.

On 30 May he announced he would leave the HRPP following the dissolution of parliament. In June 2025 he joined the Samoa Uniting Party.
