= 2021 Samoan general election =

- 9 April 2021

All 51 directly elected seats in the Legislative Assembly (and up to 6 additional female MPs)
- Registered: 128,848
- Turnout: 69.47% (▼0.17pp)
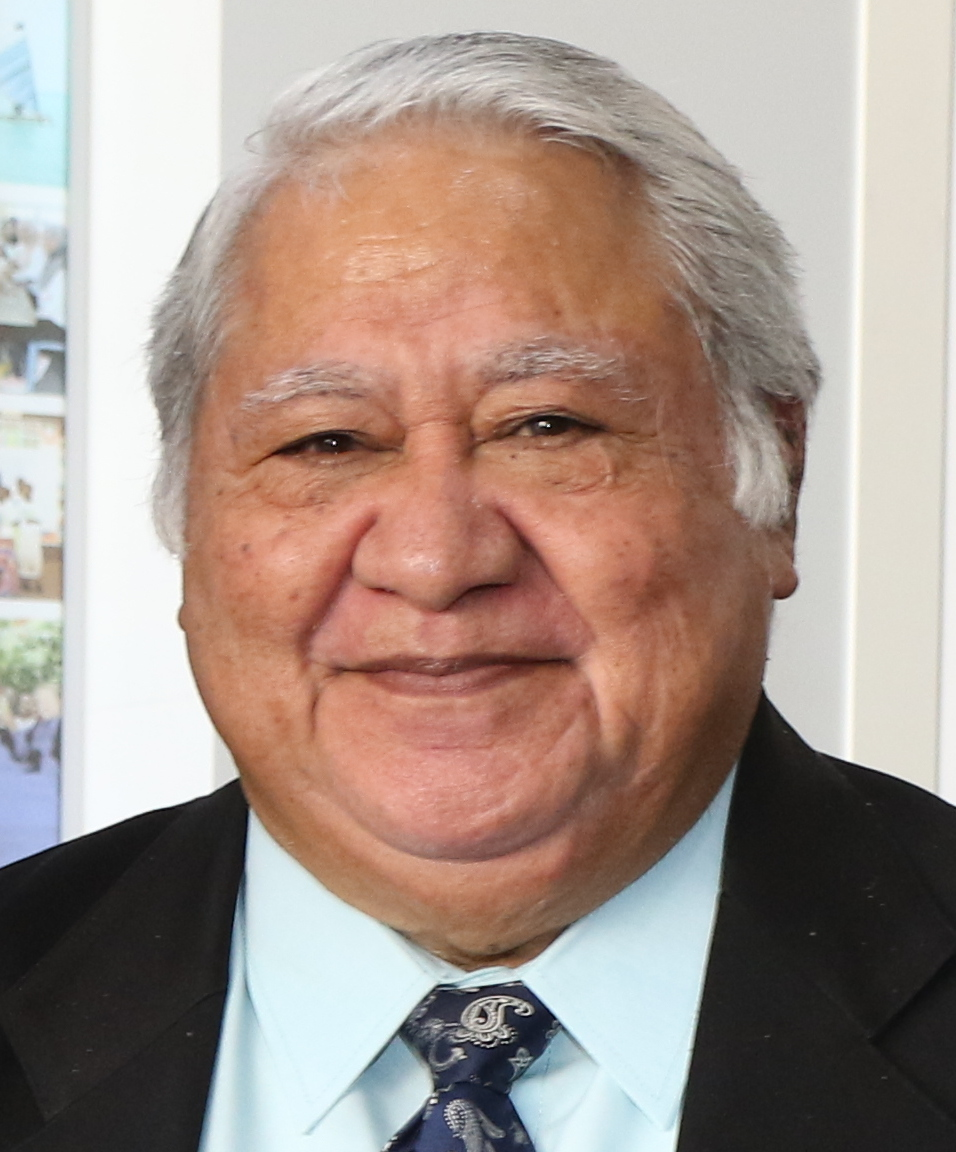

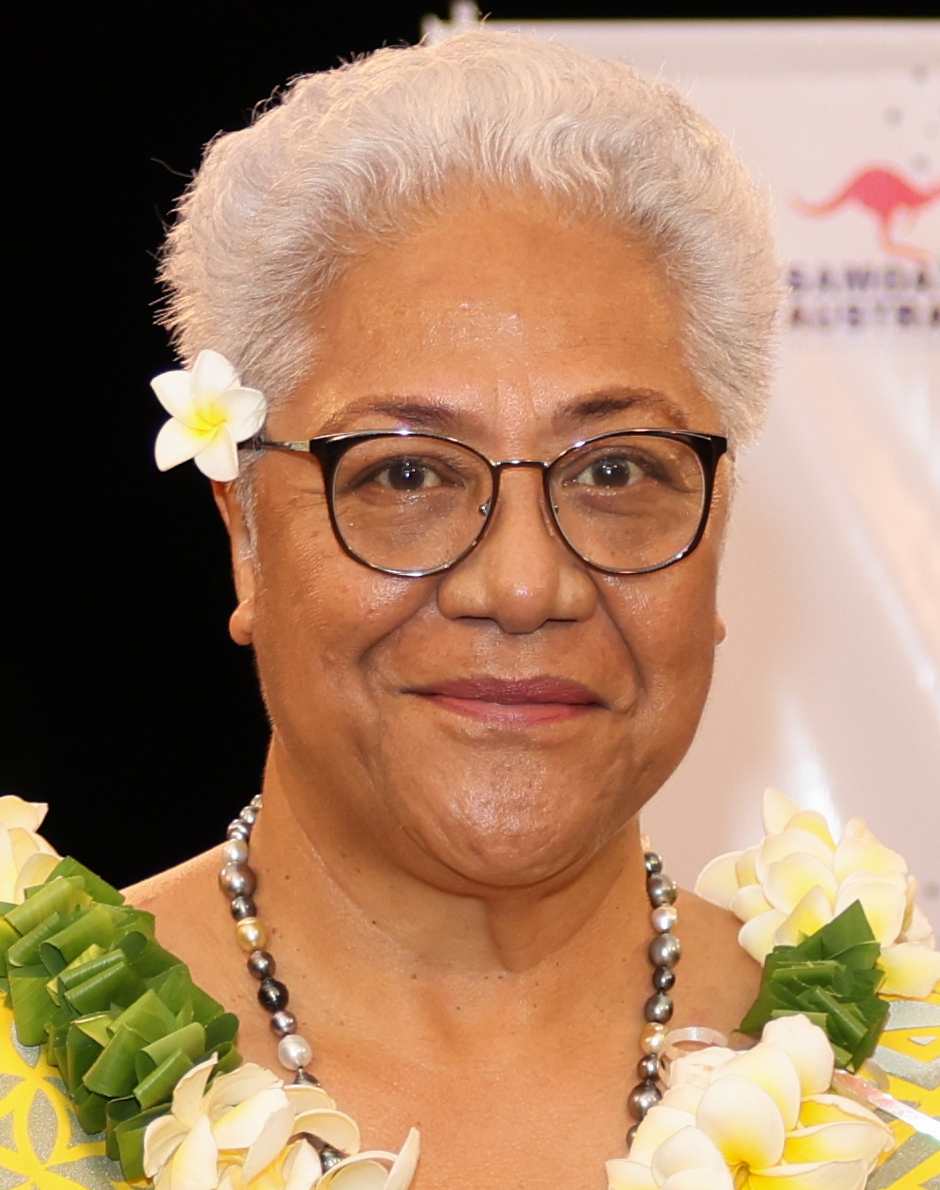
	First party	Second party
Leader	Tuilaʻepa Saʻilele Malielegaoi	Fiamē Naomi Mataʻafa
Party	HRPP	FAST
Last election	56.92%, 35 seats	New
Seats won	25	25
Seat change	▼10	New
Popular vote	49,237	32,510
Percentage	55.38%	36.57%
Swing	▼1.54pp	New
- Results by constituency
Prime Minister before election
Tuilaʻepa Saʻilele Malielegaoi
HRPP
Subsequent Prime Minister
Fiamē Naomi Mataʻafa
FAST

General elections were held in Samoa on 9 April 2021 to determine the composition of the 17th Parliament. The Human Rights Protection Party (HRPP), which had been in government for most of the time since 1982, was led into the election by Tuilaʻepa Saʻilele Malielegaoi, who had served as prime minister since 1998. The passage of the controversial Land and Titles bills by the HRPP led some party members to defect, establishing the Faʻatuatua i le Atua Samoa ua Tasi (FAST) party promising a repeal. FAST elected Fiamē Naomi Mataʻafa, the daughter of Samoa's first prime minister, as leader shortly before the election; she left the ruling party and resigned as deputy prime minister in 2020, also in opposition to the amendments.

The results produced a tie between the HRPP and FAST, winning 25 seats each, while one independent won a seat. Both parties subsequently negotiated with the kingmaker independent, Tuala Iosefo Ponifasio, who later joined FAST. However, during the negotiations, the electoral commissioner determined the results did not satisfy the 10% female parliamentary quota and announced the appointment of a sixth woman member of parliament, who was a member of the HRPP, leading to a deadlock with both parties holding 26 seats. To resolve the impasse, the O le Ao o le Malo (head of state), Tuimalealiʻifano Vaʻaletoʻa Sualauvi II, on the prime minister's advice, ordered a snap election. However, the Supreme Court later overturned both proclamations and instructed parliament to convene within 45 days of the election, as required by the constitution. Malielegaoi refused to accept the results, plunging the country into a prolonged political crisis.

On 24 May, the final day parliament could sit, FAST members arrived at a locked parliament surrounded by police. The O le Ao o le Malo and the HRPP caucus boycotted the sitting, prompting the FAST caucus to conduct an ad hoc ceremony in a tent outside of parliament, swearing in its members and a new government with Mataʻafa as prime minister. Malielegaoi denounced the ceremony as "illegal" and accused FAST of treason. After months of legal disputes, the Court of Appeal ruled on 23 July that the ad hoc ceremony was legally binding and that FAST had been the legitimate government since 24 May. The ruling confirmed Mataʻafa as Samoa's first female prime minister, ending nearly four decades of HRPP governance and Malielegaoi's premiership of 22 years.

Following the election and subsequent political crisis, electoral petition proceedings in court saw the HRPP lose seven seats, a reduction to 18, while FAST maintained its 26-seat majority.

== Background ==
The Human Rights Protection Party had dominated Samoan politics since 1982. The party's leader, Tuila‘epa Sa‘ilele Malielegaoi had served as prime minister since 1998 and around the time of this election was one of the longest-serving incumbent heads of government in the world. During the previous election held in 2016, the HRPP won a landslide re-election, winning 35 seats, including an extra seat established to fulfil the female parliamentary quota. The opposition Tautua Samoa Party (TSP) only won two seats down from 13 in the 2011 election, and the party's leader Palusalue Faʻapo II lost his seat. Many of the Independent candidates were HRPP affiliates but were not permitted to run as members of the ruling party as they were challenging HRPP incumbents. Therefore, following the election, of the 13 successful independents, 12 joined the HRPP giving the party a two-thirds majority of 47 seats. One independent joined the TSP, increasing its seat share to three. Still, because the TSP failed to win at least eight seats, it lost recognition as a parliamentary party which left Samoa without an official opposition. Fa‘apo II ceased to be the TSP leader after his loss, and the party did not select a replacement.

In December 2020, parliament passed three Land and Titles bills, a reform of the judicial system that would grant the land and titles court greater autonomy and would no longer be accountable to the Supreme Court and the Court of Appeals. The bills sparked criticism from the Samoa Law Society, highlighting the lack of public consultation and a bypass of the due parliamentary process. The Supreme Court justices released a statement of condemnation, arguing the bills would undermine the rule of law. One member of parliament, Laʻauli Leuatea Schmidt, was expelled from the HRPP for his opposition to the bills, and went on to establish the Fa‘atuatua i le Atua Samoa ua Tasi (FAST) party. Schmidt's seat was later controversially declared vacant, but he retained it after successfully contesting a subsequent by-election in August 2020. Two other MPs of the ruling party later joined FAST, including Fiamē Naomi Mata‘afa, the daughter of Samoa's first prime minister Fiamē Mataʻafa Faumuina Mulinuʻu II, who resigned as deputy prime minister, and in March 2021, was elected by FAST to lead the party. Weeks before the election, the HRPP majority passed a bill requiring members of parliament to contest a by-election if they leave their party to become independents during the parliamentary term. Ale Vena Ale, a former member of the HRPP, later claimed the following year that the motive behind this law's passage was to prevent further defections from the party. Several TSP members also defected to FAST, including former leader Fa‘apo II and other former TSP members of parliament.

== Electoral system ==
The 2021 election saw 51 members of parliament elected from single-member constituencies via first-past-the-post voting. Parliament approved amendments to the electoral act in 2019, which resulted in the constituencies being redrawn and increased to 51. These amendments also abolished the urban seat constituencies, which were designated for citizens in Apia who either resided on non-customary or had no connection to a traditional village. The 2013 Constitutional Amendment act mandates that at least 10% of members of parliament are women. If this quota were unfulfilled following an election, parliament must establish up to six additional seats allocated to the unsuccessful female candidates who attained the highest percentage of votes. Candidates were required to hold a matai title, have reached the age of 21 and have resided in Samoa for at least three years before the nomination deadline. Individuals convicted of a crime in Samoa or any other country within the previous eight years and people with a mental illness were ineligible to stand as candidates. Civil servants were permitted to run as long as they resigned. Should civil servants fail to do so, the date of filing their candidacy is by law deemed to be the point when they relinquish their role.

=== Voters ===
Universal suffrage came into effect in 1991, permitting all Samoan citizens aged 21 and older the right to vote. The passage of amendments to the electoral act in 2019 included the introduction of compulsory voting. Individuals who fail to cast a vote are required to pay a fine unless they provide a sufficient reason; in previous elections, voting was voluntary, but it was mandatory for eligible individuals to register. Pre-polling was open to individuals not present in Samoa on election day, people with disabilities and voters aged 65 and older. The 2019 electoral act also abolished special voting booths designated for voters enrolled in Savai‘i constituencies but residing in Apia, resulting in these individuals having to travel to their constituencies to vote. Although Samoan citizens residing abroad were allowed to register, the HRPP government refused to entertain overseas voting, as in the 2016 election. Which meant Samoans abroad had to travel to Samoa to vote. Prime Minister Malielegaoi claimed overseas voting would be vulnerable to irregularities. The decision sparked criticism from individuals like Tui Ātua Tupua Tamasese Efi, a former head of state and prime minister. He argued that because remittances from overseas Samoans contribute significantly to the economy, citizens abroad should be permitted to vote from afar. The former head of state believed the government's refusal to entertain overseas ballots was politically motivated.

== Schedule ==
The government revealed the election date in April 2020. Voter registration closed on 8 October 2020, while the nomination period for candidates to register their candidacy occurred from 13 to 20 October. The dissolution of the 16th Parliament took place on 3 March 2021, and the O le Ao o le Malo, Tuimalealiʻifano Vaʻaletoʻa Sualauvi II, issued the writ for the election soon after on 9 March. Early voting occurred in the days leading up to the election from 5 to 8 April, and the official results were released on 16 April.

Date	Event
8 October 2020	Voter registration closes
13 October 2020	Candidate nominations open
20 October 2020	Candidate nominations close
3 March 2021	The 16th Parliament is dissolved
9 March 2021	The O le Ao o le Malo issues the Writ for the Election
5 April 2021	Early voting commences
8 April 2021	Early voting concludes
9 April 2021	Election day
16 April 2021	Official results are released

== Parties and candidates ==
In addition to FAST, four other new parties registered with the Electoral Commission before the election, the Samoa First Party, led by Unasa Iuni Sapolu, the Sovereign Independent Samoa Party (SIS), led by Fesola‘i Logomalieimatagi Tepa Toloa; the Samoa National Democratic Party (SNDP) and Tumua ma Puleono. In September 2020, the SNDP and Tumua ma Puleono allied with FAST to challenge the HRPP. Under this agreement, the SNDP and Tumua members would compete as FAST candidates, but the parties would not compete against one another in the same constituencies. The parties would also remain separate entities. The Tautua Samoa Party meanwhile rejected a similar offer from FAST; party President Afualo Wood Salele said the TSP was not established to enter coalitions and expressed confidence in his party's electoral chances. The TSP instead opted to form an informal partnership with the Samoa First and SIS parties in November 2020, in which the parties would support one another's candidates in constituencies where none of their members was contesting.

Initially, 200 candidates were registered to contest the election; however, following court challenges and withdrawals, the candidate total decreased to 189. There were 21 female contenders, down from 24 in 2016. The ruling HRPP fielded 105 candidates. Party leader and prime minister, Tuila‘epa Sa‘ilele Malielegaoi, confirmed in July 2020 that he would seek a record fifth term as head of government. The HRPP continued its strategy of fielding multiple candidates in constituencies, which included official party members and unofficial affiliates. This strategy benefited the party in previous elections, allowing constituents to vote out HRPP MPs whose favourability had declined without causing the party to lose seats and ultimately helped it to retain majorities. FAST nominated 52 candidates; the TSP fielded 14, five Samoa First members qualified and the SIS party had one. Twelve candidates were independents.

Party	Leader	Candidates	Founded	2016 seats
Human Rights Protection Party	Tuilaʻepa Saʻilele Malielegaoi	105	1979	35 / 50
Tautua Samoa Party	Afualo Wood Salele (Note: Party president)	14	2008	2 / 50
Faʻatuatua i le Atua Samoa ua Tasi	Fiamē Naomi Mataʻafa	52	2020	Not yet founded
Samoa First Party	Unasa Iuni Sapolu	5	2018	Not yet founded
Sovereign Independent Samoa Party	Fesolaʻi Logomalieimatagi Tepa Toloa	1	2020	Not yet founded
Independents	—N/a	12	—N/a	13 / 50

== Campaign ==
=== Fa‘atuatua i le Atua Samoa ua Tasi ===
The FAST party's establishment was in response to the passage of the controversial Land and Titles bills, which it promised to repeal. The party released several other policy proposals upon its foundation in July 2020, including a two-term limit for the office of prime minister to avoid an "abuse of power" and eliminate "entrenched corruption". FAST embarked on a nationwide roadshow in January 2021. The party held public consultations with constituents, presenting existing proposals while receiving feedback on what issues to include in a manifesto. Prime Minister Malielegaoi denounced the roadshow as a "foreign practice" and encouraged HRPP supporters to gatecrash FAST events to counter "brainwashing". FAST aligned MPs were frequently absent from parliamentary sessions during its final sitting, resulting in the deputy speaker pledging to discipline them. The day before the 16th Parliament's dissolution, the prime minister ordered a commission of inquiry to investigate the MPs' absences and unspecified "treasonous acts" related to campaign speeches. The roadshow concluded on 18 March, and the party released a manifesto on 27 March, with a significant emphasis on governance and the rule of law. In addition to its proposals announced in 2020, other campaign issues the party focused on included the country's dependence on foreign aid and the national debt - the party pledged to review several Chinese government-funded development projects approved by the HRPP, especially plans for a multi-million tālā wharf in Savai‘i, out of concern for a debt increase. FAST promised an annual million tālā development grant for each constituency. The party also promised to allow overseas voting, highlighting the Samoan diaspora's significant economic contributions. FAST acquired considerable support from the diaspora, which raised over a million tālā for the party. The party won the endorsement of the former head of state Tui Ātua Tupua Tamasese Efi. Fiamē Naomi Mata‘afa's entry into FAST boosted appeal for the party, partly due to her chiefly and political lineage.

=== Human Rights Protection Party ===
The HRPP began campaigning three weeks before the election and launched a manifesto on 19 March. However, some observers said the party lacked a clear campaign strategy which had been the case for the past few election cycles; instead, relying on the personality-based nature of Samoan politics. The HRPP highlighted its record on issues such as healthcare, human development and education and also focused on infrastructure. The HRPP frequently mentioned planned infrastructure projects while campaigning, such as a new multi-million tālā wharf in Vaiusu and plans to construct a new hospital in Saleleloga, the latter of which was welcomed by many in Savaiʻi. The establishment of standalone ministries of culture and environment was also in the party's platform; the HRPP advocated for investing in electric vehicles and pointed to its efforts in providing remote communities off the electricity grid with solar power. Prime Minister Malielegaoi warned voters not to make the "wrong choice", claiming his government's achievements would otherwise be "destroyed within months". The HRPP faced more hurdles than in previous elections; an alleged mishandling of the 2019 measles epidemic damaged the party's standing amongst many members of the public. The controversial Land and Titles bills and a struggling economy due to the COVID-19 pandemic also reduced support. However, due to the HRPP's decades-long governance, many voters were sure the party would win re-election. Despite asking HRPP supporters to combat "brainwashing" by gatecrashing FAST roadshow events and stating that FAST were "better liars than satan", the prime minister expressed that he was unfazed about the opposition parties' chances and remained confident that the HRPP would prevail and win 45 seats.

=== Tautua Samoa Party ===
The TSP launched a manifesto in September 2020 with a theme of "justice and prosperity for all". Party President Afualo Wood Salele identified the four pillars of the party's vision, equal opportunity for all, the rule of law, equal distribution of wealth and environmental sustainability. The manifesto included plans to establish a university in Saleleloga to cater for Savaiʻi and create an education fund for students from the age of nine to the University level. The party also intended to form a commission of inquiry to investigate the 2019 measles epidemic and assign more qualified doctors to district hospitals to prevent future outbreaks. The TSP sought to increase the minimum wage and the elderly pension and end taxation for church ministers. The party advocated for creating an anti-corruption tribunal. Like FAST, the TSP favoured implementing term limits for the prime minister, repealing the Land and Titles bills and permitting overseas voting. The TSP initially aimed to begin campaigning in November 2020, but as several TSP hopefuls faced legal challenges to their candidacies, the party delayed campaigning to January 2021. After the TSP allied with the Sovereign Independent Samoa and Samoa First parties, the trio released a joint manifesto in late January 2021.

== Conduct ==
Several voters complained to the Office of the Electoral Commission (OEC), claiming to have been pressured by village councils to vote for certain candidates. The electoral commissioner responded on 28 February, warning the councils not to meddle with the electoral process and telling them to respect the will of the voters.

Pre-polling commenced on 5 April; 7,414 voters cast an early vote, according to the OEC, out of over 8000 who were eligible to do so. When pre-polling concluded the day before the election on 8 April, the HRPP led in 27 constituencies, FAST in 20 and the TSP in one. An alcohol ban was in force from 7 April to the day after the election. On Election Day, polling stations opened at 8:00 and closed at 15:00 (UTC+13). Voters resident in Apia and other parts of Upolu but enrolled in constituencies in Savai‘i travelled to their registered constituencies in droves, which resulted in the ferry service operating between Upolu and Savai‘i being busier than usual. Many of these voters found the journey costly due to the travel fares, accommodation costs and presenting gifts to their relatives residing on Savai‘i in adherence to Samoan customs. Some of these individuals opted instead to abstain from voting and pay a fine, which they viewed as more financially viable than travelling to Savai‘i. Polling officials detected a counting glitch in the Vaimauga 2 constituency, which had incorrectly showed the TSP candidate leading two HRPP contestants. In the official count, the OEC found 39 instances of double voting in the constituency of Sagaga 2 and referred the matter to the police.

== Results ==
The OEC released the official results on 16 April. The HRPP lost its majority and was locked in a tie with FAST; both parties won 25 seats. Four of the victorious FAST candidates were affiliates of the SNDP. One independent candidate won a seat, Tuala Iosefo Ponifasio, who became the kingmaker. Three candidates won their seats uncontested; one was FAST Leader Fiamē Naomi Mataʻafa, and the other two were HRPP members; Prime Minister Tuilaʻepa Saʻilele Malielegaoi and Lealaʻilepule Rimoni Aiafi. Five of the successful candidates were women, with the female quota seemingly fulfilled. Four cabinet ministers, including Finance Minister Sili Epa Tuioti, lost their seats. FAST won 15 of the 20 constituencies on Savai‘i. The presence of multiple HRPP candidates contesting constituencies led to vote-splitting in numerous cases, allowing many FAST candidates to win by plurality. The HRPP won the popular vote by nearly 20 points, receiving over 55% to FAST's 36%, partly due to the HRPP fielding a disproportionately higher number of candidates than all other parties. The TSP failed to win any seats, although Party President Afualo Wood Salele came close, losing to his FAST opponent by eight votes.

Party	Votes	%	Seats	+/–
Human Rights Protection Party	49,237	55.38	25	−10
Faʻatuatua i le Atua Samoa ua Tasi	32,510	36.57	25	New
Tautua Samoa Party	2,900	3.26	0	−2
Samoa First Party	207	0.23	0	New
Sovereign Independent Samoa Party	30	0.03	0	New
Independents	4,025	4.53	1	−12
Total	88,909	100.00	51	+1
Valid votes	88,909	99.32		
Invalid/blank votes	605	0.68		
Total votes	89,514	100.00		
Registered voters/turnout	128,848	69.47		
Source: Office of the Electoral Commission, Government of Samoa

=== By constituency ===
Constituency	Turnout	Political party	Candidate	Votes	%
Aʻana Alofi 1	1,844	FAST	Fesolai Apulu Tuigamala	938	50.9
Aʻana Alofi 1	1,844	HRPP	Taueva Faʻafouina Sauvao	589	31.9
Aʻana Alofi 1	1,844	Independent	Fesolai Aleni Sofara	287	15.6
Aʻana Alofi 1	1,844	SIS	Fesolai Logo Tepa Toloa	30	1.6
Aʻana Alofi 2	1,267	HRPP	Aiono Afaese Toleafoa	520	41.0
Aʻana Alofi 2	1,267	FAST	Lolomatauama Eseta Mataituli	292	23.0
Aʻana Alofi 2	1,267	HRPP	Apenamoemanatunatu Tuʻuau Letaulau	212	16.7
Aʻana Alofi 2	1,267	HRPP	Aiono Tile Gafa	173	13.7
Aʻana Alofi 2	1,267	TSP	Faletulutulu Ameti Faletutulu	70	5.5
Aʻana Alofi 3	1,624	FAST	Agaseata Valelio Tanuvasa	700	43.1
Aʻana Alofi 3	1,624	Independent	Ili Setefano Taʻateo	575	35.4
Aʻana Alofi 3	1,624	HRPP	Niuapu Faaui II Leiataualesa	289	17.8
Aʻana Alofi 3	1,624	Independent	Agaseata Neemia Auvaʻa	60	3.7
Aʻana Alofi 4	2,032	FAST	Toeolesulusulu Cedric Schuster	845	41.6
Aʻana Alofi 4	2,032	HRPP	Afamasaga Rico Tupai	637	31.3
Aʻana Alofi 4	2,032	HRPP	Toleafoa Pili Afamasaga Asiata	361	17.8
Aʻana Alofi 4	2,032	Independent	Taufono Liolevave Ifi Saipini	150	7.4
Aʻana Alofi 4	2,032	TSP	Tamanana Afamasaga Uelese Tasolo	39	1.9
Aiga-i-le-Tai	3,434	FAST	Auapaʻau Mulipola Aloitafua	1,343	39.1
Aiga-i-le-Tai	3,434	HRPP	Leiataualesā Taupau Mulipola Oliva	831	24.2
Aiga-i-le-Tai	3,434	HRPP	Ifopo Matia Filisi Jahnke	727	21.2
Aiga-i-le-Tai	3,434	HRPP	Mulipola Atonio Patua Mulipola	328	9.6
Aiga-i-le-Tai	3,434	HRPP	Pouli Taialofa Naseri	205	6.0
Alataua West	1,159	FAST	Seuʻula Ioane	695	60.0
Alataua West	1,159	HRPP	Aliʻimalemanu Alofa Tuuau	464	40.0
Aleipata Itupa-i-Lalo	1,967	HRPP	Fiugalu Eteuati Eteuati	805	40.9
Aleipata Itupa-i-Lalo	1,967	HRPP	Tafua Maluelue Tafua	777	39.5
Aleipata Itupa-i-Lalo	1,967	FAST	Tauiliʻili Kolose Fruean	206	10.5
Aleipata Itupa-i-Lalo	1,967	TSP	Sua Samuelu Sua	179	9.1
Aleiptata Itupa-i-Luga	1,266	HRPP	Fuaava Suluimalo Amataga	536	42.3
Aleiptata Itupa-i-Luga	1,266	HRPP	Taua Edmund Taufua	450	35.5
Aleiptata Itupa-i-Luga	1,266	HRPP	Fagaʻaivalu Kendrick Samu	280	22.1
Anoamaʻa 1	2,310	HRPP	Alaiasa Sepulona Moananu	1,045	45.2
Anoamaʻa 1	2,310	HRPP	Tialavea Tionisio Hunt	948	41.0
Anoamaʻa 1	2,310	FAST	Leuluama Vaʻai Faʻaeʻe	177	7.7
Anoamaʻa 1	2,310	FAST	Limutau Menefata F. T. A. Fonoti	77	3.3
Anoamaʻa 1	2,310	Samoa First	Upuolevavau Agnes Susi	63	2.7
Anoamaʻa 2	2,200	HRPP	Fonotoe Pierre Lauofo	1,121	51.0
Anoamaʻa 2	2,200	FAST	Toʻomata Norah Leota	780	35.5
Anoamaʻa 2	2,200	Independent	Taiata Sulutumu Sasa Milo	276	12.5
Anoamaʻa 2	2,200	HRPP	Toʻomata Sunu Maea Leota	16	0.7
Anoamaʻa 2	2,200	Samoa First	Leuluaialiʻi Joseph Fonoti Brown	7	0.3
Faʻasaleleʻaga 1	1,862	FAST	Matamua Vasati Pulufana	1,173	63.0
Faʻasaleleʻaga 1	1,862	HRPP	Sili Epa Tuioti	689	37.0
Faʻasaleleʻaga 2	1,669	FAST	Magele Sekati Fiaui	649	38.9
Faʻasaleleʻaga 2	1,669	HRPP	Gatoloaifaana Amataga Alesana-Gidlow	555	33.3
Faʻasaleleʻaga 2	1,669	HRPP	Talalafai Toma Amosa	197	11.8
Faʻasaleleʻaga 2	1,669	HRPP	Oloapu Ka Iese	139	8.3
Faʻasaleleʻaga 2	1,669	TSP	Sua Vivian Betham Leota-Suatele	129	7.7
Faʻasaleleʻaga 3	2,530	FAST	Papaliʻi Liʻo Taeu Masipau	1,341	53.0
Faʻasaleleʻaga 3	2,530	HRPP	Namulauʻulu Sami Leota	1,124	44.4
Faʻasaleleʻaga 3	2,530	FAST	Liʻomatua Ainuu Siaosi Salaʻa	65	2.6
Faʻasaleleʻaga 4	1,567	FAST	Tea Tooala Peato	827	52.8
Faʻasaleleʻaga 4	1,567	HRPP	Tofa Foleni Lio	269	17.2
Faʻasaleleʻaga 4	1,567	Independent	Toʻoala Fetauai Unasa Tiatia	188	12.0
Faʻasaleleʻaga 4	1,567	FAST	Unasa Viane F. Toala	169	10.8
Faʻasaleleʻaga 4	1,567	HRPP	Unasa Tauheia Levaʻai	114	7.3
Faʻasaleleʻaga 5	1,213	HRPP	Peseta Vaifou Tevaga	463	38.2
Faʻasaleleʻaga 5	1,213	HRPP	Matafeo Seinafolava Reupena Matafeo	383	31.6
Faʻasaleleʻaga 5	1,213	HRPP	Vui Seinafolava Laniselota Lameko	367	30.3
Falealili 1	2,091	FAST	Toelupe Poumulinuku Onesemo	1,161	55.5
Falealili 1	2,091	HRPP	Aumua Siʻiliʻili Isaia Lameko	461	22.0
Falealili 1	2,091	HRPP	Tupuola Misa Tupuola	173	8.3
Falealili 1	2,091	HRPP	Teo Uuvalu Mauga	160	7.7
Falealili 1	2,091	HRPP	Lupeomanu Pelenato Fonoti	74	3.5
Falealili 1	2,091	TSP	Pinofoaga Poaneki Epati	62	3.0
Falealili 2	1,229	HRPP	Fuimaono Teo Samuelu	513	41.7
Falealili 2	1,229	FAST	Maiava Fuimaono Viʻiga Fuimaono	375	30.5
Falealili 2	1,229	FAST	Veletaloola Fuimaono Lotomua Avauli	294	23.9
Falealili 2	1,229	HRPP	Fonoti Samagapea Namulauʻulu	47	3.8
Falealupo	867	HRPP	Leota Tima Leavai	467	53.9
Falealupo	867	FAST	Fuiono Tenina Crichton	347	40.0
Falealupo	867	HRPP	Solia Iosefo Kalolo	53	6.1
Faleata 1	3,697	FAST	Manuleleua Paletasala Tovale	1,207	32.6
Faleata 1	3,697	HRPP	Salausa John Ah Ching	1,181	31.9
Faleata 1	3,697	HRPP	Leapai Richard S. Brown	1,013	27.4
Faleata 1	3,697	HRPP	Manuleleua Ioane K. Manuleleua	220	6.0
Faleata 1	3,697	HRPP	Lepou Petelo II	76	2.0
Faleata 2	3,408	FAST	Leatinuʻu Wayne Soʻoialo	2,251	66.1
Faleata 2	3,408	HRPP	Ulugia Elon Betham	968	28.4
Faleata 2	3,408	HRPP	Ulugia Matau Matafeo Siatiu	189	5.5
Faleata 4	1,626	HRPP	Ale Vena Ale	877	53.9
Faleata 4	1,626	HRPP	Ulu Bismarck Fuluasou Crawley	592	36.4
Faleata 4	1,626	TSP	Lealasopo Leuiʻi Vaitagutu	157	9.7
Falelatai and Samatau	2,205	HRPP	Lupematasila Tologata Tile Leia	1,008	45.7
Falelatai and Samatau	2,205	FAST	Pau Roy Ausage	851	38.6
Falelatai and Samatau	2,205	HRPP	Taefu Lemi Taefu	346	15.7
Gagaʻemauga 1	1,274	Independent	Tuala Iosefo Ponifasio	644	50.5
Gagaʻemauga 1	1,274	HRPP	Laupou Alofipo Faʻamanu Manase	337	26.5
Gagaʻemauga 1	1,274	FAST	Vaaaoao Salumalo Alofipo	293	23.0
Gagaʻemauga 2	1,527	FAST	Seuamuli Fasi Toma	794	52.0
Gagaʻemauga 2	1,527	HRPP	Nafoitoa Mataia Valu Keti	733	48.0
Gagaʻifomauga 1	1,100	HRPP	Faimalotoa Kika Stowers	493	44.8
Gagaʻifomauga 1	1,100	HRPP	Timu Iakopo Timu	251	22.8
Gagaʻifomauga 1	1,100	TSP	Lavea Peseta Lua Nafoi	191	17.4
Gagaʻifomauga 1	1,100	FAST	Uuga Venasio I. Fidow	165	15.0
Gagaʻifomauga 2	1,440	FAST	Vaʻele Paʻiaʻaua Iona Sekuini	596	41.4
Gagaʻifomauga 2	1,440	HRPP	Soʻoalo Umi Feo Mene	444	30.8
Gagaʻifomauga 2	1,440	HRPP	Peauala Titi Lamese	259	18.8
Gagaʻifomauga 2	1,440	HRPP	Lepailetai Ieti T. Ngg Cho	114	7.9
Gagaʻifomauga 2	1,440	HRPP	Manuta Lavamaile Uesilē	27	1.9
Gagaʻifomauga 3	1,069	FAST	Laʻauli Leuatea Schmidt	826	77.3
Gagaʻifomauga 3	1,069	HRPP	Faʻaulusau Rosa Levea	243	22.7
Lefaga and Faleaseʻela	2,564	FAST	Masinalupe Makesi Masinalupe	910	35.5
Lefaga and Faleaseʻela	2,564	HRPP	Sua Tanielu Sua	713	27.8
Lefaga and Faleaseʻela	2,564	HRPP	Fui Leapai Asofou Soʻo	455	17.7
Lefaga and Faleaseʻela	2,564	HRPP	Lemalu Enokati Posala Lemalu	384	15.0
Lefaga and Faleaseʻela	2,564	HRPP	Lemalu Lemamea Mathew Mualia	102	4.0
Palauli 1	1,958	FAST	Mulipola Anarosa Ale Molioʻo	712	36.4
Palauli 1	1,958	TSP	Tupai Avala Savaiʻinaea	460	23.5
Palauli 1	1,958	Independent	Leotamanusala Lene Mulipola Samuelu	439	22.4
Palauli 1	1,958	HRPP	Agafili Patisela Eteuati Tolovaʻa	173	8.8
Palauli 1	1,958	HRPP	Afoa Amituanai Faleulu Mauli	112	5.7
Palauli 1	1,958	HRPP	Toilolo Pisa Talofa Gase	45	2.3
Palauli 1	1,958	Samoa First	Lealofi Vagavao Lealofi	17	0.9
Palauli 2	1,811	FAST	Leota Laki Lamositele	767	42.4
Palauli 2	1,811	FAST	Tiatia Laulu Mapusua	758	41.9
Palauli 2	1,811	HRPP	Faumuina Tiatia Liuga	286	15.8
Palauli 3	1,736	FAST	Lagaʻaia Tiatuau Tufuga	599	34.5
Palauli 3	1,736	HRPP	Aiolupotea Toni Leleisiuao	367	21.1
Palauli 3	1,736	HRPP	Tuifaʻasisina Misa Lisati	331	19.1
Palauli 3	1,736	HRPP	Tafili Pesamino Niupuluau Leo	291	16.8
Palauli 3	1,736	FAST	Mataʻafa Fonofaʻavae Mataʻafa	86	5.0
Palauli 3	1,736	HRPP	Laulu Ianeta Chan Tung	33	1.9
Palauli 3	1,736	TSP	Fiso Taranaki Mailei	29	1.7
Safata 1	2,261	HRPP	Leaʻana Ronnie Posini	1,037	45.9
Safata 1	2,261	FAST	Afemata Palusalue Faʻapo II	751	33.2
Safata 1	2,261	HRPP	Tafafunai Aialiʻi Anapu	473	20.9
Safata 2	1,804	HRPP	Nonu Lose Niumata	578	32.0
Safata 2	1,804	FAST	Laumatiamanu Ringo Purcell	466	25.8
Safata 2	1,804	HRPP	Teo Faitele Afamasaga	382	21.1
Safata 2	1,804	HRPP	Feata Toleafoa Vaʻatausili	184	10.2
Safata 2	1,804	TSP	Leota-Suatele Manusegi Tufele	145	8.0
Safata 2	1,804	HRPP	Tupai Tuʻugamusu Vaimagalo Afioga	49	2.7
Sagaga 1	1,698	HRPP	Loau Keneti Sio	1,010	59.5
Sagaga 1	1,698	FAST	Papaliʻi Tavita Moala	688	40.5
Sagaga 2	2,647	HRPP	Seiuli Ueligitone Seiuli	699	26.4
Sagaga 2	2,647	Independent	Maualaivao Patelesio Ah Him	547	20.7
Sagaga 2	2,647	Independent	Maulolo Tavita Amosa	527	19.9
Sagaga 2	2,647	FAST	Fata Meafou	499	18.9
Sagaga 2	2,647	HRPP	Lio Ioapo Ioapo	164	6.2
Sagaga 2	2,647	FAST	Faʻalogo Ivin Chan K. Tong	157	5.9
Sagaga 2	2,647	Samoa First	Vaotuʻua Michael Faletua Toevai	54	2.0
Sagaga 3	2,097	HRPP	Sala Fata Pinati	897	42.8
Sagaga 3	2,097	FAST	Sala Vaimili II Uili	605	28.9
Sagaga 3	2,097	HRPP	Tuala Olivetti Ah Him	595	28.4
Sagaga 4	2,314	HRPP	Tuisa Tasi Patea	851	36.8
Sagaga 4	2,314	FAST	Tagaloatele Poloa	579	25.0
Sagaga 4	2,314	HRPP	Liutagata Poe Elama	479	20.7
Sagaga 4	2,314	FAST	Tulimasealiʻi Samasoni Pomare	405	17.5
Salega 1	1,192	FAST	Fepuleai Faʻasavalu Faimata Suʻa	381	32.0
Salega 1	1,192	HRPP	Toʻomata Aki Tuipea	375	31.5
Salega 1	1,192	TSP	Afualo Wood Salele	373	31.3
Salega 1	1,192	Independent	Leumuava Asalemo Tuimauga	63	5.3
Salega 2	865	FAST	Olo Fiti Vaai	393	45.4
Salega 2	865	HRPP	Tupuai Faʻalogo Tupai Pesa Veʻe	362	41.8
Salega 2	865	HRPP	Maeʻe Ualesi Falefa Silva	98	11.3
Salega 2	865	TSP	Tupuai Etuale Vui Fala	12	1.4
Satupaʻitea	965	HRPP	Lautafi Fio Selafi Purcell	514	53.3
Satupaʻitea	965	HRPP	Tavui Asiata Tiafau Tafu Salevao	451	46.7
Siʻumu	1,521	HRPP	Tuʻuʻu Anasiʻi Leota	633	41.6
Siʻumu	1,521	HRPP	Tuʻuʻu Amaramo Sialaoa Pagamaile	391	25.7
Siʻumu	1,521	FAST	Atuatasi Katifa Tuuʻu Bryce	244	16.0
Siʻumu	1,521	HRPP	Faʻalogo Iosefo Sopi	134	8.8
Siʻumu	1,521	HRPP	Mano Ioelu	119	7.8
Vaʻa-o-Fonoti	1,179	HRPP	Mauʻu Siaosi Puʻepuʻemai	751	63.7
Vaʻa-o-Fonoti	1,179	Independent	Fauoo Fatu Tielu	269	22.8
Vaʻa-o-Fonoti	1,179	FAST	Logo Pelenatino Lavataʻi	71	6.0
Vaʻa-o-Fonoti	1,179	HRPP	Valaʻau Togia Maʻalaelu	63	5.3
Vaʻa-o-Fonoti	1,179	HRPP	Taumainamoe Aufui Tuimalatu	25	2.1
Vaimauga 1	2,889	HRPP	Sulamanaia Tauiliili Tuivasa	1,349	46.7
Vaimauga 1	2,889	HRPP	Fuatimau Maumea Leniu	991	34.3
Vaimauga 1	2,889	HRPP	Tuisugaletaua Maposua Sofara Aveau	549	19.0
Vaimauga 2	2,065	HRPP	Lenatai Victor Tamapua	1,032	50.0
Vaimauga 2	2,065	TSP	Tamaleta Taimung Jensen	846	41.0
Vaimauga 2	2,065	HRPP	Tofaeono Iupati Fuatai	187	9.1
Vaimauga 3	3,241	HRPP	Tapunuu Niko Lee Hang	1,657	51.1
Vaimauga 3	3,241	FAST	Veatauia Faʻatasi Puleiata	1,518	46.8
Vaimauga 3	3,241	Samoa First	Feagaimaliʻi Bruce Utaileuo	66	2.0
Vaimauga 4	2,113	FAST	Lefau Harry Schuster	1,061	50.2
Vaimauga 4	2,113	HRPP	Faʻaolesa Katopau Ainuʻu	709	33.6
Vaimauga 4	2,113	TSP	Vaea Ivana Eli	208	9.8
Vaimauga 4	2,113	HRPP	Maugaoaliʻi Faʻamanu Ropati Mualia	135	6.4
Vaisigano 1	1,386	FAST	Niuava Eti Malolo	823	59.4
Vaisigano 1	1,386	HRPP	Lopaoʻo Natanielu Mua	541	39.0
Vaisigano 1	1,386	HRPP	Tuiasau Uelese Petaia	22	1.6
Vaisigano 2	1,126	FAST	Valasi Toogamaga Tafito	600	53.3
Vaisigano 2	1,126	HRPP	Tapulesatele Mauteni Esera	526	46.7
Sources: Psephos, Government of Samoa

==== Uncontested ====
The following three candidates were elected unopposed:

Constituency	Candidate	Party
Faleata 3	Lealaʻilepule Rimoni Aiafi	HRPP
Lepā	Tuilaʻepa Saʻilele Malielegaoi	HRPP
Lotofaga	Fiamē Naomi Mataʻafa	FAST

== Aftermath ==
Following the election, the HRPP and FAST began negotiating with independent kingmaker Tuala Iosefo Ponifasio to form a government. Whilst the talks were ongoing, a dispute arose regarding the interpretation of the parliamentary women's quota. The OEC determined that the female quota was only 9.8% filled, and the electoral commissioner subsequently announced on 20 April the appointment of a sixth female MP, Aliʻimalemanu Alofa Tuuau of the HRPP. However, FAST claimed the presence of five female members fulfilled the quota and challenged the decision in court. The following day, Ponifasio announced his decision to join FAST, resulting in a hung parliament with both parties holding 26 seats. During this time, numerous candidates began filing electoral petitions against their opponents. The legislative assembly clerk, Tiatia Graeme Tualaulei, announced shortly after the election that parliament would not convene until the Supreme Court resolved all electoral petitions. By law, parliament must meet within 45 days of a general election.

=== Snap election attempt ===
In light of a hung parliament, the leaders of the HRPP and FAST met with the O le Ao o le Malo (head of state), Tuimalealiʻifano Vaʻaletoʻa Sualauvi II, on 4 May to discuss the possibility of a second election. While the HRPP supported the proposal, FAST rejected it and argued that all court cases and electoral petitions should be exhausted first. Mataʻafa said the O le Ao o le Malo had no power to call a fresh election under these circumstances and questioned why he would not wait for the Supreme Court justices to rule on the additional MP first. Later that day, acting on the prime minister's advice, the O le Ao o le Malo declared the results of the April election to be void and ordered a snap poll for 21 May, and issued the election writ the following day. FAST challenged the proclamation in court, arguing the call was "unconstitutional". Meanwhile, the TSP welcomed a second poll, claiming the April election was full of irregularities. On 17 May, the Supreme Court overturned the appointment of the sixth woman MP and the voiding of the April election, cancelling the scheduled May poll due to the lack of legal authority on the part of the O le Ao o le Malo. The court also ordered parliament to convene within 45 days of the April election. Prime Minister Malielegaoi refused to accept the results; he announced the HRPP would appeal both rulings and that his caretaker government would remain in power until the resolution of all electoral petitions in court.

=== Constitutional crisis ===
The O le Ao o le Malo initially agreed to abide by the ruling and scheduled parliament to convene on 24 May, the final day it could meet by law. On 22 May, Chief Justice Satiu Simativa Perese rejected an attempt by Attorney-General Savalenoa Mareva Betham Annandale to nullify the order for parliament to convene. That day, the O le Ao le Malo retracted his proclamation, adding that he would disclose the reasoning in "due course", triggering a constitutional crisis. The following day, the Supreme Court ruled the retraction unconstitutional and ordered the convention to proceed. Malielegaoi denounced the ruling as "illegal", called for the Supreme Court justices to stand trial and said the HRPP caucus would not be sworn in without the additional female MP. That evening, the outgoing speaker, Leaupepe Toleafoa Faafisi, defied the court order and cancelled the swearing-in ceremony. On 24 May, the FAST MPs arrived at Parliament for the swearing-in ceremony, only to find the legislative assembly building locked and surrounded by police. The HRPP MPs refused to attend, and when the O le Ao o le Malo did not appear, the FAST caucus conducted an ad hoc ceremony in a tent outside parliament, swearing in its members with former Attorney-General Taulapapa Brenda Heather-Latu acting as the clerk; Mataʻafa took the oath of office to become Samoa's first female prime minister and Ponifasio became deputy prime minister. Papaliʻi Liʻo Taeu Masipau was sworn in as speaker. Following the ceremony, Malielegaoi accused FAST of treason. Shortly after, the Federated States of Micronesia and Palau recognised the FAST government as legitimate.

The crisis ended on 23 July when the Court of Appeals ruled the ad hoc ceremony was legal and that FAST had been the legitimate government since 24 May. The justices also determined that the HRPP caretaker administration had unlawfully occupied government offices from that date. The order confirmed Mataʻafa's appointment as Samoa's first female prime minister and FAST's victory, ending nearly four decades of HRPP governance and Malielegaoi's premiership of over 22 years. After the ruling, Mataʻafa and FAST began to receive congratulatory messages from state leaders, with one of the first coming from New Zealand Prime Minister Jacinda Ardern. The O le Ao o le Malo recognised the new government shortly after. On 26 July, Malielegaoi conceded defeat, nearly three months after the election. The following day, he ceded power and assumed the role of opposition leader. In August 2021, Malielegaoi claimed that his party's defeat resulted from a "feminist plot" instigated by Ardern and suggested she wanted "a female prime minister for Samoa". Malielegaoi also alleged that the New Zealand government was significantly involved in the constitutional crisis; and cited Ardern's swift congratulations on the new prime minister as "proof". Ardern denied the allegations as unfounded.

=== Swearing in of the HRPP caucus ===
Mataʻafa set the first sitting of the 17th Parliament since the constitutional crisis for 14 September. The status of the HRPP MPs was in limbo as they had not been sworn in within 45 days of the general election, with uncertainty around whether or not they would need to compete in by-elections. Malielegaoi informed the speaker that the HRPP caucus wished only to be sworn in by the head of state and not him. The speaker responded by telling the HRPP leader that it is he that swears in members of parliament per the constitution. The day before the parliamentary sitting, the speaker barred the HRPP caucus from attending the convention of parliament and refusing to swear them in, citing a "continual opposition and non-acceptance of the current government". On the day, per the speaker's declaration, the police prevented the HRPP caucus from attempting to enter the parliamentary chamber. Malielegaoi accused FAST of being dictatorial, and described the event as a "sad day for Samoa"; the following day the HRPP filed a lawsuit. On 16 September, the Supreme Court ruled in the HRPP's favour, ordering the speaker to swear in the caucus as soon as possible, who did so the next day.

=== Electoral petitions and subsequent by-elections ===
Some unsuccessful candidates filed electoral petitions against their winning opponents, accusing them of malpractice. Twenty-eight candidates had petitions brought against them; fourteen were HRPP members, while the other fourteen were FAST MPs. The proceedings saw seven of the HRPP MPs either convicted and stripped of their seats by order of the court or resign to avoid prosecution. TSP President Salele submitted a petition against his victorious FAST opponent, which he later withdrew under pressure from his constituency. However, a subsequent counter-petition saw Salele convicted by the Supreme Court of bribery and barred from running in elections for ten years. On the other hand, none of the FAST MPs in question lost their seats, leaving Parliament with 26 FAST MPs and 18 for the HRPP.

To fill the vacancies, the speaker of parliament, Masipau, scheduled seven by-elections in the vacant constituencies for 26 November. FAST candidates won five of the seats, one of whom was unopposed, increasing the party's majority to 32. The HRPP could only retain two seats, leaving them with 20 members in parliament. Due to the HRPP's less than ideal performance, former Education Minister Loau Keneti Sio and other HRPP members called for Malielegaoi to resign as party leader. As no women won any seats in the by-election, the head of state appointed two additional female members to parliament. However, the speaker refused to swear them in until a dispute regarding the interpretation of the 10% quota was settled in court. The following year in May 2022, the Supreme Court ordered the speaker to swear in three additional members, Aliʻimalemanu Alofa Tuuau and Faagasealii Sapoa Feagiai of the HRPP and Toʻomata Norah Leota of FAST. The court of appeal voided the apportionment of the additional FAST member in November 2022.

== See also ==
- List of members of the Legislative Assembly of Samoa (2021–2025)
