= List of members of the Legislative Assembly of Samoa (2016–2021) =

Members of the Legislative Assembly of Samoa were elected on 4 March 2016. The 50 members consisted of 35 representatives of the Human Rights Protection Party, two from the Tautua Samoa Party and 13 independents. When Parliament convened, 47 members joined the Human Rights Protection Party faction and three sat as independents.

== Members ==
Name	Electorate	Party
Hon A'eau Peniamina	Falealupo	Tautua Samoa Party
Afamasaga Lepuiai Rico Tupai	Aana Alofi No. 3	Human Rights Protection Party
Afoa Amituanai Faleulu Mauli	Palauli Sisifo	Human Rights Protection Party
Alaiasa Sepulona Moananu	Anoamaa Sasae (East)	Human Rights Protection Party
Ali'imalemanu Alofa Tuuau	Alataua Sisifo (West)	Human Rights Protection Party
Amituanai Fagaivalu Kenrick Samu	Aleipata Itupa i Luga	Human Rights Protection Party
Hon Dr Tuilaepa Aiono Sailele Malielegaoi	Lepa	Human Rights Protection Party
Aumua Isaia Lameko	Falealili West	Human Rights Protection Party
Faalogo Iosefa Sopi	Siumu	Human Rights Protection Party
Faaolesa Katopau Ainuu	Vaimauga Sisifo No. 2	Human Rights Protection Party
Hon Faasootauloa Pati Taulapapa	Gagaemauga No. 2	Human Rights Protection Party
Fa'aulusau Rosa Duffy-Stowers	Gagaifomauga No. 3	Human Rights Protection Party
Faimalotoa Kika Iemaima Stowers	Gagaifomauga No. 1	Human Rights Protection Party
Faumuina Asi Pauli Wayne Fong	Urban West	Human Rights Protection Party
Hon Faumuina Tiatia Liuga	Palauli le Falefa	Human Rights Protection Party
Hon Fiame Naomi Mata'afa	Lotofaga	Human Rights Protection Party
Fuimaono Teo Samuelu	Falealili East	Human Rights Protection Party
Hon Gatoloaifaana Amataga Alesana-Gidlow	Faasaleleaga No. 1	Human Rights Protection Party
Ili Setefano Ta’ateo	Aana Alofi No. 2	Tautua Samoa Party
Hon Laauli Leuatea Polataivao	Gagaifomauga No. 3	Human Rights Protection Party
Hon Fonotoe Nuafesili Pierre Lauofo	Anoamaa Sisifo	Human Rights Protection Party
Hon Lautafi Fio Selafi Purcell	Satupaitea	Human Rights Protection Party
Leaana Ronnie Posini	Safata West	Human Rights Protection Party
Lealailepule Rimoni Aiafi	Faleata i Sisifo	Human Rights Protection Party
Hon Leaupepe Toleafoa Faafisi	Aana Alofi No. 1 West	Human Rights Protection Party
Lenatai Victor Tamapua	Vaimauga Sisifo No. 1	Human Rights Protection Party
Keneti Sio	Sagaga le Falefa	Human Rights Protection Party
Lopao'o Natanielu Mua	Vaisigano No. 1	Human Rights Protection Party
Laki Mulipola Leiataua	Aiga i le Tai	Human Rights Protection Party
Nafoitoa Talaimanu Keti	Gagaemauga No. 3	Human Rights Protection Party
Nonu Lose Niumata	Safata Sasae	Human Rights Protection Party
Olo Fiti Vaai	Salega East	Tautua Samoa Party
Hon Niko Lee Hang	Urban East	Human Rights Protection Party
Pa’u Sefo Pa’u	Faasaleleaga No. 2	Human Rights Protection Party
Peseta Vaifou Tevaga	Faasaleleaga No. 4	Human Rights Protection Party
Hon Sala Fata Pinati	Gagaemauga No. 1	Human Rights Protection Party
Dr Salausa John Ah Ching	Faleata Sasae (East)	Human Rights Protection Party
Seiuli Ueligitone Seiuli	Sagaga le Usoga	Human Rights Protection Party
Sili Epa Tuioti	Faasaleleaga No. 1 East	Human Rights Protection Party
So’oalo Umi Feo Mene	Gagaifomauga No. 2	Human Rights Protection Party
Sulamanaia Tauiliili Tuivasa	Vaimauga Sasae	Human Rights Protection Party
Taefu Lemi	Falelatai and Samatau	Human Rights Protection Party
Tafua Maluelue Tafua	Aleipata Itupa i Lalo	Human Rights Protection Party
Tapulesatele Mauteni Esera	Vaisigano No. 2	Human Rights Protection Party
Tialavea Fea Leniu Tionisio Hunt	Vaa o Fonoti	Human Rights Protection Party
Tofa Lio Foleni	Faasaleleaga No. 3	Human Rights Protection Party
Toleafoa Ken Vaafusuaga Poutoa	Lefaga and Faleaseela	Human Rights Protection Party
To'omata Aki Tuipea	Salega West	Human Rights Protection Party
Tuifaasisina Leleisiuao Palemene	Palauli Sasae	Human Rights Protection Party
Tuitama Talalelei Tuitama	Aana Alofi No. 1 East	Human Rights Protection Party

== Changes ==
- Pa’u Sefo Pa’u died on 19 January 2019. The subsequent by-election was won by Namulau'ulu Sami Leota.
