= 2023 Siʻumu by-election =

← 2021	15 September 2023	2025 →
	First party	Second party	Third party
Candidate	Tuʻuʻu Anasiʻi Leota	Faʻalogo Kapeli Lafaele	Tuʻuʻu Amaramo Sialaoa
Party	FAST	Independent	HRPP
Popular vote	658	521	196
Percentage	47.85%	37.89%	14.25%
MP before election
Tuʻuʻu Anasiʻi Leota
Independent
Elected MP
Tuʻuʻu Anasiʻi Leota
FAST

A by-election was held in the Siʻumu constituency in Samoa on 15 September 2023. The by-election was triggered by the resignation of the incumbent member Tuʻuʻu Anasiʻi Leota from the Human Rights Protection Party (HRPP) in order to become an independent in November 2022. Following a protracted court battle, the seat was declared vacant in July 2023. Leota joined the Faʻatuatua i le Atua Samoa ua Tasi (FAST) party shortly after the triggering of the by-election and is one of three candidates who contested the seat; the other two were Tuʻuʻu Amaramo Sialaoa of the HRPP and independent Faʻalogo Kapeli Lafaele. Leota reclaimed the seat, winning with 47% of the vote. His triumph, along with the success of the FAST candidates in the two concurrent by-elections in Faleata No. 4 and Vaʻa-o-Fonoti, handed FAST a two-thirds parliamentary majority.

== Background ==
During the previous general election, held in 2021, former cabinet minister Tuʻuʻu Anasiʻi Leota of the HRPP won the constituency with 41% of the vote. He defeated the incumbent representative and fellow HRPP member, Faalogo Iosefa Sopi and three other candidates, two from the HRPP and one from FAST.

Citing the request of many of his constituents, Leota, along with Ale Vena Ale and later Mauʻu Siaosi Puʻepuʻemai, resigned from the HRPP in November 2022. Leota, who had been an HRPP member for over 20 years at the time of his resignation, expressed frustration with party leader and former Prime Minister Tuilaʻepa Saʻilele Malielegaoi's refusal to step down after the HRPP's "shocking defeat" at the 2021 general election, its less-than-ideal performance in the subsequent by-elections that year and with him having been found guilty of contempt of court. Leota described the party leadership's role in the 2021 constitutional crisis as "embarrassing" and said the party had "abandoned its core values". The HRPP government passed a law shortly before the 2021 general election that required members of parliament to contest a by-election should they switch their affiliation during a parliamentary term. Leota and the other two former HRPP MPs challenged this law in court. When the trio refused to vacate their seats as ordered by Speaker Papaliʻi Liʻo Taeu Masipau, he pursued legal action. The trio reached an agreement with the speaker in July 2023, where they would relinquish their seats in exchange for him withdrawing the case against them, triggering the by-elections.

== Candidates ==
The nomination period for candidates to register was from 24 to 25 August, while the Office of the Electoral Commission (OEC) designated 31 August as the deadline for candidates who wish to withdraw. Three individuals have registered their candidacies: the ruling FAST party fielded the previous representative, Tuʻuʻu Anasiʻi Leota, who joined the party in July 2023, Tuʻuʻu Amaramo Sialaoa for the opposition HRPP, and independent Faʻalogo Kapeli Lafaele.

== Conduct ==
The OEC updated the constituency's electoral roll before revealing the by-election date on 19 August. A total of 2,259 voters enrolled, up from 2,191 in the 2021 general election. The OEC scheduled pre-polling for 13 September, while the return of the writ to occurred on 18 September. Individuals eligible to vote on the pre-polling day included essential workers, senior citizens over 65 and individuals with a disability; 74 voters applied to cast an early ballot. On pre-polling day, voting opened at 9:00 and concluded at 16:00 local time (UTC+13). On the day of the by-election, voting commenced at 8:00, concluding at 15:00. Voter presence at polling stations was reportedly light, with some having no long queues, and only around 35% of the electorate had voted by midday. A preliminary count subsequently began, while an official count occurred the following day.

== Results ==
Leota won the seat in the preliminary count, obtaining 599 votes, ahead of independent Faʻalogo Kapeli Lafaele's 505, while the HRPP's Tuʻuʻu Amaramo Sialaoa placed a distant third with 184. In the official count, Leota's plurality increased to 658 or 47%, Faʻalogo received 521 votes, 37%, and Sialaoa remained in third place with a final result of 14% or 196 votes. Around 60% of the constituency's registered voters participated in the by-election. In addition to FAST victories in the two other simultaneous by-elections in the Faleata No. 4 and Vaʻa-o-Fonoti constituencies, Leota's win increased FAST's parliamentary seat count to 35, providing the party with a two-thirds majority.

Candidate	Party	Votes	%
Tuʻuʻu Anasiʻi Leota	Faʻatuatua i le Atua Samoa ua Tasi	658	47.85
Faʻalogo Kapeli Lafaele	Independent	521	37.89
Tuʻuʻu Amaramo Sialaoa	Human Rights Protection Party	196	14.25
Total		1,375	100.00
Registered voters/turnout		2,259	–
