= Setefano =

Setefano is a name. Notable people with the name include:

- Setefano Cakau (born 1978), Fiji rugby union player
- Setefano Funaki (born 1992), Tongan rugby union player
- Setefano Somoca (born 1981), Fijian rugby union player
- Andrew Setefano (born 1987), Samoan footballer
- Ili Setefano Taʻateo, Samoan politician
- Mike Setefano, Samoa rugby league player
