= 2023 Faleata No. 4 by-election =

← 2021	15 September 2023	2025 →
- Turnout: 63.96%
	First party	Second party
Candidate	Ale Vena Ale	Ulu Bismarck Crawley
Party	FAST	Independent
Popular vote	953	488
Percentage	66.13%	33.87%
MP before election
Ale Vena Ale
Independent
Elected MP
Ale Vena Ale
FAST

A by-election was held in the Faleata No. 4 constituency in Samoa on 15 September 2023. The by-election was triggered by the resignation of sitting MP Ale Vena Ale from the Human Rights Protection Party (HRPP) in order to become an independent in November 2022, due to dissatisfaction with party leadership. Following a protracted court battle, the seat was declared vacant on 19 July 2023. Ale joined the Faʻatuatua i le Atua Samoa ua Tasi (FAST) party shortly after the announcement of the by-election and had one opponent, independent candidate Ulu Bismarck Crawley. Ale won in a landslide, earning 66% of the vote, which, in addition to FAST victories in two simultaneous by-elections in the Siʻumu and Vaʻa-o-Fonoti constituencies, gave the governing party a two-thirds parliamentary majority.

== Background ==
During the previous general election, held in 2021, Ale Vena Ale of the HRPP won the constituency with 53% of the vote. He defeated Ulu Bismarck Crawley, also of the HRPP and the Tautua Samoa Party's Lealasopo Leuiʻi Vaitagutu. Ale later expressed dissatisfaction with the HRPP, particularly party leader and former Prime Minister Tuilaʻepa Saʻilele Malielegaoi's refusal to step down despite the party's less-than-ideal performance in the 2021 general election and the subsequent by-elections. With the support of many of his constituents, Ale, alongside Tuʻuʻu Anasiʻi Leota, resigned from the HRPP to become independents in November 2022, adding that Tuila‘epa had become a "damaging factor" for the party. They were joined by Mauʻu Siaosi Puʻepuʻemai shortly after. However, the HRPP passed a law shortly before the 2021 general election, requiring members of parliament to contest by-elections should they leave their party during a parliamentary term. Ale said the party implemented the law in fear of defections and, along with the other two former HRPP MPs, challenged it in court. When they refused to vacate their seats as ordered by parliamentary Speaker Papaliʻi Liʻo Taeu Masipau, he pursued legal action against the trio. In July 2023, the trio agreed to relinquish their seats in exchange for the speaker withdrawing the legal challenge, triggering the by-elections in Faleata No. 4 and in the constituencies of the other two former HRPP MPs.

== Candidates ==
Nominations for candidates to register were open from 24 to 25 August, while the Office of the Electoral Commission (OEC) designated 31 August as the deadline for contestants to withdraw if they intend. Two individuals registered their candidacies. Ale Vena Ale announced on 19 July that he would contest as a FAST candidate and formally joined the party on 22 July. The other candidate, former chief executive officer of the ministry of natural resources and environment, Ulu Bismarck Crawley, who ran under the HRPP banner in 2021, filed to contest as an independent. The HRPP leader declared that the party would not run a candidate, adding the HRPP would not intervene in the internal matters of the constituency and honour its will.

== Conduct ==
The OEC announced the election date on 19 August. Shortly before scheduling the by-election, the OEC updated the constituency's electoral roll, with 2,253 registered voters, up from 2,171 in the 2021 general election. Pre-polling occurred on 13 September, while the return of the writ took place on 18 September. Individuals eligible to vote on the pre-polling day included essential workers, senior citizens over 65 and individuals with a disability; 152 voters applied to cast an early ballot. On pre-polling day, voting opened at 9:00 and concluded at 16:00 local time (UTC+13:00). On the day of the by-election, voting began at 8:00 and concluded at 15:00 (UTC+13:00). A preliminary count subsequently commenced, while an official count occurred the following day.

== Results ==
The preliminary result showed a landslide victory for Ale Vena Ale with 867 votes to independent Ulu Bismarck Crawley's 396. In the final count, Ale's vote share increased to 953 or 66%, while Ulu earned 488 votes, 33%, and voter turnout was 63%. FAST candidates also won the other two simultaneous by-elections in the Siʻumu and Vaʻa-o-Fonoti constituencies, which, along with Ale's triumph, handed FAST a two-thirds majority in parliament with 35 seats.

Candidate	Party	Votes	%
Ale Vena Ale	Faʻatuatua i le Atua Samoa ua Tasi	953	66.13
Ulu Bismarck Crawley	Independent	488	33.87
Total		1,441	100.00
Valid votes		1,441	100.00
Invalid/blank votes		0	0.00
Total votes		1,441	100.00
Registered voters/turnout		2,253	63.96
