= Tuʻuʻu Anasiʻi Leota =

Samoan politician

Minister of Revenue
- In office 20 February 2004 – 21 March 2011
- Prime Minister: Tuilaʻepa Saʻilele Malielegaoi
- Preceded by: Gaʻina Tino
- Succeeded by: Tuiloma Pule Lameko

Member of the Samoan Parliament for Siʻumu
- Incumbent
- Assumed office 24 October 2023
- Preceded by: Vacant
- In office 9 April 2021 – 19 July 2023
- Preceded by: Faalogo Iosefa Sopi
- Succeeded by: Vacant
- In office 1996 – 4 March 2016
- Preceded by: Tofaeono Anufesaina
- Succeeded by: Faalogo Iosefa Sopi

Personal details
- Party: Human Rights Protection Party; Independent; Faʻatuatua i le Atua Samoa ua Tasi

Tuʻuʻu Anasiʻi Leota is a Samoan politician and former Cabinet Minister. Previously a member of the Human Rights Protection Party, he is now a member of the Faʻatuatua i le Atua Samoa ua Tasi (FAST) party.

Leota was an accountant. He worked for the Treasury as Controller Of Stores/Assistant Secretary of Stores before resigning to run for Parliament. He was first elected to the Legislative Assembly of Samoa in 1996. In 2004 he was appointed Minister of Revenue in a Cabinet reshuffle following the death of Seumanu Aita Ah Wa. He was reappointed after the 2006 election. He ran unsuccessfully for deputy leader of the HRPP after the 2011 election, and was not reappointed to Cabinet.

In June 2013 Leota outraged the Samoan Parliament by using offensive language during a debate. In February 2014 RNZ reported that he was one of three Samoan MPs who had left the ruling HRPP to form a new party after a dispute over abuse of power by Finance Minister Faumuina Tiatia Liuga. Leota claimed that he was still a member of the HRPP, and later claimed the report that he was leaving the HRPP was a joke.

He lost his seat at the 2016 election. He was re-elected in the 2021 election.

On 3 November 2022 Tuʻuʻu and fellow MP Ale Vena Ale resigned from the HRPP to become independents, saying they did not want to remain in a party led by a leader guilty of contempt of court. Following a court challenge, their seats were declared vacant on 19 July 2023. He was subsequently endorsed as a FAST candidate in the resulting by-election, in which he was successful. His win, along with FAST victories in the simultaneous by-elections in the Faleata No. 4 and Vaʻa-o-Fonoti constituencies, handed FAST a two-thirds majority in parliament. Tuʻuʻu was sworn back into parliament on 24 October 2023.

On 17 January 2025 they were fired as an associate minister by prime minister Fiamē Naomi Mataʻafa after supporting her expulsion from the FAST party.

Legislative Assembly of Samoa
Preceded by Tofaeono Anufesaina	Member of Parliament for Siʻumu; 1996–2016	Succeeded by Faalogo Iosefa Sopi
Preceded by Faalogo Iosefa Sopi	Member of Parliament for Siʻumu; 2021–2023	Vacant Title next held by Himself
Vacant Title last held by Himself	Member of Parliament for Siʻumu; 2023–present	Incumbent
Political offices
Preceded by Gaʻina Tino	Minister of Revenue; 2004–2011	Succeeded by Tuiloma Pule Lameko
