= Fa'alogo =

Fa'alogo is a Samoan term meaning "the listener", which may be found as a first name, a surname, or an honorific.

It may refer to:

- David Fa'alogo (b. 1980), Samoan rugby league footballer
- Faalogo Iosefa Sopi, Samoan politicians
- Tana Umaga (b. 1973), New Zealand rugby union footballer and coach, who uses the Samoan honorific Faʻalogo
