= 2026 Falealili 1 by-election =

- 18 September 2026
	First party	Second party
Candidate	Seumafaleupolu Aperlia Tiai	Tuiloma Laniselota Lameko
Party	FAST	Independent
Popular vote	456	268
Percentage	28.54%	16.77%
	Third party	Fourth party
Candidate	Auseugalelei Uiti Lagavale	Patea Aipovi Patea
Party	FAST	Independent
Popular vote	245	207
Percentage	15.33%	12.95%
MP before election
Toelupe Poumulinuku Onesemo
FAST
Elected MP
Seumafaleupolu Aperlia Tiai
FAST

A by-election to the Legislative Assembly of Samoa was held in the Falealili 1 constituency on 18 September 2026. The by-election was triggered after the previous member, Toelupe Poumulinuku Onesemo, a former deputy prime minister, was convicted of election bribery. Seumafaleupolu Aperlia Tiai of the Faʻatuatua i le Atua Samoa ua Tasi (FAST) party won the seat with 28% of the vote, while independent candidate Tuiloma Laniselota Lameko placed second with 16%.

== Background ==
Toelupe Poumulinuku Onesemo of the FAST party was re-elected to the seat during the 2025 snap election with 53% of the vote, defeating three other candidates. FAST won a majority of seats at the snap election and went on to form a government under Prime Minister Laʻauli Leuatea Schmidt. Onesemo was appointed deputy prime minister and minister of works in the new cabinet. After the election, Tuiloma Laniselota Lameko, the unsuccessful from the Human Rights Protection Party (HRPP), filed an electoral petition against Onesemo, accusing him of election bribery. Before the case could proceed to trial, Lameko and Onesemo attempted to withdraw the petition. The Supreme Court, however, rejected their requests after finding that the duo had reached a 100,000 tālā settlement to withdraw the case. The case proceeded to trial, resulting in the court convicting Onesemo for bribery. Onesemo resigned from cabinet in the aftermath, but remained in parliament while he attempted to appeal the case. The Court of Appeal upheld Onesemo's conviction on 29 June, voiding his election and triggering a by-election in the constituency.

== Electoral system ==
Elections to all 51 of the directly elected seats in the Legislative Assembly are conducted through the first-past-the-post voting system. Candidates are required to hold a matai title, be at least 21 years old, and have resided in Samoa for a minimum of three years before the nomination date. Individuals convicted of a crime in Samoa or any other country within the previous eight years, and people with a mental illness, were ineligible to stand as candidates. Civil servants were permitted to run as long as they resigned from their positions. Should civil servants fail to do so, the date of filing their candidacy is, by law, deemed to be the point when they relinquish their role.

Universal Suffrage took effect in 1991, permitting all Samoan citizens aged 21 and over the right to vote. Compulsory voting and mandatory voter registration were in place for the by-election. Electors who failed to vote were required to pay 100 tālā, while eligible individuals who did not register on the electoral roll before the deadline were liable to pay a 2000 tālā fine. As Samoa did not employ overseas voting at the time of the by-election, electors enrolled in the Falealili 1 constituency were required to be present in the country to vote.

== Candidates ==
Seven individuals registered the candidacies to contest the election. FAST nominated four candidates: Auseugalelei Uiti Lagavale, Siʻa Alec Leaupepe Latu, Fuaolemolī Falaila Allen and Seumafaleupolu Aperlia Tiai. Latu previously contested the seat in 2025. Taveuveu Willie Tuatagaloa was chosen as the candidate for the HRPP. Tuiloma Laniselota Lameko contested the seat again, but did not run under the HRPP banner as in 2025. Instead, he was one of two independent candidates, alongside Patea Aipovi Patea.

== Conduct ==
Electoral Commissioner Toleafoa Tuiafelolo Stanley issued the election writ on 21 August, disclosing the by-election date. Candidate nominations took place on 28 August, while contestants had until 4 September to withdraw their candidacies if they intended to do so. Pre-polling occurred on 16 September, two days before the by-election. The electoral commissioner said polling day "went well", with no reported issues. The return of the writ is expected for 21 September.

== Results ==
In the preliminary count, Tiai led with 426 votes, ahead of Lameko, who had received 247. Tiai's victory was confirmed in the final count, increasing to 456 votes, while Lameko remained second with 268.

Candidate	Party	Votes	%
Seumafaleupolu Aperlia Tiai	Faʻatuatua i le Atua Samoa ua Tasi	456	28.54
Tuiloma Laniselota Lameko	Independent	268	16.77
Auseugalelei Uiti Lagavale	Faʻatuatua i le Atua Samoa ua Tasi	245	15.33
Patea Aipovi Patea	Independent	207	12.95
Taveuveu Willie Tuatagaloa	Human Rights Protection Party	162	10.14
Fuaolemolī Falaila Allen	Faʻatuatua i le Atua Samoa ua Tasi	132	8.26
Siʻa Alec Leaupepe Latu	Faʻatuatua i le Atua Samoa ua Tasi	128	8.01
Total		1,598	100.00
Source: Samoa Observer

== Aftermath ==
Reacting to his loss, Patea expressed disappointment, saying he had intended to curb political divisions in the constituency. Patea claimed to have seen individuals handing out money to entice voters the night before the election. He thanked the electorate and said, "the sun will rise again". Tiai was sworn into parliament on 20 October.
