= Namulauʻulu Sami Leota =

Samoan politician

Member of the Samoa Parliament for Faasaleleaga No. 2
- In office 22 March 2019 – 9 April 2021
- Preceded by: Paʻu Sefo Paʻu
- Succeeded by: Papaliʻi Liʻo Taeu Masipau

Personal details
- Party: Human Rights Protection Party

Namulauʻulu Papaliʻi Leota Sami Leota (born ca. 1968) is a Samoan politician and member of the Legislative Assembly of Samoa. He is a member of the Human Rights Protection Party.

Leota is a businessman who has worked for Federal Pacific Insurance and as a board member of the Central Bank of Samoa and Samoa National Provident Fund. He is also a former manager of the Samoa national rugby union team and President of the Samoa Rugby Union. He ran for parliament unsuccessfully at the 2016 election but lost to Paʻu Sefo Paʻu. Following Pa’u's death in 2019 he was elected in a by-election.

He ran in the seat of Faʻasaleleaga No. 3 at the 2021 election, but was unsuccessful. He later withdrew an election petition against the winner.

He stood again at the 2025 election and was re-elected to the legislative assembly.
