= Lagaʻaia Tiatuau Tufuga =

Samoan politician

Minister of Women, Community and Social Development
- In office 15 January 2025 – 16 September 2025
- Prime Minister: Fiamē Naomi Mataʻafa
- Preceded by: Mulipola Anarosa Ale Molioʻo
- Succeeded by: Moefaʻauouo Julius Tafunai

Member of the Samoan Parliament for Palauli No. 3
- In office 9 April 2021 – 3 June 2025
- Preceded by: Tuifaʻasisina Misa Lisati
- Succeeded by: Aiolupotea Misa Tony Aiolupo

Personal details
- Party: Samoa Uniting Party (since 2025)
- Other political affiliations: Faʻatuatua i le Atua Samoa ua Tasi (until 2025)

Lagaʻaia Tiaituau Tufuga (born c. 1955) is a Samoan politician and former Cabinet Minister. He is a member of the Samoa Uniting Party.

Tufuga is from the village of Faʻala in the Palauli district. He worked as a farmer before entering politics. He was first elected to the Legislative Assembly of Samoa in the 2021 Samoan general election. On 28 July 2021 he was appointed Associate Minister of Public Enterprises.

On 15 January 2025 he was appointed Minister of Women, Community and Social Development following the sacking of Mulipola Anarosa Ale Molioo.

Prime Minister Fiamē Naomi Mataʻafa called a snap election following the government's budget defeat in parliament on 27 May 2025. Tufuga ran as a Samoa Uniting Party candidate at the 2025 election but lost his seat to Aiolupotea Misa Tony Aiolupo of FAST. Tufuga's tenure as minister concluded on 16 September, and he was succeeded by Moefaʻauouo Julius Tafunai.

Legislative Assembly of Samoa
| Preceded by Tuifaʻasisina Misa Lisati | Member of Parliament for Palauli No. 3; 2021–2025 | Succeeded by Aiolupotea Misa Tony Aiolupo |
Political offices
| Preceded by Mulipola Anarosa Ale Molioʻo | Minister of Women, Community and Social Development; 2025 | Succeeded by Moefaʻauouo Julius Tafunai |
