= Ulu Vaomalo Kini =

Samoan politician

Minister of Police, Prisons and Fire
- In office 2 August 2003 – 24 April 2006
- Prime Minister: Tuila'epa Sa'ilele Malielegaoi
- Succeeded by: Leaupepe Toleafoa Faafisi

Minister of Sports, Youth and Culture
- In office 20 March 2001 – 24 April 2006
- Succeeded by: Fiamē Naomi Mataʻafa

Member of the Samoa Parliament for Faleata West
- In office 2000 – 31 March 2006
- Preceded by: Toi Aukuso Cain
- Succeeded by: Lealailepule Rimoni Aiafi

Personal details
- Party: Human Rights Protection Party

Ulu Vaomalo Kini is a Samoan politician and former Cabinet Minister. He is a member of the Human Rights Protection Party.

He was first elected to the Legislative Assembly of Samoa in a by-election in 2000. He was re-elected at the 2001 election and appointed Minister of Sports, Youth and Culture. In August 2003 he was made Samoa's first Minister of Police in a Cabinet reshuffle. He lost his seat at the 2006 election.

In December 2015 he was arrested and charged with one count of intentional damage after using an excavator to uproot crops and trees during a family land dispute. He was convicted in July 2016.
