= Afamasaga Leone Mati =

Samoan politician

Deputy Speaker of the Legislative Assembly of Samoa
- Incumbent
- Assumed office 16 September 2025
- Speaker: Auapaʻau Mulipola Aloitafua
- Preceded by: Auapaʻau Mulipola Aloitafua

Personal details
- Party: FAST
- Occupation: Politician

Afamasaga Leone Mati is a Samoan politician. She became the first woman elected Deputy Speaker of the Legislative Assembly of Samoa in 2025 and is member of the ruling Faʻatuatua i le Atua Samoa ua Tasi (FAST) party.

== Career ==
Afamasaga Mati Vaili Masame contested the 2025 Samoan general election as a FAST candidate in the Aʻana Alofi 4 constituency. She won the seat with 848 votes, defeating incumbent Toeolesulusulu Cedric Schuster, who received 454 votes, and as one of the five women elected.

On 16 September 2025 she was elected the first woman Deputy Speaker of the Legislative Assembly. She also chairs the parliamentary committee investigating allegations concerning opposition MPs.

== Personal life ==
Mati is member of the The Church of Jesus Christ of Latter-day Saints denomination.
