= 2010 Faleata West by-election =

By-election in Samoa

- 14 May 2010

Constituency of Faleata West
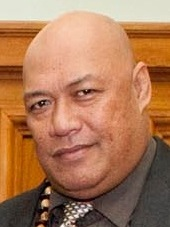
| | First party | Second party | Third party |
|---|---|---|---|
| | HRPP | | HRPP |
| Candidate | Ale Vena Ale | Lealailepule Rimoni Aiafi | Ulugia Petelo |
| Party | HRPP | TSP | HRPP |
| Popular vote | 1,045 | 963 | 748 |
| Percentage | 37.9% | 34.9% | 27.1% |
MP before election
Lealailepule Rimoni Aiafi
TSP
Subsequent MP
Ale Vena Ale
HRPP

A by-election was held in the Faleata West constituency in Samoa on 14 May 2010. The by-election was precipitated by the disqualification from the Legislative Assembly of Lealailepule Rimoni Aiafi for joining the Tautua Samoa Party. It was won by the Human Rights Protection Party's Ale Vena Ale.

== Irregularities ==
On 30 March 2010, HRPP candidate Ale Vena Ale complained to the Electoral Commissioner that non-resident voters were being registered for the by-election in the village of Vaitele.

On 3 April the village council of Toamua decided that it was compulsory for village residents to vote for Ale Vena.

== Candidates ==
- Lealailepule Rimoni Aiafi (Tautua Samoa Party)
- Ale Vena Ale (Human Rights Protection Party)
- Ulugia Petelo (Human Rights Protection Party)

== Results ==
2010 Faleata West by-election
| Party | Candidate | Votes | % | ±% |
|---|---|---|---|---|
| HRPP | Ale Vena Ale | 1045 | 37.9 | +91.7 |
| TSP | Lealailepule Rimoni Aiafi | 963 | 34.9 | +21.1 |
| HRPP | Ulugia Petelo | 748 | 27.1 | |
| Turnout | | 2756 | | +12.4 |
