= Toelupe Poumulinuku Onesemo =

Samoan politician

The Honourable Toelupe Poumulinuku Onesemo
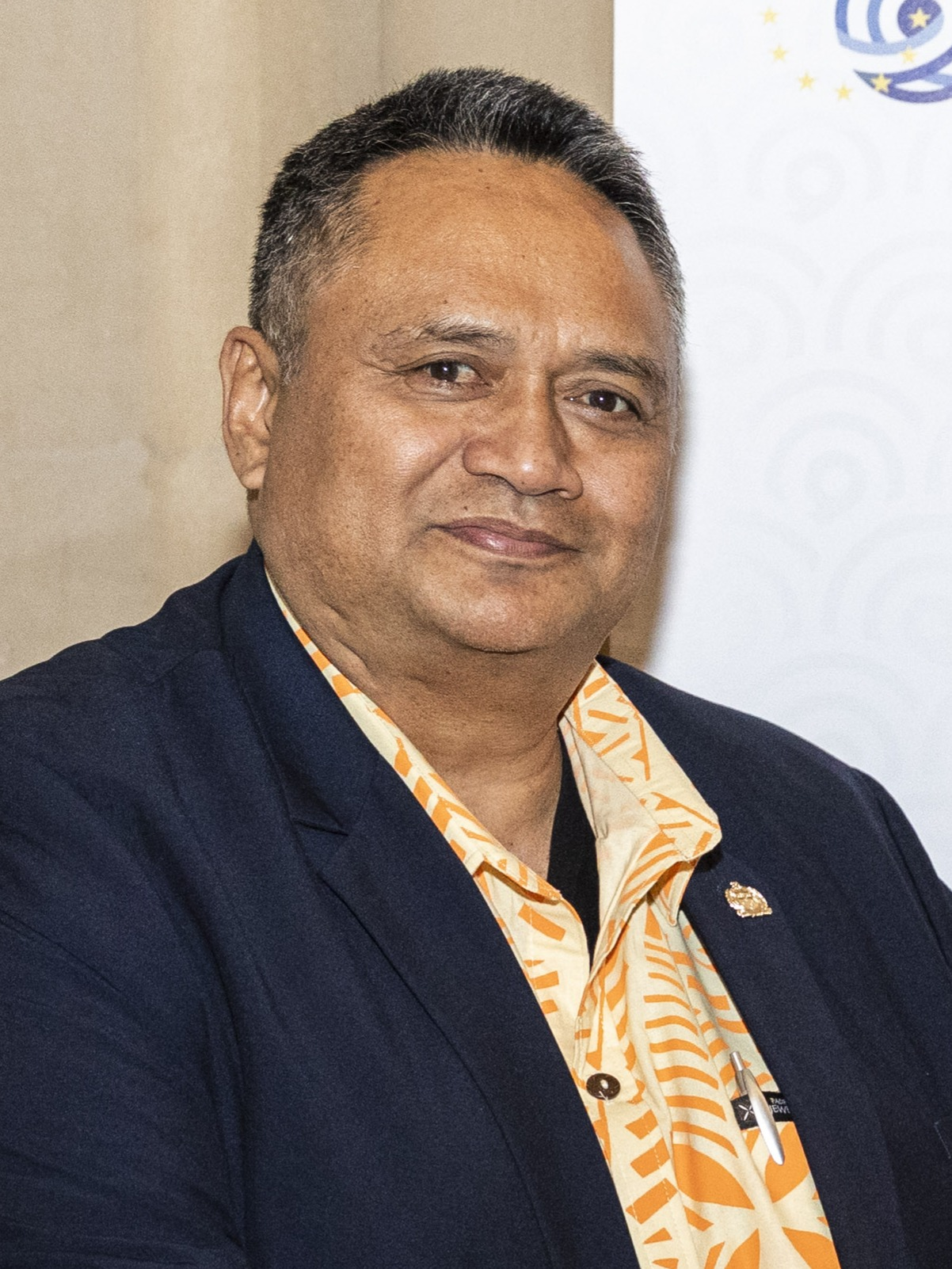
- Toelupe Poumulinuku Onesemo in 2025

Deputy Prime Minister of Samoa
- In office 16 September 2025 – 30 March 2026
- Prime Minister: Laʻauli Leuatea Schmidt
- Preceded by: Tuala Iosefo Ponifasio
- Succeeded by: Mulipola Anarosa Ale Molioʻo

Minister of Communications and Information Technology
- In office 24 May 2021 – 14 January 2025 (Note: Disputed: 24 May 2021 – 23 July 2021)
- Prime Minister: Fiamē Naomi Mataʻafa
- Preceded by: Afamasaga Rico Tupai
- Succeeded by: Mauʻu Siaosi Puʻepuʻemai

Member of the Samoan Parliament for Falealili 1
- In office 24 May 2021 – 29 June 2026
- Preceded by: Aumua Isaia Lameko

Personal details
- Party: Faʻatuatua i le Atua Samoa ua Tasi

Toelupe Maoiautele Poumulinuku Onesemo is a Samoan politician who has served as the deputy prime minister of Samoa from 2025 to 2026. He is a member of the Faʻatuatua i le Atua Samoa ua Tasi (FAST) party.

Onesemo was educated at the University of New South Wales in Sydney, Australia, obtaining a bachelor's and master's degree in civil engineering, as well as the University of the South Pacific, where he graduated with a Bachelor of Science and a teaching certificate. He worked as a teacher in Samoa from 1994 to 1999, and since 2002 has served as a public servant. In 2015 he was appointed chief executive of the Ministry of Works, Transport and Infrastructure.

He was first elected to the Legislative Assembly of Samoa in the April 2021 Samoan general election, winning the seat of Falealili No. 1.

On 24 May 2021 he was appointed Minister of Communications and Information Technology in the elected cabinet of Fiamē Naomi Mataʻafa. The appointment was disputed by the caretaker government. On 23 July 2021 the Court of Appeal ruled that the swearing-in ceremony was constitutional and binding, and that FAST had been the government since 24 May.

On 14 January 2025 he was dismissed by prime minister Fiamē Naomi Mataʻafa. He was replaced by Mauʻu Siaosi Puʻepuʻemai. On 15 January Mataʻafa was expelled from the FAST party and Onesemo was elected deputy chair.

Following FAST's victory at the 2025 snap election, Onesemo became deputy prime minister and minister of works in the cabinet of Prime Minister Laʻauli Leuatea Schmidt. The Supreme Court stripped Onesemo of his parliamentary seat in March 2026, after finding that he had engaged in bribery during the 2025 election. Onesemo resigned as deputy prime minister on 30 March, but appealed his conviction. He was later succeeded by Mulipola Anarosa Ale Molioʻo. The Court of Appeal upheld his conviction on 29 June, terminating his tenure as a member of parliament, which triggered a by-election in his constituency.

== Notes ==
Legislative Assembly of Samoa
Preceded by Aumua Isaia Lameko	Member of Parliament for Falealili 1; 2021–2026	Vacant
Political offices
Preceded by Afamasaga Rico Tupai	Minister of Communications and Information Technology; 2021–2025	Succeeded by Mauʻu Siaosi Puʻepuʻemai
Preceded by Tuala Iosefo Ponifasio	Deputy Prime Minister of Samoa; 2025–2026	Succeeded by Mulipola Anarosa Ale Molioʻo
Preceded by Olo Fiti Vaai	Minister of Works; 2025–2026	Succeeded by Laʻauli Leuatea Schmidt
