= Mauʻu Siaosi Puʻepuʻemai =

Samoan politician

Minister of Communications and Information Technology
- Incumbent
- Assumed office 15 January 2025
- Prime Minister: Fiamē Naomi Mataʻafa
- Preceded by: Toelupe Poumulinuku Onesemo

Member of the Samoan Parliament for Vaʻa-o-Fonoti
- Incumbent
- Assumed office 24 October 2023
- Preceded by: Vacant
- In office 9 April 2021 – 19 July 2023
- Preceded by: Tialavea Tionisio Hunt
- Succeeded by: Vacant

Personal details
- Party: Faʻatuatua i le Atua Samoa ua Tasi (since 2023); Independent (2022–2023); Human Rights Protection Party (until 2022)

Mauʻu Siaosi Puʻepuʻemai (born ca. 1972) is a Samoan politician and Cabinet Minister. He is a member of the Faʻatuatua i le Atua Samoa ua Tasi (FAST) party.

Mauʻu was raised in Fagaloa before moving to American Samoa. After returning to Samoa in the 1990s he opened a pizza shop, car rental business, and kava farm. He was first elected to the Legislative Assembly of Samoa in the April 2021 Samoan general election, defeating four other candidates to win the seat of Vaʻa o Fonoti.

Maʻu resigned from the HRPP on 25 November 2022 to become an independent, citing a request to do so by his constituents. Following a court challenge, their seats were declared vacant on 19 July 2023. He was subsequently endorsed as a FAST candidate in the resulting by-election. Mauʻu won with a commanding majority. His win, along with FAST victories in the simultaneous by-elections in the Siʻumu and Faleata No. 4 constituencies, handed FAST a two-thirds majority in parliament. Mauʻu was sworn back into parliament on 24 October 2023.

On 15 January 2025 he was appointed Minister of Communications and Information Technology following the sacking of Toelupe Poumulinuku Onesemo.

He contested the 2025 Samoan general election as an independent.

Legislative Assembly of Samoa
Preceded by Tialavea Tionisio Hunt	Member of Parliament for Vaʻa-o-Fonoti; 2021–2023	Vacant Title next held by Himself
Vacant Title last held by Himself	Member of Parliament for Vaʻa-o-Fonoti; 2023–present	Incumbent
