= 2016 Samoan general election =

- 4 March 2016

All 49 directly elected seats in the Legislative Assembly (and up to 5 additional female MPs)
- Turnout: 69.64%
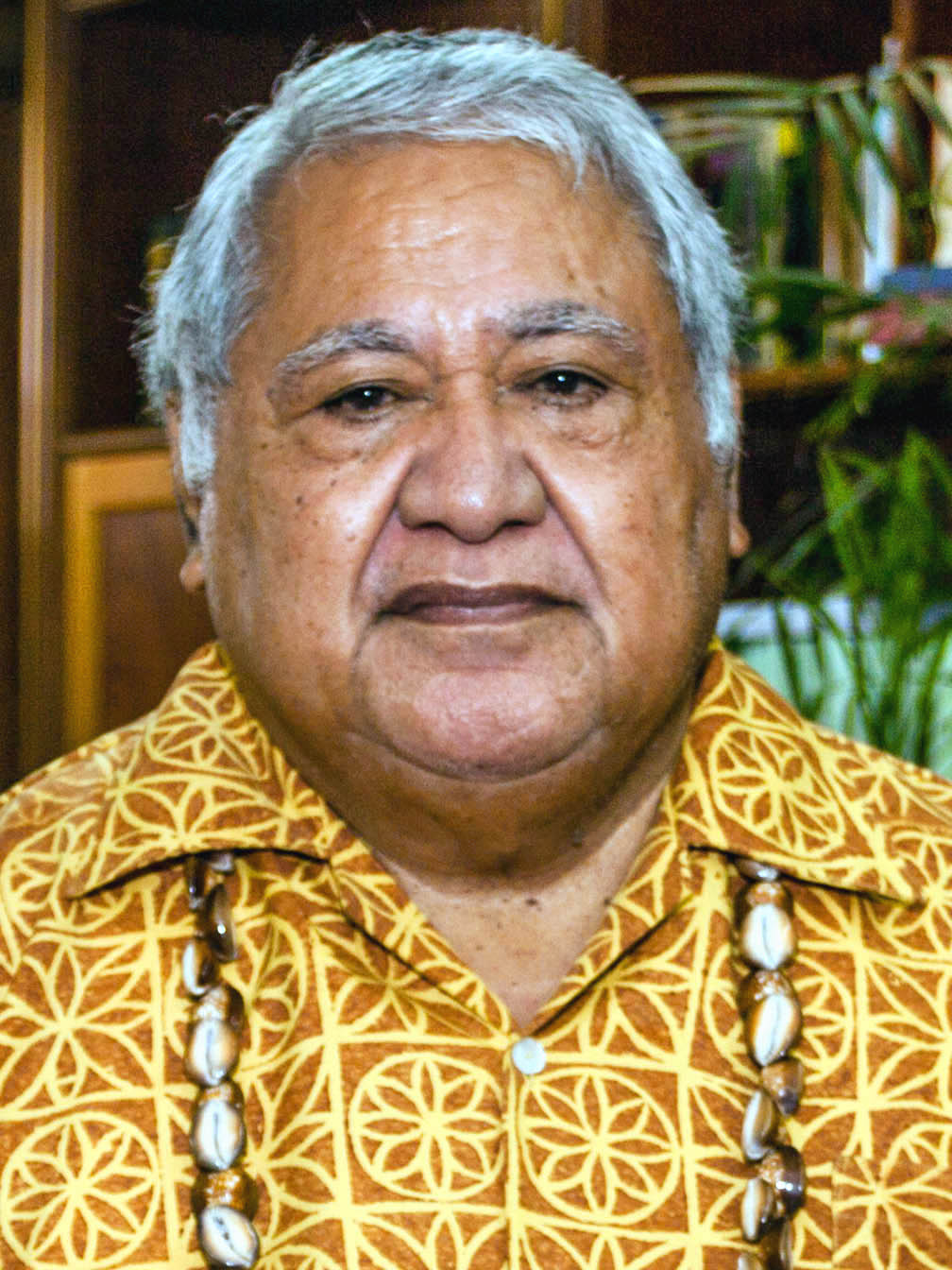
	First party	Second party
		Tautua
Leader	Tuilaʻepa Saʻilele Malielegaoi	Palusalue Faʻapo II
Party	HRPP	TSP
Last election	55.56%, 29 seats	24.71%, 13 seats
Seats won	35	2
Seat change	▲6	▼11
Popular vote	45,505	6,743
Percentage	56.92%	8.43%
Swing	▲1.36pp	▼16.28pp
Prime Minister before election
Tuilaʻepa Saʻilele Malielegaoi
HRPP
Subsequent Prime Minister
Tuilaʻepa Saʻilele Malielegaoi
HRPP

General elections were held in Samoa on 4 March 2016 to determine the composition of the 16th Parliament. Two parties contested the election, the ruling Human Rights Protection Party (HRPP), led by Prime Minister Tuilaʻepa Saʻilele Malielegaoi, which had been in government for most of the time since 1982, and the Tautua Samoa Party (TSP), led by Opposition Leader Palusalue Faʻapo II.

The election was held following the passage of electoral reforms, including the implementation of a parliamentary women's quota that requires the legislature to have at least five female members. Parliament also introduced electoral boundary changes in 2015, which saw the abolition of the six double-member constituencies and the individual voters' seats, the constituents of the latter including voters with partial or no Samoan ancestry and individuals not connected to a traditional village.

The HRPP won a landslide re-election, securing 35 seats; although several cabinet ministers lost their seats. The TSP suffered a significant loss and retained only two seats, down from 13 in the 2011 election, and the party's leader was among those unseated. Only four female candidates were successful, resulting in the appointment of an additional female member to fulfil the women's quota, which increased parliament's seat count to 50. Following the election, 12 independents joined the HRPP, which increased the party's seats to 47 and preserved the ruling party's dominance over Samoan politics. The TSP was joined by one independent, increasing the party's seat share to three. Because the TSP failed to win at least eight seats, it lost recognition as a parliamentary party, which left Samoa without an official opposition.

== Background ==
The HRPP had dominated Samoan politics from when it first came into power in 1982 and had governed the country for most of the time since then. The party's leader, Tuila‘epa Sa‘ilele Malielegaoi, had been prime minister since 1998. During the 2011 general election, the HRPP won re-election, securing 29 seats. The newly founded opposition TSP secured 13 seats, and independents won the remaining seven. Following that election, all independents joined the HRPP, while several individuals lost their seats due to electoral petitions. One of these MPs was TSP leader Vaʻai Papu Vailupe; he was subsequently replaced as leader by Deputy Leader Palusalue Faʻapo II.

=== TSP defections ===
Olo Fiti Vaai (then known as Levaopolo Talatonu Vaai) resigned from the party in November 2015 to found a new opposition party. However, he announced that he would contest the 2016 election as an independent.

In February 2016, the TSP's chief whip and founder, Lealailepule Rimoni Aiafi, defected to the HRPP, citing a request to do so by his constituents of Faleata West. Although Faʻapo respected Aiafi's decision, he was skeptical about the justification for the switch. Faʻapo expressed, "he (Aiafi) says it's what his constituency wants, but we all understand that decisions on which political party you choose is not up to your constituency because you cannot call the whole Faleata West constituency to meet and decide this." Malielegaoi believed that Aiafi's defection and his status as a founder of the TSP provided the opposition with a significant disadvantage.

== Electoral system ==
The 49 members of the Legislative Assembly were elected from 49 single-member constituencies. All seats were elected using first-past-the-post voting. Candidates were required to be at least 21 years of age, be a Matai and resident of the country for at least three years prior the nomination date. Civil servants and people with mental illness were ineligible to stand as candidates. People convicted for bribery or an electoral offense, and people given a prison sentence of more than two years (including the death sentence), were also ineligible. Around 116,000 electors were registered for the election. The Constitution Amendment Act 2013 ensures a minimum of 10 per cent of seats in parliament were reserved for women.

=== Electoral reforms ===
In 2013 a constitutional amendment was passed in parliament, mandating that at least five members of the legislative assembly are women. If this quota were unfulfilled following an election, the amendment permits parliament to establish up to five additional seats that would be allocated to the unsuccessful female candidates with the highest quantity of votes. Parliament passed legislation in 2014 barring candidates from providing gifts to villages within their constituency until after an election in an attempt to stamp out undue influence and prevent excessive electoral petitions that follow. Parliamentary hopefuls had traditionally presented gifts to potential voters upon declaring their candidacy.

==== Electoral boundary changes ====
The legislative assembly introduced constituency boundary changes in 2015. The six double-member constituencies were split into twelve constituencies, each represented by one member of parliament. The reform also abolished the two individual voters seats, that were for voters with partial or no Samoan ancestry or citizens that had no ties to any traditional village. The Urban East and Urban West constituencies replaced the individual seats, and consisted of voters in Apia residing on non-customary land or those not tied to a traditional village. Individuals living in Apia who did have ties to a traditional village outside the capital could choose to either enrol in their home constituency or one of the urban electorates so long as they had lived in Apia for at least six months. The creation of the urban electorates resulted from voters from traditional villages around Apia expressing discontent with urban settlers allegedly having an overbearing influence over the electoral outcome in their constituencies. The abolition of the double-member seats reduced an imbalance of representation to a certain extent, as voters in these electorates were permitted to cast two votes. During the redrawing process, a major priority was to ensure the boundaries remained organised around the traditional political districts, all of which were tied to matai titles, to prevent tensions from arising. Population distribution was less of a priority, resulting in some constituencies remaining disproportionately larger than others.

=== Voters ===
Enrollment of eligible voters was compulsory; however, it was voluntary to cast a ballot. Universal suffrage was introduced in 1990, permitting Samoan citizens over the age of 21 to vote in person. Voting registration usually closes six months before a general election and re-opens immediately after. Voters could elect to enrol in a constituency rather than the one where they reside by right of significant family ties or matai titles. As a result, the population of constituencies and the constituency's voter roll have not always correlated. Samoan citizens residing abroad were permitted to register, but the government refused to entertain overseas voting. Therefore, voters abroad had to travel to Samoa to cast their ballots. This decision drew criticism from the opposition TSP, which demanded the government permit overseas voting. Prime minister Malielegaoi defended his government's decision and dismissed the opposition's pleas as a "foolish tactic" that would lead to the country "being governed by overseas Samoans".

== Schedule ==
The election date was revealed in September 2015, and voter registration closed on 31 October of that year. The dissolution of parliament occurred on 29 January 2016, and the writ for the election was issued on 5 February. On the same day, the registration process for candidates opened and remained so until 18 February. The government declared 3 and 4 March to be a general election holiday. The return of writs occurred on 14 March.

Date	Event
31 October 2015	Registration for voters closes
29 January 2016	The 15th Parliament is dissolved
5 February 2016	O le Ao o le Malo issues Writ for the election
18 February 2016	Candidate nominations close
4 March 2016	Election day
14 March 2016	Writ for the election returned

== Parties and candidates ==
A total of 171 candidates were nominated. Five were subsequently disqualified and two withdrew, which resulted in 164 candidates contesting the election. There were 24 female candidates, up from nine in the 2011 election. Two parties contested the election, the ruling HRPP led by Prime Minister Tuilaʻepa Saʻilele Malielegaoi and the TSP led by Opposition Leader Palusalue Fa‘apo II. The HRPP fielded 81 candidates; the TSP 22 and 61 contenders ran as independents. However, 48 of the independents were associated with the HRPP and one was aligned with the TSP. The high quantity of Independents affiliated with the HRPP was due to the ruling party's policy of prioritising its incumbent members of parliament. In addition to four constituencies where the sole candidate was an HRPP member, candidates in 14 other constituencies solely consisted of hopefuls that were either a member of the HRPP or an affiliate of the party. Therefore, the HRPP was guaranteed to secure at least 18 seats. Several independents were affiliated with the TSP, although the number of these candidates was undefined.

Party	Leader	Candidates	Founded	2011 seats
Human Rights Protection Party	Tuilaʻepa Saʻilele Malielegaoi	81	1979	29 / 49
Tautua Samoa Party	Palusalue Faʻapo II	22	2008	13 / 49
Independents	—N/a	63	—N/a	7 / 49

== Campaign ==
Party politics played a minor role in this election, as candidates in one-third of the constituencies solely consisted of either HRPP members or independent contestants affiliated with the party. Although both party leaders appeared in the media, presenting their party's platforms, many contenders chose to campaign primarily on their personal record.

The HRPP released its manifesto in February 2016. The party promised to implement numerous developments, including an increase in employment, particularly amongst the youth, by bolstering apprenticeship and vocational training schemes to improve the rates of business establishment. Education was also a high priority for the party during the campaign. The HRPP pledged to extend the age of compulsory education from 14 to 17 years and to proceed with constructing schools throughout the country. The party also announced plans for healthcare development through a "Healthy Samoa" initiative. This plan included a boost in training health professionals, upgrading healthcare facilities and encouraging robust lifestyles via exercise throughout the country. Infrastructure development would continue under an additional term of the HRPP rule, including water sanitation, as would the party's efforts to combat climate change. During the campaign, Prime Minister Malielegaoi attacked the TSP's proposals, describing them as "weak" and "lacking substance". He also claimed, "The biggest issue I see is that they are copying our ideas" and asserted that his government's plans were "solid" because they did not "...take guesses" when planning projects. Malielegaoi also questioned how the TSP would fund their initiatives. Capital Radio Samoa predicted that the ruling party would win the elections.

The TSP promised to raise the minimum wage from WS$2.30 to WS$3.00 tālā per hour. Party Leader Faʻapo II argued that the HRPP government's 'boasting' about the country's WS$2 billion GDP "did not reflect positively on the minimum wage". The Samoa First Union applauded the minimum wage increase proposal, with the union's coordinator describing it as a "win-win for Samoa". The party also announced its intention to increase the retirement pension from WS$125 to WS$250 per month. Regarding the youth, the TSP pledged to introduce universal education, establish a branch of the National University of Samoa in Savaiʻi to serve students there and implement fees-free health care for children, including prescriptions without charge. Palusalue announced that the TSP would finance these initiatives by reversing the government's "reckless spending" on "failed development projects". He said these actions had been the cause of an increase in Samoa's foreign debt of over one billion tālā. The TSP declined to raise taxes. The party also vowed to abolish the three-year residency requirement that candidates must satisfy to be eligible to contest an election.

== Conduct ==
Voting commenced at 8:00 (UTC+14:00), most polling stations closed at 15:00, while special voting booths remained open until 17:00. A liquor ban was imposed with effect from the voting day and till 06:00 the next morning. No violence was reported during the voting. The Pacific Islands Forum and the Australian National University sent delegations to observe the electoral process.

In previous elections, candidates would directly provide transport for voters seeking to travel to polling stations. However, the government banned this practice before the election to reduce undue influence. But this law proved problematic for voters residing in rural or remote areas, as public transport was not in service, due to election day and the day prior being public holidays. Although some candidates hired taxis for voters, the lack of available transportation resulted in a lower turnout than in previous elections.

== Results ==
The provisional results showed the HRPP leading with 47 seats out of a maximum of 49. In the official tally, the HRPP won re-election in a landslide with 35 seats, while the TSP only secured two. Four HRPP candidates, including Prime Minister Malielegaoi and Justice Minister Fiamē Naomi Mataʻafa, were elected unopposed. TSP Leader Faʻapo lost his seat, and the party's only successful candidates were deputy leader Aʻeau Peniamina and newcomer Ili Setefano Taʻateo. Because the TSP's seat total fell below the eight-member threshold, it lost recognition as a parliamentary party. Independents won the remaining 13 seats. Despite the ruling party's victory, several cabinet ministers lost re-election and half of the elected MPs were newcomers. Four women MPs were elected and a fifth, the unsuccessful female candidate with the highest percentage of votes, was added to meet the quota requirements of 10% female MPs. Faʻaulusau Rosa Duffy-Stowers, an independent candidate who placed second in the Gagaʻifomauga No. 3 constituency, was selected increasing the parliament's strength to 50 members. The result ensured a continuation of the HRPP's dominance over Samoan politics.

Party	Votes	%	Seats	+/–
Human Rights Protection Party	45,505	56.92	35	+6
Tautua Samoa Party	6,743	8.43	2	−11
Independents	27,704	34.65	13	+6
Total	79,952	100.00	50	+1
Valid votes	79,952	99.06		
Invalid/blank votes	759	0.94		
Total votes	80,711	100.00		
Registered voters/turnout	115,901	69.64		
Source: Government of Samoa, OEC, Election Passport

=== By constituency ===
Constituency	Turnout	Political party	Candidate	Votes	%
Vaimauga East	2,259	Independent	Sulamanaia Tauiliili Tuivasa	997	44.1
Vaimauga East	2,259	HRPP	Tuisugaletaua Sofara Aveau	891	39.4
Vaimauga East	2,259	Independent	Tafaese Uili Lautua	371	16.4
Vaimauga West No. 1	2,198	HRPP	Lenatai Victor Tamapua	1,150	52.3
Vaimauga West No. 1	2,198	Independent	Lautimuia Uelese Vaʻai	898	40.9
Vaimauga West No. 1	2,198	Independent	Patū Sola Siaosi Hunt	150	6.8
Vaimauga West No. 2	2,097	HRPP	Faʻaolesa Katopau Ainuʻu	1,556	74.2
Vaimauga West No. 2	2,097	TSP	Lefau Harry Schuster	482	23.0
Vaimauga West No. 2	2,097	Independent	Tauamamanuvao Falani Mamea	59	2.8
Faleata East	2,364	HRPP	Salausa John Ah Ching	756	32.0
Faleata East	2,364	HRPP	Aulavemai Tafito Selesele	606	25.6
Faleata East	2,364	TSP	Aveau Niko Palamo	548	23.2
Faleata East	2,364	HRPP	Nuu Tapasu Leung Wai	454	19.2
Faleata West	3,327	HRPP	Lealailepule Rimoni Aiafi	1,102	33.1
Faleata West	3,327	HRPP	Ulu Bismarck Crawley	968	29.1
Faleata West	3,327	HRPP	Ale Vena Ale	909	27.3
Faleata West	3,327	HRPP	Moala Panoa Tavita	348	10.5
Sagaga-Le-Falefa	3,412	Independent	Loau Keneti Sio	1,536	45.0
Sagaga-Le-Falefa	3,412	HRPP	Tuisa Tulimasealii Tasi	1,087	31.9
Sagaga-Le-Falefa	3,412	Independent	Tagaloatele Pasi Poloa	789	23.1
Sagaga-Le-Usoga	2,196	HRPP	Seiuli Ueligitone Seiuli	1,062	48.4
Sagaga-Le-Usoga	2,196	Independent	Maulolo Tavita Amosa	527	24.0
Sagaga-Le-Usoga	2,196	Independent	Fata Meafou	341	15.5
Sagaga-Le-Usoga	2,196	Independent	Togatalimā Faafouina Milford	266	12.1
Aʻana Alofi No. 1 East	1,756	HRPP	Tuitama Talalelei Tuitama	691	39.4
Aʻana Alofi No. 1 East	1,756	Independent	Fesolai Tusiupu Tuigamala	549	31.3
Aʻana Alofi No. 1 East	1,756	Independent	Fesolai Aleni Sofara	516	29.4
Aʻana Alofi No. 1 West	1,170	HRPP	Leaupepe Toleafoa Faafisi	570	48.7
Aʻana Alofi No. 1 West	1,170	Independent	Aiono Tile Gafa	466	39.8
Aʻana Alofi No. 1 West	1,170	Independent	Lolomatauma Eseta Mataituli	72	6.2
Aʻana Alofi No. 1 West	1,170	Independent	Leaupepe Savelio Leaupepe	62	5.3
Aʻana Alofi No. 2	1,478	TSP	Ili Setefano Taʻateo	878	59.4
Aʻana Alofi No. 2	1,478	HRPP	Tolofuaivalelei Falemoe Leiʻataua	600	40.6
Aʻana Alofi No. 3	1,780	HRPP	Afamasaga Rico Tupai	896	50.3
Aʻana Alofi No. 3	1,780	TSP	Toeolesulusulu Cedric Schuster	768	43.2
Aʻana Alofi No. 3	1,780	HRPP	Leituala Logona Vaafusuaga	116	6.5
Aiga-i-le-Tai	3,069	Independent	Laki Mulipola Leiataua	1,467	47.8
Aiga-i-le-Tai	3,069	HRPP	Ifopo Matia Filisi	847	27.6
Aiga-i-le-Tai	3,069	Independent	Mulipola Taupau Oliva	654	21.3
Aiga-i-le-Tai	3,069	Independent	Tautaiolevao Tautala Asovale	101	3.3
Falelatai and Samatau	2,001	HRPP	Taefu Lemi	889	44.4
Falelatai and Samatau	2,001	Independent	Anae Misa Pita II Anae	780	39.0
Falelatai and Samatau	2,001	Independent	Toomaga Taefu Salapu	332	16.6
Lefaga and Faleseʻela	2,510	HRPP	Toleafoa Ken Vaafusuaga Poutoa	945	37.7
Lefaga and Faleseʻela	2,510	HRPP	Sua Tanielu Faiaoga	752	30.0
Lefaga and Faleseʻela	2,510	HRPP	Lemalu Silivia Taupau	451	18.0
Lefaga and Faleseʻela	2,510	HRPP	Masinalupe Tusipa Venu	231	9.2
Lefaga and Faleseʻela	2,510	HRPP	Lemalu Nele Leilua	86	3.4
Lefaga and Faleseʻela	2,510	TSP	Unasa Tauaipolu Iulia Petelo	45	1.8
Safata East	1,351	HRPP	Nonu Lose Niumata	548	40.6
Safata East	1,351	Independent	Leota-Suatlele Manusegi	407	30.1
Safata East	1,351	HRPP	Laumatiamanu Ringo Purcell	396	29.3
Safata West	2,404	Independent	Leaana Ronnie Posini	1,020	42.4
Safata West	2,404	TSP	Palusalue Faʻapo II	709	29.5
Safata West	2,404	HRPP	Manualesagalala Mati Lemalu	675	28.1
Siʻumu	1,568	Independent	Faalogo Iosefa Sopi	778	49.7
Siʻumu	1,568	HRPP	Tuʻuʻu Anasiʻi Leota	738	47.2
Siʻumu	1,568	Independent	Afoa Fetulima	49	3.1
Falealili East	1,205	HRPP	Fuimaono Teo Samuelu	439	36.4
Falealili East	1,205	HRPP	Maiava Viiga Fuimaono	355	29.5
Falealili East	1,205	TSP	Fuimaono Aloalii Alex Wright	348	28.9
Falealili East	1,205	HRPP	Tofuaiofoia Falefa Lima	37	3.1
Falealili East	1,205	HRPP	Fuimaono Esera Rimoni	26	2.2
Falealili West	2,071	Independent	Aumua Isaia Lameko	744	35.9
Falealili West	2,071	HRPP	Tulsa Misi Tupuola	737	35.6
Falealili West	2,071	Independent	Teo Uuvalu Mauga	323	15.6
Falealili West	2,071	HRPP	Vaetuifeai Poe Elama	166	8.0
Falealili West	2,071	Independent	Tuiloma Agaalii Liliva	101	4.9
Aleipata Itupa-I-Lalo	1,859	HRPP	Tafua Maluelue Tafua	963	51.8
Aleipata Itupa-I-Lalo	1,859	Independent	Tuiavii Poloma Eteuati	540	29.1
Aleipata Itupa-I-Lalo	1,859	Independent	Faagasealii Sapoa Feagiai	182	9.8
Aleipata Itupa-I-Lalo	1,859	Independent	Vaimasanuu Zita Martel	93	5.0
Aleipata Itupa-I-Lalo	1,859	TSP	Letiu Tamatoa Penaia	81	4.4
Vaʻa-o-Fonoti	1,145	HRPP	Tialavea Tionisio Hunt	573	50.0
Vaʻa-o-Fonoti	1,145	Independent	Leilua Tavas Leota	254	22.2
Vaʻa-o-Fonoti	1,145	Independent	Molioo Pio Leo	215	18.8
Vaʻa-o-Fonoti	1,145	Independent	Ofoia Vaipua Nomeneta	103	9.0
Anoamaʻa East	1,556	HRPP	Alaiasa Sepulona Moananu	721	46.3
Anoamaʻa East	1,556	HRPP	Alaiasa Malia Elisapeta	342	22.0
Anoamaʻa East	1,556	TSP	Poloai Akapo	209	13.4
Anoamaʻa East	1,556	HRPP	Manu L. Maugatai	157	10.1
Anoamaʻa East	1,556	Independent	Tofae Alailima Ropeti	107	6.9
Anoamaʻa East	1,556	TSP	Alaiasa Elena	20	1.3
Anoamaʻa West	1,919	HRPP	Fonotoe Pierre Lauofo	1,169	60.9
Anoamaʻa West	1,919	Independent	Leota-Leuluaialii Ituau Ale	412	21.5
Anoamaʻa West	1,919	Independent	Tufeao Faatuai Pulepule	338	17.6
Faʻasaleleʻaga No. 1 East	1,503	HRPP	Sili Epa Tuioti	549	36.1
Faʻasaleleʻaga No. 1 East	1,503	Independent	Pauli Ivan Joseph Williams	543	36.1
Faʻasaleleʻaga No. 1 East	1,503	HRPP	Leatigaga Tuasivi Samoa	411	27.4
Faʻasaleleʻaga No. 1 West	1,589	HRPP	Gatoloaifaana Amataga Alesana-Gidlow	893	56.2
Faʻasaleleʻaga No. 1 West	1,589	HRPP	Magele Mauiliu Magele	625	39.3
Faʻasaleleʻaga No. 1 West	1,589	TSP	Talalafai Kapeli Vaiola	35	2.2
Faʻasaleleʻaga No. 1 West	1,589	TSP	Suafoa Faimata Fauena Sua	21	1.3
Faʻasaleleʻaga No. 1 West	1,589	Independent	Vaasilifiti Moelagi Jackson	15	0.9
Faʻasaleleʻaga No. 2	2,359	HRPP	Paʻu Sefo Paʻu	823	34.9
Faʻasaleleʻaga No. 2	2,359	HRPP	Namulauulu Leota Sami	784	33.2
Faʻasaleleʻaga No. 2	2,359	TSP	Papaliʻi Liʻo Taeu Masipau	752	31.9
Faʻasaleleʻaga No. 3	1,460	HRPP	Tofa Lio Foleni	602	41.2
Faʻasaleleʻaga No. 3	1,460	Independent	Tea Toala Peato	516	35.3
Faʻasaleleʻaga No. 3	1,460	HRPP	Unasa Faapupula Metuli	257	17.6
Faʻasaleleʻaga No. 3	1,460	HRPP	Tooala Tulouna Lepou	85	5.8
Faʻasaleleʻaga No. 4	1,242	HRPP	Peseta Vaifou Tevaga	678	54.6
Faʻasaleleʻaga No. 4	1,242	Independent	Vui Umamalu Sione	564	45.4
Gagaʻemauga No. 1	1,969	HRPP	Sala Fata Pinati	1,064	54.0
Gagaʻemauga No. 1	1,969	Independent	Tuala Iosefo Ponifasio	855	43.4
Gagaʻemauga No. 1	1,969	TSP	Sala Malautea Iose McCarty	50	2.5
Gagaʻemauga No. 2	758	HRPP	Faʻasoʻotauloa Pati Taulapapa	216	28.5
Gagaʻemauga No. 2	758	HRPP	Seuoti Sheryl Muagututia	183	24.1
Gagaʻemauga No. 2	758	HRPP	Aufai Levaopolo Amuimuia	169	22.3
Gagaʻemauga No. 2	758	HRPP	Semau Faamau Levi	163	21.5
Gagaʻemauga No. 2	758	HRPP	Lofipo Faletolu Ula	27	3.6
Gagaʻemauga No. 3	1,584	Independent	Nafoitoa Talaimanu Keti	838	52.9
Gagaʻemauga No. 3	1,584	HRPP	Faamoetauloa Ulaitino Faale Tumaalii	746	47.1
Gagaʻifoimauga No. 1	1,115	HRPP	Faimalotoa Kika Stowers	632	56.7
Gagaʻifoimauga No. 1	1,115	Independent	Lavea Natoealofa Ieti	483	43.3
Gagaʻifoimauga No. 2	1,308	HRPP	Soʻoalo Umi Feo Mene	891	68.1
Gagaʻifoimauga No. 2	1,308	Independent	Taulealeausumai Aumalaga Tiotio	209	16.0
Gagaʻifoimauga No. 2	1,308	TSP	Manuta Lavamaile Uesile	208	15.9
Gagaʻifoimauga No. 3	1,096	HRPP	Laʻauli Leuatea Schmidt	707	64.5
Gagaʻifoimauga No. 3	1,096	Independent	Faʻaulusau Rosa Duffy-Stowers	389	35.5
Vaisigano No. 1	1,412	Independent	Lopaoʻo Natanielu Mua	899	63.7
Vaisigano No. 1	1,412	Independent	Paialiʻi Mao II Ropati	201	14.2
Vaisigano No. 1	1,412	TSP	Vaʻai Papu Vailupe	193	13.7
Vaisigano No. 1	1,412	Independent	Amituanai Tautofi Roma	64	4.5
Vaisigano No. 1	1,412	HRPP	Tufuga Gafoaleata Faitua	55	3.9
Vaisigano No. 2	1,180	HRPP	Tapulesatele Mauteni Esera	718	60.8
Vaisigano No. 2	1,180	TSP	Motuopuaʻa Uifagasa Aisoli	462	39.2
Falealupo	887	TSP	Aʻeau Peniamina	372	41.9
Falealupo	887	HRPP	Seumanutafa Akerei Salesa	329	37.1
Falealupo	887	HRPP	Aʻeau Niulesa Mareko Lamositele	186	21.0
Alataua West	1,217	Independent	Aliʻimalemanu Alofa Tuuau	432	35.5
Alataua West	1,217	Independent	Aiolupotea Taʻatiti Visekota	332	27.3
Alataua West	1,217	HRPP	Lafaitele Patrick Leiataualesa	280	23.0
Alataua West	1,217	Independent	Tuifaiga Loluama Yoshida Tuimaualuga	100	8.2
Alataua West	1,217	TSP	Pei Iefata Reupena Tauiliʻili	62	5.1
Alataua West	1,217	Independent	Momoemausu Siaifa Uipa	11	0.9
Salega East	678	Independent	Olo Fiti Vaai	305	45.0
Salega East	678	HRPP	Tupuai Suimai Tapuai	173	26.3
Salega East	678	TSP	Tapuai Toese Ah Sam	164	24.2
Salega East	678	HRPP	Tupuai Titi Fuli	31	4.6
Salega West	1,191	HRPP	Toʻomata Aki Tuipea	730	61.3
Salega West	1,191	TSP	Afualo Wood Salele	461	38.7
Palauli East	1,841	Independent	Tuifaʻasisina Misa Lisati	972	52.8
Palauli East	1,841	HRPP	Afoafouvale John Moors	664	36.1
Palauli East	1,841	Independent	Fiso Evelini Faʻamoe	123	6.7
Palauli East	1,841	TSP	Fiso Taranaki Mailei-Tamasese	82	4.5
Palauli West	1,957	Independent	Afoa Amituanai Faleulu Mauli	710	36.3
Palauli West	1,957	Independent	Leotamanusala Lene Leota	479	24.5
Palauli West	1,957	HRPP	Agafili Patisela Eteuati Tolovaa	452	23.1
Palauli West	1,957	Independent	Mulipola Opalani Ah Ching	316	16.2
Palauli-Le-Falefa	1,978	HRPP	Faumuina Tiatia Liuga	762	38.5
Palauli-Le-Falefa	1,978	Independent	Leota Laki Lamositele-Sio	671	33.9
Palauli-Le-Falefa	1,978	TSP	Tiatia Mapesone Malo	545	27.6
Urban East	1,735	HRPP	Tapunuu Niko Lee Hang	1,360	78.4
Urban East	1,735	Independent	Pulemagafa Mara Coffin Hunter	326	18.8
Urban East	1,735	HRPP	Namulauulu M. Nuualofa	49	2.8
Urban West	3,201	HRPP	Faumuina Asi Pauli Wayne Fong	1,198	37.4
Urban West	3,201	HRPP	Maualaivao Pat Ah Him	1,096	34.2
Urban West	3,201	HRPP	Matafeo Falanaipupu Tanielu Aiafi	881	27.5
Urban West	3,201	HRPP	Matamua Fred Amoa	26	0.8
Sources: Psephos, OEC

==== Uncontested ====
The following candidates were elected unopposed:

Constituency	Candidate	Party
Aleipata Itupa-I-Luga	Amituanai Fagaivalu Kenrick Samu	HRPP
Lepā	Tuilaʻepa Saʻilele Malielegaoi	HRPP
Lotofaga	Fiamē Naomi Mataʻafa	HRPP
Satupaʻitea	Lautafi Fio Selafi Purcell	HRPP
Source: Psephos

== Aftermath ==
After the election, 12 of the 13 independents joined the HRPP. The only independent who did not follow suit was Olo Fiti Vaai, who expressed that he was "saddened" by the TSP's overwhelming loss. He instead opted to rejoin the TSP, claiming to have rejected multiple offers to join the HRPP. At the first convention of the 16th parliament, the HRPP caucus was 47 members strong, while the TSP had three members.

Prime Minister Malielegaoi thanked the citizens for "the overwhelming vote of confidence in our vision for [Samoa]". He credited his party's landslide victory to its "ability to deliver on its promises". He also proclaimed that the most pressing issue to be dealt with by his government in its next term was climate change. Malielegaoi denied claims that his government had evolved into a dictatorship and pointed to a speech he presented in Savaiʻi during the campaign season to HRPP candidates warning them not to seek election to the legislative assembly if they only intend to use their office for "personal gains". The prime minister also highlighted institutions such as the ministry of police and prisons, the ombudsman's office and the office of the auditor as mechanisms to prevent government corruption. The HRPP celebrated its electoral triumph by holding a traditional ʻAva ceremony. On 5 March, the HRPP elected long-serving cabinet minister Fiamē Naomi Mataʻafa deputy leader. She defeated fellow veteran HRPP member Faumuina Tiatia Liuga by a caucus vote of 21 to 19.

Faʻapo congratulated the prime minister and the HRPP but also expressed that the result surprised the TSP. He said, "The truth is I’m extremely disappointed. As a party, the result is not what we expected, and we are very sad...". The TSP leader said the absence of an official opposition did not bode well for Samoa and made the country a "one-party state". Faʻapo blamed the TSP's landslide loss on vote-buying. The former shadow minister of finance Afualo Wood Salele shared this sentiment, claiming that candidates offered bags of rice and other foods to voters. The prime minister rejected the TSP's allegations, stating, "You see the first person that claims they did not do wrong is the very person that did wrong", and highlighted an amendment parliament passed before the election that imposed a strict ban on bribery. Malielegaoi claimed the TSP's downfall was due to negligence in leadership and an unfavourable campaign strategy. Vaai requested that the HRPP consider lowering the seat quota for parties to attain recognition in parliament; members of the ruling party echoed this statement. Palusalue also criticised the policy and stated, "In any democracy, there has to be an opposition party. In my opinion, the number of members should be irrelevant. There must still be a recognised opposition party." With the absence of an official opposition, Malielegaoi instructed 19 HRPP caucus members who were not appointed associate ministers to play the role of the opposition along with the Tautua Samoa MPs. Faʻapo ceased to be the TSP leader following his defeat, and the party did not elect a successor.

Prime Minister Malielegaoi appointed seven new cabinet ministers. Although re-elected to parliament, Deputy Prime Minister Fonotoe Pierre Lauofo was not reappointed to cabinet; he was previously fined for traffic offences in 2014. Lauofo was replaced by Fiamē Naomi Mataʻafa, who became Samoa's first female deputy prime minister.

The O le Ao o le Malo, Tui Ātua Tupua Tamasese Efi, officially opened the 16th parliamentary session on 18 March 2016.

== See also ==
- List of members of the Legislative Assembly of Samoa (2016–2021)
