= Deputy Prime Minister of Samoa =

Deputy head of government of the Independent State of Samoa

The deputy prime minister of the Independent State of Samoa (Samoan: Sui Palemia o le Malo Tuto’atasi o Sāmoa) is the deputy head of government of Samoa. The deputy prime minister is a member of the Legislative Assembly and cabinet, and is appointed by the O le Ao o le Malo (head of state) on the advice of the prime minister. The incumbent, Mulipola Anarosa Ale Molioʻo of the Faʻatuatua i le Atua Samoa ua Tasi (FAST) party, has served since 26 May 2026.

== List of officeholders ==
- Tofilau Eti Alesana (13 April 1982 – 18 September 1982)
- Tui Ātua Tupua Tamasese Efi (1985–1988)
- Tuila'epa Sa'ilele Malielegaoi (1991–1998)
- Vacant (23 November 1998 – 19 March 2001)
- Misa Telefoni Retzlaff (19 March 2001 – 20 March 2011)
- Fonotoe Pierre Lauofo (21 March 2011 – 18 March 2016)
- Fiamē Naomi Mataʻafa (19 March 2016 – 11 September 2020)
- Vacant (11 September 2020 – 24 May 2021)
- Tuala Iosefo Ponifasio (24 May 2021 – 16 September 2025)
- Toelupe Poumulinuku Onesemo (16 September 2025 – 30 March 2026)
- Vacant (30 March – 26 May 2026)
- Mulipola Anarosa Ale Molioʻo (26 May 2026 – present)

== See also ==
- Prime Minister of Samoa
- Deputy prime minister
