= Afoa Amituanai Faleulu Mauli =

Samoan politician

Member of the Samoa Parliament for Palauli Sisifo
- In office 4 March 2016 – 9 April 2021
- Preceded by: Afoafouvale John Moors
- Succeeded by: Mulipola Anarosa Ale Molioo

Personal details
- Party: Human Rights Protection Party

Afoa Amituanai Faleulu Mauli is a Samoan politician and member of the Legislative Assembly of Samoa. He is a member of the Human Rights Protection Party.

Mauli was born in Sinamoga. He worked in a bank and studied with the Samoa Institute of Accounting to become an accountant, before working for the University of the South Pacific in Fiji. In 2008 he successfully sued the university for defamation after a report criticised him for inadequately performing as financial manager. He later studied at the University of Auckland in New Zealand, and joined the New Zealand Institute of Accountants. He runs a motel and nightclub in Apia. From 2012 to 2016 he was chair of the Samoa Tourism Authority.

He unsuccessfully ran for Parliament in the 2006 and 2011 elections, before being elected in 2016. In May 2020, at the urging of his constituency, he was one of the few government MPs to speak out against the Land and Titles Bill.

In February 2021, Mauli claimed in the Samoan Parliament that the COVID-19 pandemic was a "hoax" and vaccines are "poison". He subsequently lost his seat in the 2021 election
