= Mulipola Anarosa Ale Molioʻo =

Samoan politician

The Honourable Mulipola Anarosa Ale Molioʻo
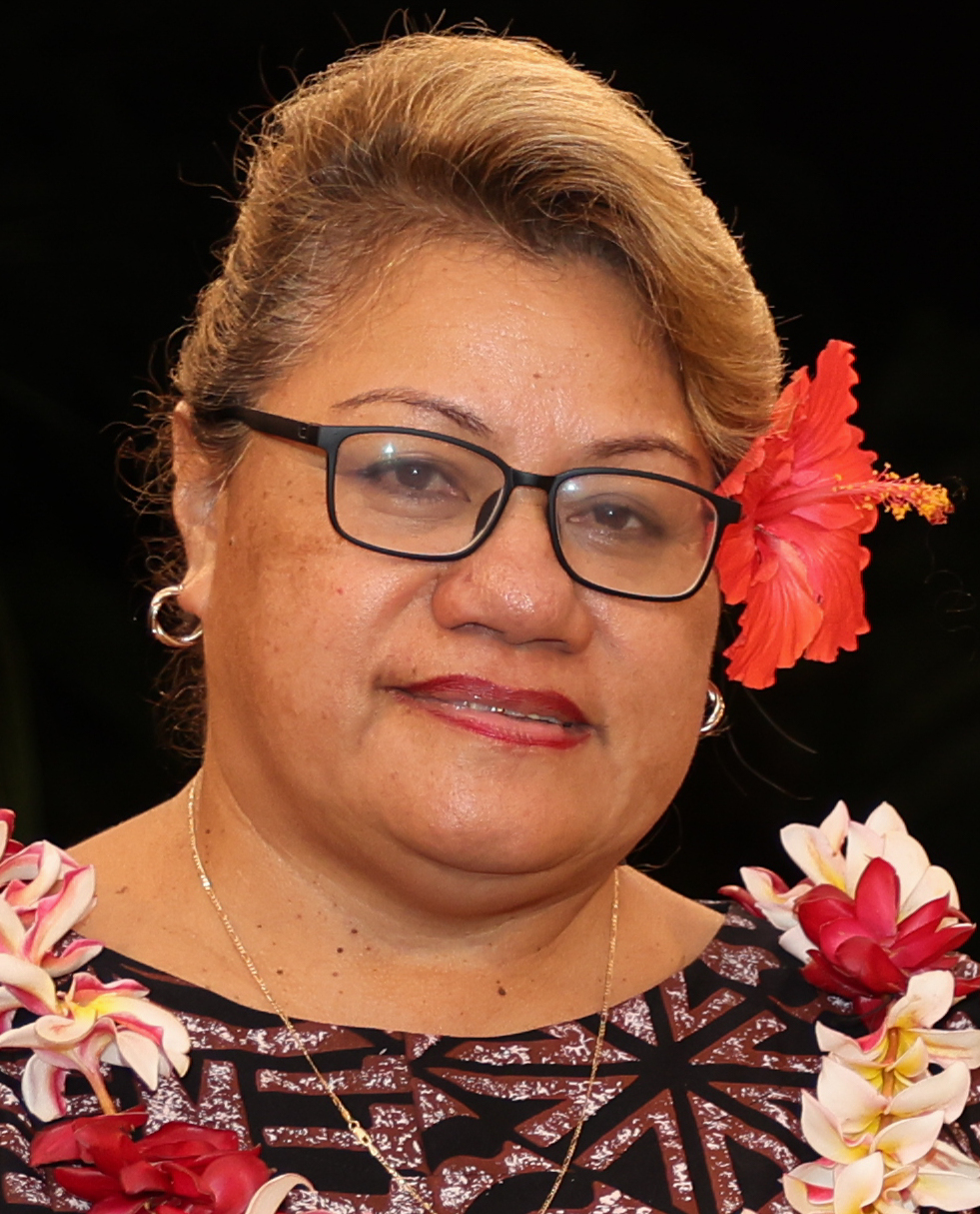

Deputy Prime Minister of Samoa
- Incumbent
- Assumed office 26 May 2026
- Prime Minister: Laʻauli Leuatea Schmidt
- Preceded by: Toelupe Poumulinuku Onesemo
Other cabinet posts
Minister of Finance
Incumbent
Assumed office 16 September 2025
Prime Minister	Laʻauli Leuatea Schmidt
Preceded by	Lautimuia Uelese Vaʻai
In office 24 May 2021 – 1 October 2023 (Note: Disputed: 24 May – 23 July 2021)
Prime Minister	Fiamē Naomi Mataʻafa
Preceded by	Sili Epa Tuioti
Succeeded by	Lautimuia Uelese Vaʻai
Minister of Women, Community and Social Development
In office 1 October 2023 – 14 January 2025
Prime Minister	Fiamē Naomi Mataʻafa
Preceded by	Leota Laki Lamositele
Succeeded by	Lagaaia Tiatuau Tufuga

Member of the Samoan Parliament for Palauli 1
- Incumbent
- Assumed office 24 May 2021
- Preceded by: Afoa Amituanai Faleulu Mauli

Personal details
- Party: Faʻatuatua i le Atua Samoa ua Tasi

Mulipola Anarosa Ale Molioʻo (born ~1968) is a Samoan politician who has served as Deputy Prime Minister of Samoa since 2026. She concurrently serves as finance minister, and is the first woman to hold the post. Molioʻo is a member of the Faʻatuatua i le Atua Samoa ua Tasi (FAST) party.

Mulipola is from the village of Siutu and was active in bringing gender-equality to her village council. She previously worked as an auditor and deputy country manager for Western Union. She was first elected to the Legislative Assembly of Samoa in the 2021 Samoan general election. On 24 May 2021 she was appointed Minister of Finance in the elected cabinet of Fiamē Naomi Mataʻafa. The appointment was disputed by the caretaker government. On 23 July 2021 the Court of Appeal ruled that the swearing-in ceremony was constitutional and binding, and that FAST had been the government since 24 May.

In August 2021 in response to opposition claims that she had sought advice from New Zealand on an upcoming budget, Mulipola suggested that she lacked confidence in Ministry of Finance chief executive Leasiosiofa’asisina Oscar Malielegaoi, opposition leader Tuilaʻepa Saʻilele Malielegaoi's son, as his family connection to the opposition created a perceived conflict of interest. On 27 August Mulipola called reports that Malielegaoi had been fired "misinformation". The next day Malielegaoi resigned, saying that the Minister had demanded his resignation. On 28 August Mulipola issued a statement saying that Malielegaoi's conflict of interest was not sustainable and that she had "reluctantly decided to accept his resignation".

In a cabinet reshuffle on 6 September 2023 she was replaced as Minister of Finance by Lautimuia Uelese Vaʻai. Mulipola was instead appointed Minister of Women, Community and Social Development, replacing Leota Laki Lamositele from 1 October 2023.

On 14 January 2025 she was sacked by Prime Minister Fiamē Naomi Mataʻafa. She was replaced by Lagaaia Tiatuau Tufuga.

During the 2025 snap election, Molio‘o was re-elected to the Palauli 1 seat with 43% of the vote. FAST went on to win the election and formed a government under Prime Minister Laʻauli Leuatea Schmidt, and Molioʻo again became finance minister, assuming the role on 16 September. Per an agreement, she was to assume the role of deputy prime minister midway through the parliamentary term in 2028, allowing Toelupe Poumulinuku Onesemo to hold the role first. After Onesemo was convicted of bribery, however, Molioʻo instead became deputy prime minister on 26 May 2026.

== Notes ==
Legislative Assembly of Samoa
Preceded by Afoa Amituanai Faleulu Mauli	Member of Parliament for Palauli No. 1; 2021–present	Incumbent
Political offices
Preceded by Sili Epa Tuioti	Minister of Finance; 2021–2023	Succeeded by Lautimuia Uelese Vaʻai
Preceded by Leota Laki Lamositele	Minister of Women, Community and Social Development; 2021–2025	Succeeded by Lagaaia Tiatuau Tufuga
Preceded by Lautimuia Uelese Vaʻai	Minister of Finance; 2025–present	Incumbent
Vacant Title last held by Toelupe Poumulinuku Onesemo	Deputy Prime Minister of Samoa; 2026–present	Incumbent
