= Auapaʻau Mulipola Aloitafua =

Samoan politician

Auapaʻau Mulipola Aloitafua MP

Speaker of the Legislative Assembly of Samoa
- Incumbent
- Assumed office 16 September 2025
- Deputy: Afamasaga Leone Mati
- Preceded by: Papaliʻi Liʻo Taeu Masipau

Deputy Speaker of the Legislative Assembly of Samoa
- In office 24 May 2021 – 16 September 2025 (Note: Disputed: 24 May 2021 — 23 July 2021)
- Speaker: Papaliʻi Liʻo Taeu Masipau
- Preceded by: Nafoitoa Talaimanu Keti
- Succeeded by: Afamasaga Leone Mati

Member of the Samoan Parliament for Aiga i le Tai
- Incumbent
- Assumed office 9 April 2021
- Preceded by: Laki Mulipola Leiataua

Personal details
- Party: Faʻatuatua i le Atua Samoa ua Tasi

Auapaʻau Mulipola Aloitafua is a Samoan politician who has served as the speaker of the Legislative Assembly of Samoa since 2025. He is a member of the Faʻatuatua i le Atua Samoa ua Tasi (FAST) party.

Aloitafua was educated at Avele College and worked at the Post Office and Polynesian Airlines before running a consultancy service for the Land and Titles Court. He was first elected to the Legislative Assembly of Samoa in the 2021 Samoan general election. On 22 May 2021 he was nominated by FAST as Deputy Speaker. On 24 May he was sworn in during an ad-hoc ceremony after being locked out of Parliament. The appointment was disputed by the caretaker government. On 23 July 2021 the Court of Appeal ruled that the swearing-in ceremony was constitutional and binding, and that FAST had been the government since 24 May.

He was re-elected at the 2025 Samoan general election. Aloitafua became speaker of the Legislative Assembly on 16 September.

== Notes ==
Legislative Assembly of Samoa
Preceded by Laki Mulipola Leiataua	Member of Parliament for Aiga i le Tai; 2021–present	Incumbent
Preceded by Nafoitoa Talaimanu Keti	Deputy Speaker of the Legislative Assembly of Samoa; 2021–2025	Succeeded by Afamasaga Leone Mati
Preceded by Papaliʻi Liʻo Taeu Masipau	Speaker of the Legislative Assembly of Samoa; 2025–present	Incumbent
