= Setefano Cakau =

Fijian rugby union player (born 1978)

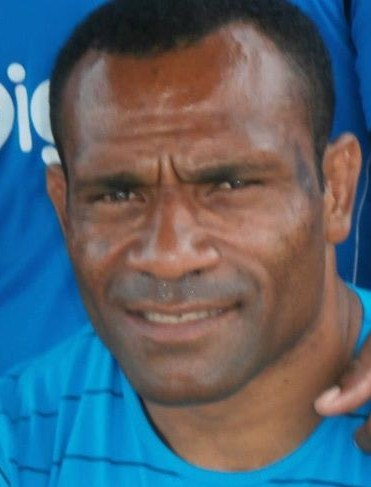

Setefano "Sete" Cakaunivalu (born November 3, 1978) is a Fiji Rugby union player. He plays for Prisons club in the BP Oil sevens series competition which is one of the biggest sporting events in Fiji, similar to the IRB Sevens World Series, and has also been included in the Fiji Sevens team.

In the Fifteens version of the game, he plays as a Flanker and has represented Namosi several times in the Digicel Cup and he also plays for the Coastal Stallions in the Colonial Cup.

Cakau turned out for Jaffna Challengers in Sri Lanka's Carlton Sevens Tournament in 2012.

He currently turns out for Navy Sports Club in the Sri Lankan Premier Rugby League whose team is captained by Yoshitha Rajapakse the Sri Lankan Rugby Captain and son of the Sri Lankan President. He is playing his trade in Sri Lanka as a first inside Centre and his combination with fellow Fijian Taniela Rawaqa has made the side a strong force.

== Career highlights ==
- Fiji Sevens 2003–present
- Prisons club 2002, 2007
- IRB Sevens World Series - 2003, 2006, 2007, 2008
- Jaffna Challengers, Sri Lanka Carlton Sevens Champions 2012
