= Alaiasa Sepulona Moananu =

Samoan politician

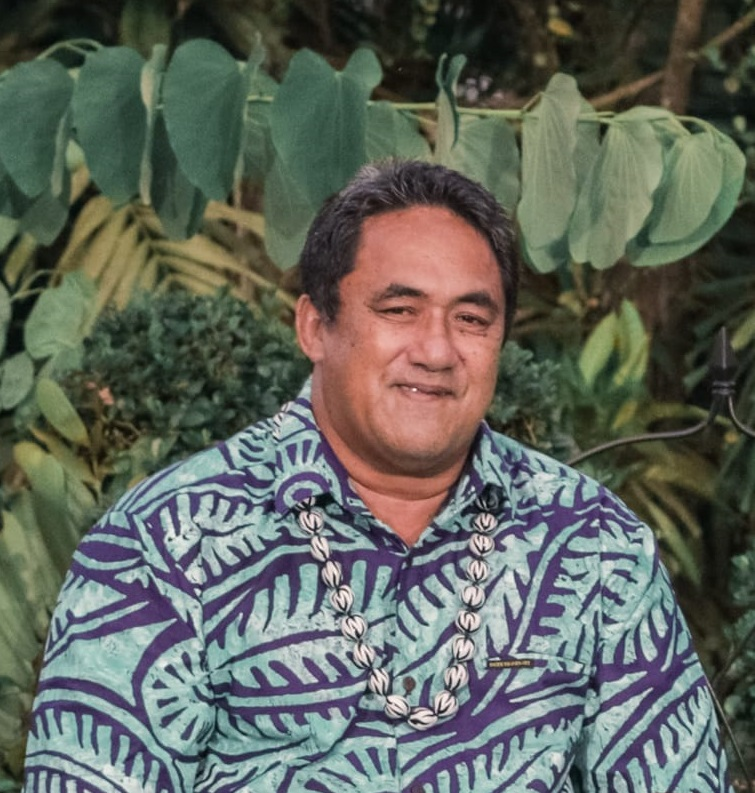
- Alaiasa Sepulona Moananu

Member of the Samoa Parliament for Anoamaa No. 1
- In office 4 March 2016 – 29 August 2025
- Preceded by: Alo Fulifuli Taveuveu
- Succeeded by: Moefaauouo Julius Tafunai

Member of the Samoa Parliament for Salega
- In office 31 March 2006 – 4 March 2011
- Succeeded by: None (Constituency split)

Personal details
- Party: Human Rights Protection Party

Alai'asa Moefa'auouo Tapuai Sepulona Moananu (born c. 1961) is a former Samoan politician. He was a member of the Opposition Human Rights Protection Party and served as party whip.

== Personal life ==
Sepulona Moananu was born and raised in the village of Falefa to parents Salale Moananu Salale and Eseta Moananu. He is an accountant, a business owner, a farmer, and comes from a family of politicians and leaders. He holds the matai titles of "Tapuai" from Sagone in Savaii, "Moefa'auouo" from the village of Lufilufi and "Alai'asa" from Falefa. His father the late Salale Moananu was elected as MP for Anoama'a in the 1991 election, defeating former Prime Minister Tui Atua Tupua Tamasese Efi before losing the seat in a subsequent case. Alai'asa has 7 siblings (Siaosi, Sinatala, Pola Salale, Makerita Litia, Okesene Lupe, Tapa, and Saulaulu Utulei) and is a father to 7 children (Lapi, Grace, Esther, Timothy Salale, Faith, Christian, and Lydia) and husband to Fugalelea Moananu.

== Political career ==
He was first elected to the Legislative Assembly of Samoa in the seat of Salega in the 2006 election under the title of Tapuai. He lost his seat at the 2011 election, but was re-elected as the Member for Anoamaa No. 1 in the 2016 election and appointed Government Whip and Associate Minister of Education, Sports and Culture (MESC). In January 2017 during a debate over a constitutional amendment to declare Samoa a Christian nation, Moananu urged Samoa to back the state of Israel.

He was re-elected in the 2021 election.

In May 2025 he abstained on the budget vote which saw the collapse of Fiamē Naomi Mataʻafa's government. He lost his seat in the 2025 Samoan general election.
