= 2023 Vaʻa-o-Fonoti by-election =

- 15 September 2023
	First party	Second party
Candidate	Mauʻu Siaosi Puʻepuʻemai	Leausa Take Naseri
Party	FAST	HRPP
Popular vote	772	226
Percentage	74.95%	21.94%
MP before election
Mauʻu Siaosi Puʻepuʻemai
Independent
Elected MP
Mauʻu Siaosi Puʻepuʻemai
FAST

A by-election was held in the Vaʻa-o-Fonoti constituency in Samoa on 15 September 2023. The by-election was triggered by the resignation of the incumbent member Mauʻu Siaosi Puʻepuʻemai from the Human Rights Protection Party (HRPP) in order to become an independent in November 2022. Following a protracted court battle, the seat was declared vacant in July 2023. Mau‘u subsequently joined the Faʻatuatua i le Atua Samoa ua Tasi (FAST) party and ran against two other candidates: former director-general of health Leausa Take Naseri for the HRPP and Feutagaʻiimealelei Osovale Brown of the newly founded Constitution Democracy Republic Party (CDRP). Mauʻu achieved a landslide victory, reclaiming the seat with 74% of the vote, while the HRPP candidate, who placed second, received 21%. As a result of FAST winning Vaʻa-o-Fonoti and the simultaneous Faleata No. 4 and Siʻumu by-elections, the party gained a parliamentary two-thirds majority.

== Background ==
During the previous general election, held in 2021, businessman Mauʻu Siaosi Puʻepuʻemai of the HRPP won the constituency by a sizeable margin, taking 63% of the vote. He defeated four other candidates: two fellow HRPP members, one from FAST and one independent.

In November 2022, Mauʻu resigned from the HRPP shortly after fellow MPs Ale Vena Ale and Tuʻuʻu Anasiʻi Leota had done so. Mau‘u left the party, citing the request of his constituents, with many of the opinion that if he remained with the HRPP, he could do little to alleviate the challenges the constituency faces from being one of the most isolated in Samoa. Under the electoral act, members of parliament who change their affiliation during a parliamentary term trigger a by-election in their constituency. The law was passed shortly before the 2021 general election by the HRPP government, allegedly to prevent members from defecting. Mau‘u, along with the two other former HRPP MPs, challenged the law in court. When they refused to vacate their seats as ordered by parliamentary Speaker Papaliʻi Liʻo Taeu Masipau, the speaker pursued legal action against the trio. In July 2023, the trio agreed to relinquish their seats in exchange for the speaker withdrawing the legal challenge, triggering the by-elections.

== Candidates ==
The Office of the Electoral Commission (OEC) scheduled 24 to 25 August for individuals to register their candidacy; three candidates registered. The OEC designated 31 August as the deadline for candidates to withdraw if they intend to. The governing FAST party fielded the previous representative, Mauʻu Siaosi Puʻepuʻemai, who joined the party in July 2023, while the opposition HRPP nominated the former director-general of health, Leausa Take Naseri. The newly founded Constitution Democracy Republic Party (CDRP), which the OEC registered shortly before the closure of nominations, fielded Feutagaʻiimealelei Osovale Brown.

== Conduct ==
The OEC updated the constituency's electoral in the lead-up to the announcement of the polling date on 19 August. The roll closed with 1,670 voters enrolled, a slight decrease from the 1,672 in the 2021 general election. The OEC designated pre-polling to occur on 13 September and scheduled the return of the writ for 18 September. Individuals eligible to vote on the pre-polling day included essential workers, senior citizens over 65 and individuals with a disability; only 26 voters applied to cast an early ballot. On pre-polling day, voting opened at 9:00 and concluded at 16:00 local time (UTC+13). On the by-election day, voting commenced at 8:00 and concluded at 15:00 (UTC+13). A preliminary count subsequently began, while an official count took place the following day.

== Results ==
Preliminary results showed a landslide victory for Mauʻu, who received 739 votes to HRPP candidate Leausa Take Naseri's 201, while the CDRP's Feutagaʻiimealelei Osovale Brown placed a distant third with 32 votes. In the official result, Mauʻu's majority increased to 772, 74% of the vote, Leausa received a final tally of 226, 21% and Feutagaʻiimealelei's share remained unchanged from the preliminary count, garnering 3%. Just over 61% of Vaʻa-o-Fonoti's enrolled voters participated in the by-election. Alongside the victorious FAST candidates in the two concurrent by-elections in the Faleata No. 4 and Siʻumu constituencies, Mauʻu's win gave FAST a parliamentary two-thirds majority, an increase to 35 seats.

Candidate	Party	Votes	%
Mauʻu Siaosi Puʻepuʻemai	Faʻatuatua i le Atua Samoa ua Tasi	772	74.95
Leausa Take Naseri	Human Rights Protection Party	226	21.94
Feutagaʻiimealelei Osovale Brown	Constitution Democracy Republic Party	32	3.11
Total		1,030	100.00
Registered voters/turnout		1,670	–
Source: Samoa Observer
