= Laki Mulipola Leiataua =

Samoan politician

Member of the Samoa Parliament for Aiga i le Tai
- In office 4 March 2016 – 9 April 2021
- Preceded by: Ifopo Matia Filisi
- Succeeded by: Auapaau Mulipola Aloitafua

Personal details
- Party: Human Rights Protection Party

Laki Mulipola Leiataua (born ~1970) is a Samoan politician and former member of the Legislative Assembly of Samoa. He is a member of the Human Rights Protection Party.

Mulipola is from Salua on Manono Island. He was educated at Salua Manono Primary School, A’ana Secondary School, Samoa College and the National University of Samoa. He worked as a customs agent for nine years before starting his own freight forwarding business. In 2015 he was convicted and discharged of negligent driving causing death after a traffic incident. He was first elected to the Legislative Assembly of Samoa in the 2016 Samoan general election and appointed Associate Minister of Finance.

He sought nomination for the 2021 election, but it was refused on the basis that his 2015 conviction made him ineligible to stand. He subsequently withdrew a petition challenging this decision and retired from parliament at the end of the term. In his final speech, he complained that the FAST Party campaigning in his electorate had caused him "sleepless nights".
