= Ili Setefano Taʻateo =

Samoan politician

Ili Setefano Taʻateo Tafili

Member of the Samoan Parliament for Aana Alofi No. 2
- In office 4 March 2016 – 9 April 2021
- Preceded by: Tolofuaivalelei Falemoe Leiʻataua
- Succeeded by: Aiono Afaese Toleafoa

Personal details
- Party: Tautua Samoa Party; Human Rights Protection Party

Ili Setefano Taʻateo Tafili is a Samoan politician and matai. He is a member of the Tautua Samoa Party.

He was first elected to the Legislative Assembly of Samoa at the 2016 election, defeating Minister of Women's Affairs Tolofuaivalelei Falemoe Leiʻataua to win the constituency of Aana Alofi No. 2, becoming one of only three Tautua MP's.

In April 2020 he revealed that he was facing pressure from his constituents to switch his support to the Human Rights Protection Party (HRPP). He ran as an independent in the 2021 election and was defeated. A subsequent electoral petition saw him convicted of two counts of bribery.
