= Samoa Tourism Authority =

Tourism in Samoa

Samoa Tourism Authority (STA)
- Company type: State-owned enterprise (owned by the Government of Samoa)
- Industry: Tourism
- Predecessor: Samoa Visitors Bureau
- Founded: 1986
- Headquarters: Apia, Samoa
- Key people: Tuilaepa Sailele Malielegaoi (Prime Minister & Minister of Tourism); Sonja Hunter (Chief Executive Officer)
- Products: Information Products and Services, Marketing Services, Development Services
- Website: www.samoa.travel

The Samoa Tourism Authority (STA) is a state-owned enterprise responsible for the marketing of Samoa as a holiday destination and the sustainable development of new and existing tourism products in the country.

== History ==
The authority was established as the Samoa Visitors Bureau in 1986 following the passing of the Western Samoa Visitors Bureau Act in 1984. The change of name to 'Samoa Tourism Authority' in 2002 was a shift to emphasize the broader concept of tourism.

== Organisation Structure and Information ==
The STA's main office is located on the ground floor of the FMFMII Government Building in the Apia central business district. It also operates the Visitor Information Centre on main Beach Road (opposite the Catholic Cathedral) and Information Booth at the Faleolo International Airport. STA has Market Representative Offices in New Zealand, Australia and UK/Europe.

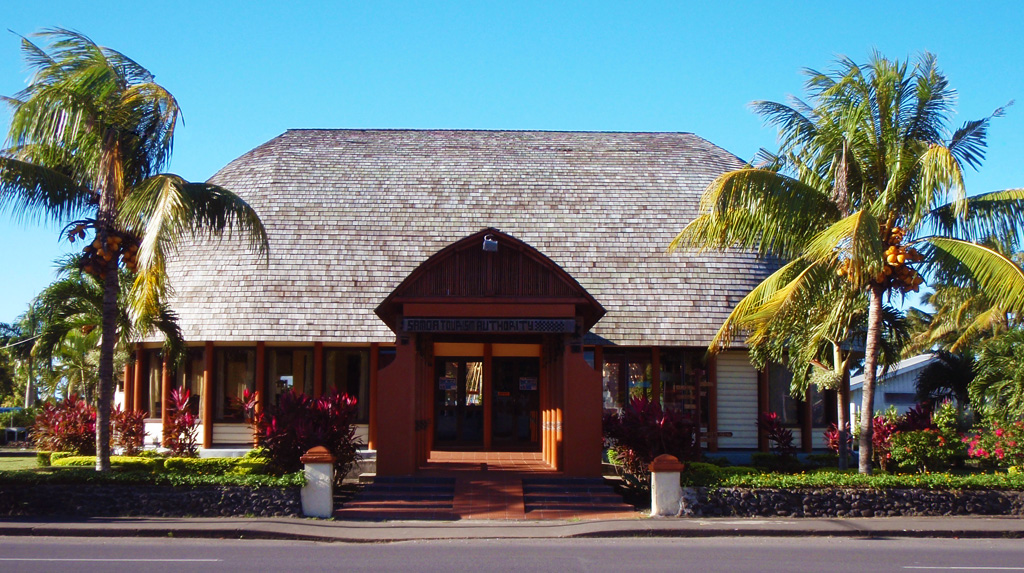
The Samoa Tourism Authority Visitor Information Center, Matafele, Apia, Samoa

There are four core divisions of the STA, namely Marketing & Promotions, Planning & Development, Research & Statistics and Policy. The Finance & Corporate Services division provides the necessary administrative support services. Tuilaepa Sailele Malielegaoi is the current Minister of Tourism.

== Community Activities ==
The STA plays a key role in the National Beautification Committee. It also coordinates the annual Teuila Festival, as well as the Miss Samoa Pageant in collaboration with Manaia Events.
