= Aiono Afaese Toleafoa =

Samoan politician

Member of the Samoan Parliament for Aana Alofi No. 2
- In office 9 April 2021 – 16 August 2021
- Preceded by: Leaupepe Toleafoa Faafisi
- Succeeded by: Aiono Tile Gafa

Personal details
- Party: Human Rights Protection Party
- Relations: Leaupepe Toleafoa Faafisi (father)

Aiono Afaese Toleafoa is a Samoan politician. He is a member of the Human Rights Protection Party.

Toleafoa is the son of former Speaker and MP Leaupepe Toleafoa Faafisi. He was first elected to the Legislative Assembly of Samoa in the April 2021 Samoan general election, winning his father's seat of Aana Alofi No. 2. Before entering politics, he managed the Toleafoa Company, operating supermarkets, petrol stations and public transport. On 12 July 2021, he agreed to resign from parliament and agreed not to contest the resulting by-election as part of the settlement of an election petition. On 13 July, he changed his mind, and the petition will now proceed to trial. On 16 August 2021, his election was voided after he was found guilty of five counts of bribery and treating.
