= Aumua Isaia Lameko =

Samoan politician

Member of the Samoa Parliament for Falealili West
- In office 4 March 2016 – 9 April 2021
- Preceded by: None (Seat established)
- Succeeded by: Toelupe Poumulinuku Onesemo

Personal details
- Party: Human Rights Protection Party

Aumua Isaia Lameko is a Samoan politician and former Member of the Legislative Assembly of Samoa. He is a member of the Human Rights Protection Party. He is the son of former Cabinet Minister and member of the Council of Deputies Tuiloma Pule Lameko.

Lameko was first elected to the Fono in the 2016 Samoan general election. Shortly after his election, he was charged with negligent driving causing injury over an incident in January 2016 where a child was injured. The charge was subsequently withdrawn.

In June 2020 Lameko called for higher maternity leave entitlements for private sector workers.

He lost his seat at the April 2021 Samoan general election.
