= Leaupepe Toleafoa Faafisi =

Samoan politician

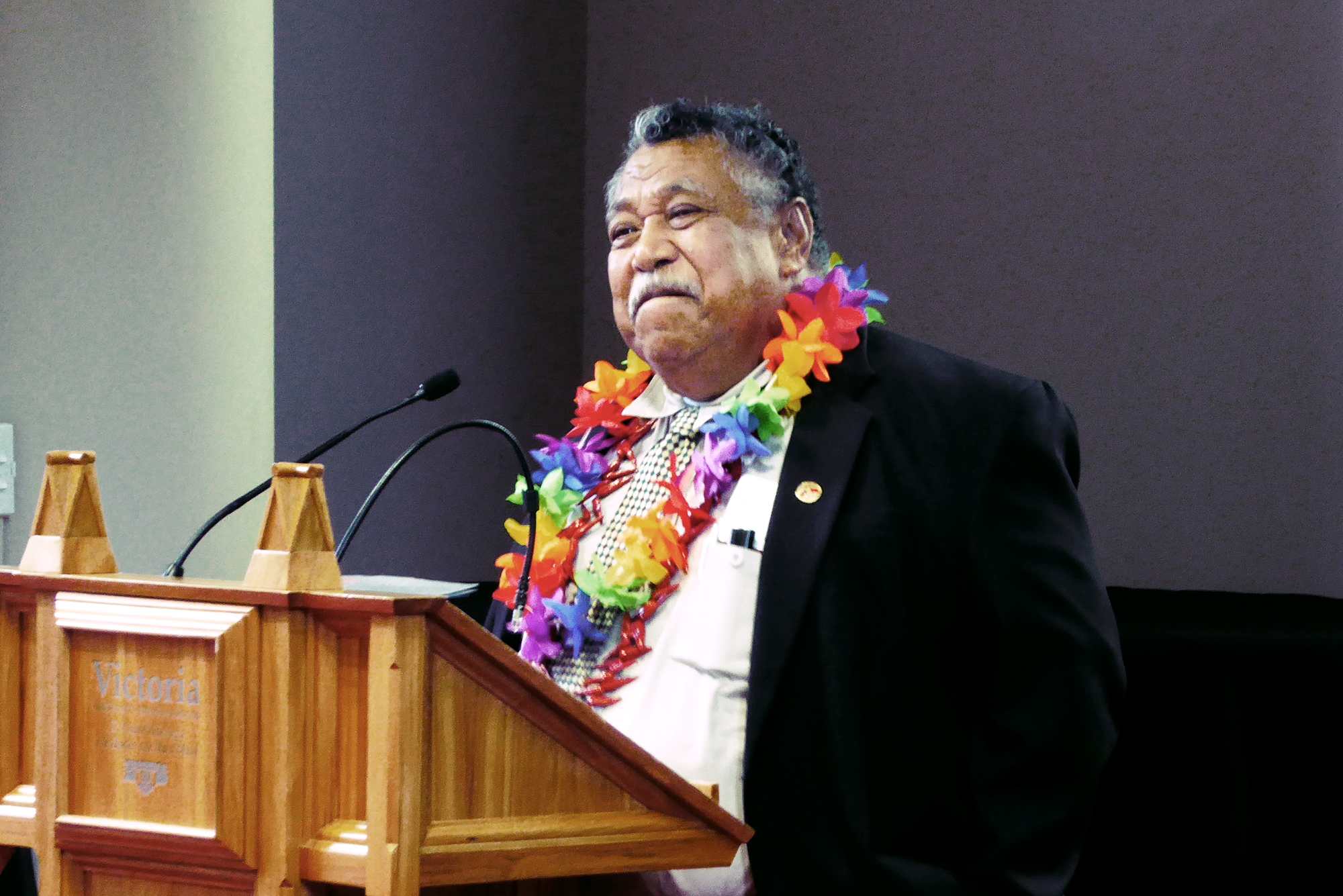
- Faafisi in 2017

Speaker of the Legislative Assembly of Samoa
- In office 18 March 2016 – 9 April 2021
- Prime Minister: Tuilaepa Aiono Sailele Malielegaoi
- Deputy: Nafoitoa Talaimanu Keti
- Preceded by: Laauli Leuatea Polataivao
- Succeeded by: Papali’i Li’o Taeu Masipau
- In office 1996–2006
- Prime Minister: Tofilau Eti Alesana; Tuilaepa Aiono Sailele Malielegaoi
- Deputy: Tolofuaivalelei Falemoe Leiʻataua
- Preceded by: Fatu Vaili Afamasaga
- Succeeded by: Tolofuaivalelei Falemoe Leiʻataua

Minister of Police and Prisons
- In office 24 April 2006 – 21 March 2011
- Preceded by: Ulu Vaomalo Kini
- Succeeded by: Sala Fata Pinati

Deputy Speaker of the Legislative Assembly of Samoa
- In office 1991–1996
- Preceded by: Tuilagi Vavae

Member of the Samoan Parliament for A'ana Alofi No. 1 West
- In office 5 April 1991 – 9 April 2021
- Preceded by: Leaupepe Uili
- Succeeded by: Aiono Afaese Toleafoa

Personal details
- Born: Leaupepe Toleafoa Apulu Faafisi circa 1947
- Party: Samoan National Development Party; Human Rights Protection Party

Leaupepe Toleafoa Apulu Faafisi (born c.1947) is a Samoan politician. He has served as a Cabinet Minister and as Speaker of the Legislative Assembly of Samoa. He is a member of the Human Rights Protection Party (HRPP).

Faafisi was first elected to the Legislative Assembly of Samoa at the 1991 Samoan general election as a candidate for the Samoan National Development Party. He switched allegiance to the HRPP immediately after the election, and was appointed Deputy Speaker. In 1996 he was appointed Speaker of the Legislative Assembly. In 1998 he was hospitalised while attending the Commonwealth Speakers and Clerks Conference in Port of Spain, Trinidad and Tobago.

Following his re-election in 2001, he was appointed to the role for a second term.

He was re-elected at the 2006 election and appointed to Cabinet as Minister of Police. He was not reappointed to Cabinet in 2011. In 2013 he advocated exporting dog meat to China as a measure for controlling stray animals.

In 2016, he was elected Speaker of the Legislative Assembly for a third term. As Speaker he oversaw the redevelopment of the new Parliament building. As Speaker, he was accused of lacking independence, of removing Members' speeches from Hansard, and of taking direction in the House from Prime Minister Tuilaepa Aiono Sailele Malielegaoi. in November 2020, he declared the seats of independent opposition MPs Olo Fiti Vaai and Faumuina Asi Pauli Wayne Fong vacant after they announced they would be standing as candidates for the F.A.S.T. party at the 2021 election. On 14 December 2020 the decision was declared unlawful and invalid by the Supreme Court of Samoa.

Faafisi retired at the April 2021 election. He was succeeded as MP in his electorate (now renamed Aana Alofi No. 2) by his son, Aiono Afaese Toleafoa.

On 23 May 2021, during the 2021 Samoan constitutional crisis, Faafisi purported to cancel the first meeting of the new legislative assembly, in violation of an order from the Supreme Court.

Legislative Assembly of Samoa
Preceded by Leaupepe Uili	Member of Parliament for A'ana Alofi No. 1 West; 1991–2021	Succeeded by Aiono Afaese Toleafoa
Preceded by Fatu Vaili Afamasaga	Speaker of the Legislative Assembly of Samoa; 1996–2006	Succeeded by Tolofuaivalelei Falemoe Leiʻataua
Preceded by La'auli Leuatea Polataivao	Speaker of the Legislative Assembly of Samoa; 2016–2021	Succeeded by Papali’i Li’o Taeu Masipau
Political offices
Preceded by Ulu Vaomalo Kini	Minister of Police and Prisons; 2006–2011	Succeeded by Sala Fata Pinati
