= Ale Vena Ale =

Samoan politician

Member of the Samoan Parliament
- Incumbent
- Assumed office 24 October 2023
- Preceded by: Vacant
- Constituency: Faleata No. 4
- In office 9 April 2021 – 19 July 2023
- Preceded by: Constituency established
- Succeeded by: Vacant
- Constituency: Faleata No. 4
- In office 14 May 2010 – 4 March 2011
- Preceded by: Lealaʻilepule Rimoni Aiafi
- Succeeded by: Lealaʻilepule Rimoni Aiafi
- Constituency: Faleata West

Personal details
- Born: 1951 or 1952 (age 74–75)
- Party: Faʻatuatua i le Atua Samoa ua Tasi (since 2023); Independent (2022-2023); Human Rights Protection Party (until 2022)

Ale Vena Ale (born 1951/1952) is a Samoan politician and member of the Legislative Assembly of Samoa. He is a founding member of the Human Rights Protection Party.

Ale had previously served as an MP and as Public Service Commissioner. He was re-elected to the Legislative Assembly at the 2010 Faleata West by-election. He lost his seat at the 2011 Samoan general election.

Ale unsuccessfully contested the 2016 election. Following the election, he filed an unsuccessful election petition against the winning candidate.

He was re-elected in the new seat of Faleata No. 4 at the 2021 Samoan general election. Following the election he was the HRPP's choice for Deputy Speaker. Following the 2021 Samoan constitutional crisis he called for a full review of the constitution to grant greater powers to the O le Ao o le Malo.

In June 2022 Ale revealed that he was unhappy with the leadership of the HRPP and wanted to become an independent. He later urged HRPP leader Tuila'epa Sa'ilele Malielegaoi to step down as leader. Most of Ale's constituents supported his exit from the party, with one of Ale's former campaign managers saying that he expressed dissatisfaction with the HRPP in private for a while. Ale expressed frustration towards Tuila'epa's poor responses to the HRPP's defeat in the 2021 general election to the newly formed Faʻatuatua i le Atua Samoa ua Tasi party, the disappointing showing at the 2021 by-elections and the failure to win subsequent legal challenges. Ale stated, "Those are the signs, and Tuilaʻepa knows it, but his refusal to even entertain any advice is taking its toll on the party members". Ale has not yet been able to leave the HRPP immediately due to a law passed in early 2021, in which if a member of parliament left their respective party to become an independent, a by-election would take place in their constituency. Ale subsequently began working with his lawyer to find a path to leave the HRPP without having to compete in a by-election to retain his seat. He admitted that the HRPP passed the law due to fears that many party caucus members would defect, as Deputy Prime minister Fiamē Naomi Mataʻafa had done shortly before. He described the law as "discriminatory". HRPP members were reportedly surprised by Ale's statements, prompting Tuilaʻepa to hold an emergency press conference. The HRPP leader responded to Ale's comments by urging him to remember how he entered parliament when his predecessor Lealaʻilepule Rimoni Aiafi refused to retract his support for a party he was not a member of, triggering a by-election.

On 3 November 2022 Ale and fellow MP Tuʻuʻu Anasiʻi Leota resigned from the HRPP to become independents, saying they did not want to remain in a party led by a leader guilty of contempt of court. Following a court challenge, their seats were declared vacant on 19 July 2023. Ale said he would run as a FAST candidate in the resulting by-election.

He was re-elected as a FAST candidate in the 2023 Faleata No. 4 by-election, and was sworn back into parliament on 24 October 2023.

On 17 January 2025 he was fired as an associate minister by prime minister Fiamē Naomi Mataʻafa after supporting her expulsion from the FAST party.

He contested the 2025 Samoan general election as a FAST candidate and was re-elected.

Legislative Assembly of Samoa
Preceded by Lealaʻilepule Rimoni Aiafi	Member of Parliament for Faleata West; 2010–2011	Succeeded by Lealaʻilepule Rimoni Aiafi
New constituency	Member of Parliament for Faleata No. 4; 2021–2023	Vacant Title next held by Himself
Vacant Title last held by Himself	Member of Parliament for Faleata No. 4; 2023–present	Incumbent
