= Lealaʻilepule Rimoni Aiafi =

Samoan politician

Lealaʻilepule Rimoni Aiafi MP
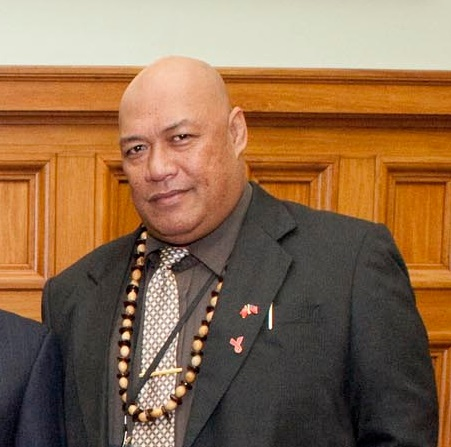
- Lealaʻilepule Rimoni Aiafi in 2013

Member of the Samoan Parliament
- Incumbent
- Assumed office 9 April 2021 (Note: Suspended 24 May 2022 - 4 July 2023)
- Preceded by: Constituency established
- Constituency: Faleata 3
- In office 4 March 2011 – 9 April 2021
- Preceded by: Ale Vena Ale
- Succeeded by: Constituency abolished
- Constituency: Faleata West
- In office 31 March 2006 – 14 May 2010
- Preceded by: Ulu Vaomalo Kini
- Succeeded by: Ale Vena Ale
- Constituency: Faleata West

Chair of the Tautua Samoa Party
- Interim
- In office 17 December 2008 – 22 December 2010
- Preceded by: Party established
- Succeeded by: Vaʻai Papu Vailupe (as leader)

Personal details
- Born: April 1967 (age 59)
- Party: Human Rights Protection Party (since 2016)
- Other political affiliations: Tautua Samoa Party (2008–2016)

Lealaʻilepule Rimoni Aiafi (born April 1967) is a Samoan politician and member of the Legislative Assembly of Samoa. He is the founder of the Tautua Samoa Party.

Aiafi was first elected to Parliament at the 2006 Samoan general election, representing Faleata West (Faleata i Sisifo) as an independent. He had previously been chief executive of the Samoan airport authority, and won election with 795 votes, 165 more than his rival, the former minister of police.

As an independent, Aiafi campaigned against the planned government sale of the public broadcaster Radio 2AP. Since the formation of Tautua Samoa, he has also expressed doubts about the ability of the police commissioner to function in office following a damaging Commission of Inquiry Report, and called for the release on parole of former cabinet minister Toi Aukuso, jailed in the 1990s for the murder of Minister of Works Luagalau Levaula Kamu.

In November 2008, Aiafi was one of twelve (later whittled down to nine) MPs from the Samoan opposition to form a new political party, the Tautua Samoa Party. Like the other Tautua Samoa members, Aiafi registered as an independent MP to avoid the constitutional requirement to contest a by-election on changing parties. The party was in January 2009 ordered to formally notify the Speaker of its existence and membership. Establishing the party, Aiafi expressed his intention to form a stronger and more effective opposition to the ruling Human Rights Protection Party. In May 2009, Speaker Tolofuaivalelei Falemoe Leiʻataua revoked the parliamentary membership of all nine of the party's MPs, on the grounds that joining a party after being elected "breached the provisions of the Electoral Act and the parliament standing orders". The expulsion was later overturned by the courts.

In March 2010, Aiafi was deemed to have resigned from Parliament under anti-party-hopping laws after refusing to deny his support for Tautua Samoa. He was defeated in the resulting by-election. He was re-elected at the 2011 election and appointed the Tautua Party's whip. During this term he opposed the creation of reserved seats for women and called for life imprisonment for drug smugglers.

In February 2016 he announced that he was leaving the Tautua Samoa party and would run as a Human Rights Protection Party candidate in the 2016 election. He was successfully re-elected, and appointed Associate Minister of Communications. As Associate Minister he accused the United Nations of promoting same-sex marriage and called for bloggers critical of the government to be hunted down.

Aiafi ran again at the 2021 election and was elected unopposed.

On 31 January 2022 Aiafi was suspended from parliament for 24 hours for making "misleading" public comments about a parliamentary investigation into the passage of the Land and Titles Bill and the Speaker's refusal to swear in MPs elected under the women's quota following the 2021 Samoan by-elections.

On 23 March 2022 he was convicted alongside Tuilaʻepa Saʻilele Malielegaoi of scandalising the court for his attacks on the judiciary during and following the 2021 Samoan constitutional crisis. On 24 May 2022 both were suspended indefinitely from the Legislative Assembly after the Privileges Committee found that they had bought parliament into disrepute. On 30 August, the supreme court ruled the suspension to be unconstitutional.

The privileges and ethics committee subsequently reviewed Malielegaoi's case and recommended that he and Aiafi be re-suspended without pay for 24 months. The legislative assembly then approved the committee's motion on 19 October, with all present FAST members and one from the HRPP voting for it. On 4 July 2023 the Supreme Court ruled that Malielegaoi and Aiafi's suspension was unconstitutional and void.

Malielegaoi was re-elected in the 2025 election.

In March 2026 the FAST government convened a special parliamentary committee to investigate Malielegaoi, Tuila‘epa, and HRPP deputy leader Fonotoe Pierre Lauofo on allegations of treason and defamation over the 2021 Samoan constitutional crisis and more recent statements criticising the government.

== Notes ==
Legislative Assembly of Samoa
Preceded by Ulu Vaomalo Kini	Member of Parliament for Faleata West; 2006–2010	Succeeded by Ale Vena Ale
Preceded by Ale Vena Ale	Member of Parliament for Faleata West; 2011–2021	Constituency abolished
New constituency	Member of Parliament for Faleata 3; 2021–present	Incumbent
Party political offices
New political party	Interim Chair of the Tautua Samoa Party; 2008–2010	Succeeded by Vaʻai Papu Vailupe as Leader
