= Sili Epa Tuioti =

Samoan politician

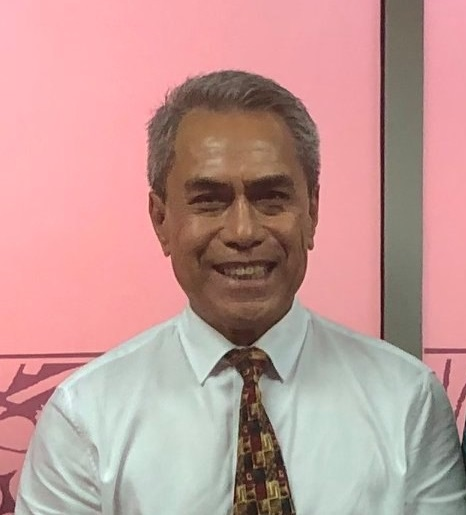
- Tuioti in 2020

Minister of Finance
- In office 18 March 2016 – 9 April 2021
- Prime Minister: Tuilaepa Aiono Sailele Malielegaoi
- Preceded by: Tuilaepa Aiono Sailele Malielegaoi
- Succeeded by: Mulipola Anarosa Ale Molioo

Member of the Samoa Parliament for Faasaleleaga No. 1 East
- In office 4 March 2016 – 9 April 2021
- Preceded by: Magele Mauiliu Magele
- Succeeded by: Matamua Vasati Pulufana

Personal details
- Party: Human Rights Protection Party

Sili Epa Tuioti is a Samoan politician and former Cabinet Minister. He is a member of the Human Rights Protection Party.

Tuioti studied for two years at Rhema Bible Training school. He is a former career public servant who served as Head of Treasury from 1991 to 1999. He later worked as a consultant. He was first elected to the Legislative Assembly of Samoa at the 2016 Samoan general election, and appointed Minister of Finance.

Tuioti lost his seat in the April 2021 Samoan general election.
