= Afamasaga Rico Tupa'i =

Samoan politician

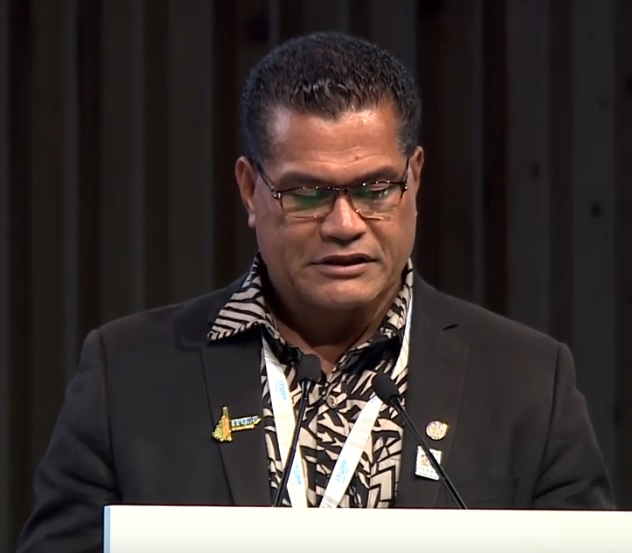
- Tupa'i in 2018

Minister of Communication and Information Technology
- In office 18 March 2016 – 24 May 2021
- Prime Minister: Tuilaepa Aiono Sailele Malielegaoi
- Preceded by: Tuisugaletaua Sofara Aveau
- Succeeded by: Toelupe Poumulinuku Onesemo

Member of the Samoa Parliament for A'ana Alofi No.3
- In office 4 March 2016 – 9 April 2021
- Preceded by: Toeolesulusulu Cedric Schuster
- Succeeded by: Toeolesulusulu Cedric Schuster

Personal details
- Born: Afamasaga Lepuiai Rico Tupa'i c. 1969
- Party: Human Rights Protection Party

Afamasaga Lepuiai Rico Tupa'i (born c. 1969) is a Samoan politician and Cabinet Minister. He is a member of the Human Rights Protection Party.

Tupa'i previously worked in the media, including media agency Skylite, the Samoan Department of Broadcasting, and as one of the founders of Fiji's Mai TV. He worked for Digicel Pacific and the National University of Samoa. He was first elected to the Legislative Assembly of Samoa at the 2016 Samoan general election, and appointed Minister of Communication and Information Technology.

In March 2021, Tupa'i was accused of extracting A$90,000 from an Australian investor seeking to establish a business in Samoa. He subsequently lost his seat in the April 2021 Samoan general election.
