= Tofa Lio Foleni =

Samoan politician

Member of the Samoa Parliament for Faasaleleaga No. 3
- In office 4 March 2016 – 9 April 2021
- Preceded by: Tuileutu Alava'a Voi
- Succeeded by: Tea Tooala Peato

Personal details
- Party: Human Rights Protection Party

Tofa Lio Foleni (born ~1952) is a Samoan politician and former member of the Legislative Assembly of Samoa. He is a member of the Human Rights Protection Party.

Tofa is from the village of Saipipi in Savai'i. He worked for the Ministry of Education for 40 years and as a businessman. He was first elected to the Legislative Assembly in the 2016 Samoan general election and appointed Associate Minister of Women, Community and Social Development. He later became Associate Minister of Health. In June 2020 during the COVID-19 pandemic, he was accused of hosting a gathering at his home in violation of Samoa's emergency regulations. He denied the breach.

He lost his seat in the 2021 election.
