= Paʻu Sefo Paʻu =

Samoan politician (1953–2019)

Paʻu Taumata Sefo Paʻu

Member of the Samoan Parliament for Faasaleleaga No. 2
- In office 4 March 2016 – 19 January 2019
- Preceded by: Papaliʻi Liʻo Taeu Masipau
- Succeeded by: Namulauʻulu Sami Leota
- In office 31 March 2006 – 2 August 2006
- Preceded by: Leanapapa Laki
- Succeeded by: Letoa Rita Paʻu Chang
- In office 2 March 2001 – 2001
- Preceded by: Leanapapa Laki
- Succeeded by: Leanapapa Laki

Personal details
- Born: Letoa Sefo Paʻu Taumata; 14 March 1953
- Died: 19 January 2019 (aged 65) Motoʻotua, Samoa
- Party: Human Rights Protection Party

Paʻu Sefo Paʻu (14 March 1953 — 19 January 2019) (also known as Letoa Sefo Paʻu Taumata) was a Samoan politician. He was a member of the Human Rights Protection Party.

A native of the village of Safotulafai, he was educated at St. Theresa's school in Safotulafai, at Marist Primary, and at St. Joseph's College. After working for ten years for the Ministry of Revenue, he became a businessman, running a bar, a funeral parlour, and a crematorium.

He was first elected to the Legislative Assembly of Samoa in the 2001 election, but his election was voided for bribery in an election petition. He was re-elected at the 2006 election, and again his election was voided for bribery and he was banned from office. The subsequent by-election was won by his daughter Letoa Rita Paʻu Chang, but her election was also overturned for bribery. He was barred from running in the 2011 election, but ran again and was elected in the 2016 election. An election petition against him following the 2016 election was subsequently withdrawn.
