= Faʻaulusau Rosa Duffy-Stowers =

Samoan politician

Member of the Samoa Parliament for Gagaʻifomauga No. 3 (additional)
- In office 4 March 2016 – 9 April 2021
- Preceded by: n/a (additional member)

Personal details
- Born: ~1962
- Party: Human Rights Protection Party

Faʻaulusau Rosa Duffy-Stowers (born ~1962) is a Samoan politician and member of the Legislative Assembly of Samoa. She is a member of the Human Rights Protection Party.

Duffy-Stowers is an accountant from the villages of Letui and Aopo. She was first elected to the Legislative Assembly in the 2016 Samoan general election, becoming the first female MP elected as an additional MP under a constitutional amendment to guarantee that 10% of Parliament are women. She lost her seat in the 2021 election.
