= Tuifaʻasisina Misa Lisati =

Samoan politician

Member of the Samoan Parliament for Palauli East
- In office 4 March 2016 – 9 April 2021
- Preceded by: Afoafouvale John Moors
- Succeeded by: Lagaaia Tiatuau Tufuga

Personal details
- Party: Human Rights Protection Party

Tuifaʻasisina Misa Lisati Leleisiuao Palemene is a Samoan politician and former member of the Samoan Parliament. He is a member of the Human Rights Protection Party.

Lisati first ran for parliament in the 2011 Samoan general election, losing by 17 votes. He was elected in the 2016 election and appointed Associate Minister for Public Enterprises.

In November 2020 Lisati's brother Aiolupotea Toni Leleisiuao was nominated as a candidate for the April 2021 election. Lisati challenged the nomination in court, and was banished from his village of Vailoa as a result. He lost his seat in the 2021 election.
