= Papaliʻi Liʻo Taeu Masipau =

Samoan politician

Speaker of the Legislative Assembly of Samoa
- In office 24 May 2021 – 16 September 2025 (Note: Disputed: 24 May 2021 – 23 July 2021)
- Prime Minister: Fiamē Naomi Mataʻafa
- Deputy: Auapaʻau Mulipola Aloitafua
- Preceded by: Leaupepe Toleafoa Faafisi
- Succeeded by: Auapaʻau Mulipola Aloitafua

Member of the Samoan Parliament
- In office 9 April 2021 – 3 June 2025
- Preceded by: Namulauʻulu Sami Leota
- Succeeded by: Namulauʻulu Sami Leota
- Constituency: Faʻasaleleʻaga No. 3
- In office 4 March 2011 – 4 March 2016
- Preceded by: Papalii Samuelu Petaia
- Succeeded by: Paʻu Sefo Paʻu
- Constituency: Faʻasaleleʻaga No. 2

Personal details
- Born: c. 1954 (age 71–72) Territory of Western Samoa
- Party: Tautua Samoa Party; Human Rights Protection Party; F.A.S.T.

Papaliʻi Liʻo Oloipola Taeu Masipau (born c. 1954) is a Samoan lawyer and former politician who served as Speaker of the Legislative Assembly of Samoa from 2021 to 2025.

Papaliʻi is a lawyer and former Assistant Police Commissioner. He was first elected to the Fono as a candidate for the Tautua Samoa Party in the 2011 Samoan general election. He lost his seat in the 2016 election. In 2019 he ran as a candidate for the Human Rights Protection Party in the Faʻasaleleaga No. 2 by-election, but was unsuccessful.

He was re-elected as a candidate for the F.A.S.T. party for Faʻasaleleaga No. 3 in the 2021 election. On 22 May 2021 he was nominated by FAST as Speaker. On 24 May he was sworn in in an ad-hoc ceremony after being locked out of Parliament. The appointment was disputed by the caretaker government. On 23 July 2021 the Court of Appeal ruled that the swearing-in ceremony was constitutional and binding, and that FAST had been the government since 24 May. On 26 July he was welcomed to parliament and given the keys to the parliamentary complex.

On 13 September, in response to HRPP MPs refusing to be sworn in by him, Papaliʻi banned them from attending the first full sitting of parliament. HRPP MPs were forbidden entry on both 14 and 15 September, and on 15 September the police threatened to disperse them by force. On 16 September 2021 the Supreme Court declared that the speaker has an obligation to administer the oath of allegiance, and ordered him to swear in the HRPP MPs. The MPs were sworn in on 17 September.

Following the 2021 Samoan by-elections Papaliʻi refused to swear in two HRPP MPs appointed under the women's quota until the Supreme Court finalised legal challenges on their appointment. The HRPP announced they would challenge the decision in court.

In December 2021 Papaliʻi's son, Deputy Electoral Commissioner Afualo Daryl Mapu, was arrested for dealing methamphetamine and possession of illegal weapons. Papaliʻi congratulated the police for their work and said that anyone who breaks the law should be held accountable for their actions.

During the 2025 snap election, Masipau lost his seat to the HRPP's Namulauʻulu Sami Leota, whom he had defeated in 2021. Reflecting on the election, Masipau said he was "relieved" and announced his intention to open a law firm. Auapaʻau Mulipola Aloitafua, who served as deputy speaker in the 17th Parliament, succeeded Masipau as speaker.

== Notes ==
Legislative Assembly of Samoa
Preceded by Papalii Samuelu Petaia	Member of Parliament for Faʻasaleleʻaga No. 2; 2011–2016	Succeeded by Paʻu Sefo Paʻu
Preceded by Namulauʻulu Sami Leota	Member of Parliament for Faʻasaleleʻaga No. 3; 2021–2025	Succeeded by Namulauʻulu Sami Leota
Preceded by Leaupepe Toleafoa Faafisi	Speaker of the Legislative Assembly of Samoa; 2021–2025	Succeeded by Auapaʻau Mulipola Aloitafua
