= Nafoitoa Talaimanu Keti =

Samoan politician

Nafoitoa Tala'imanu Keti
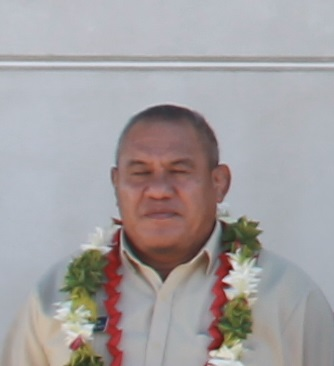
- Keti in 2018

Deputy Speaker of the Legislative Assembly of Samoa
- In office 17 March 2016 – 9 April 2021
- Preceded by: Agafili Patisela Eteuati Tolovaa
- Succeeded by: Auapaau Mulipola Aloitafua

Member of the Samoan Parliament for Gagaemauga No. 3
- In office 4 March 2016 – 9 April 2021
- Preceded by: Faamoetauloa Ulaitino Faale Tumaalii
- Succeeded by: None (Seat dissolved)

Personal details
- Party: Human Rights Protection Party

Nafoitoa Mataia Valu Tala'imanu Keti is a Samoan politician and former Deputy Speaker of the Legislative Assembly of Samoa. He is a former member of the Human Rights Protection Party.

Keti is a former police officer and assistant police commissioner. He was first elected to the legislative Assembly in the 2016 Samoan general election, and was appointed Deputy Speaker.

In May 2019 he removed opposition MP Olo Fiti Vaai from the Finance and Expenditure Committee after he criticised government spending decisions.

In March 2021 Keti was accused on EFKS-TV of attempting to rape a fellow police officer in 2007 when he was a supervisor at the Faleolo Police Outpost. The TV station was subsequently raided, and his accuser arrested and charged with criminal libel.

Keti's seat of Gagaemauga No. 3 was eliminated by boundary reforms in 2018. He stood in Gagaemauga No 2 at the April 2021 Samoan general election, but was unsuccessful.

Legislative Assembly of Samoa
Preceded by Faamoetauloa Ulaitino Faale Tumaalii	Member of Parliament for Gagaemauga No. 3; 2016–2021	Constituency abolished
Preceded by Agafili Patisela Eteuati Tolovaa	Deputy Speaker of the Legislative Assembly of Samoa; 2016–2021	Succeeded by Auapaau Mulipola Aloitafua
