= Faalogo Iosefa Sopi =

Samoan politician

Member of the Samoa Parliament for Siumu
- In office 4 March 2016 – 9 April 2021
- Preceded by: Tuu'u Anasi'i Leota
- Succeeded by: Tuu'u Anasi'i Leota

Personal details
- Party: Human Rights Protection Party

Faalogo Iosefa Sopi is a Samoan politician and former member of the Legislative Assembly of Samoa. He is a member of the Human Rights Protection Party.

He was first elected to the Legislative Assembly at the 2016 Samoan general election. In 2021 he complained in parliament that police and prison services members had low standards of physical fitness and were "getting fat". He lost his seat in the 2021 election.
