= List of members of the Legislative Assembly of Samoa (2025–2030) =

Legislative Members of Samoa

Members of the Legislative Assembly of Samoa were elected on 29 August 2025.

== Members ==
Name	Electorate	Party
Fiamē Naomi Mataʻafa	Lotofaga	Samoa Uniting Party
Tuilaʻepa Saʻilele Malielegaoi	Lepa	Human Rights Protection Party
Aeau Tima Leavaiseeta	Falealupo	Human Rights Protection Party
Faumuina Opapo Soanai Oeti	Faleata No. 1	Human Rights Protection Party
Leatinuu Wayne So'oialo	Faleata No. 2	Samoa Uniting Party
Lealailepule Rimoni Aiafi	Faleata No. 3	Human Rights Protection Party
Fesolai Apulu Tuigamala	Aana Alofi No. 1	Faʻatuatua i le Atua Samoa ua Tasi
Aiono Alec Ekeroma	Aana Alofi No. 2	Faʻatuatua i le Atua Samoa ua Tasi
Agaseata Valelio Tanuvasa	Aana Alofi No. 3	Faʻatuatua i le Atua Samoa ua Tasi
Afamasaga Mati Leone Masame	Aana Alofi No. 4	Faʻatuatua i le Atua Samoa ua Tasi
Auapaau Mulipola Aloitafua	Aiga i le Tai	Faʻatuatua i le Atua Samoa ua Tasi
Masinalupe Makesi Masinalupe	Lefaga and Faleaseela	Faʻatuatua i le Atua Samoa ua Tasi
Toelupe Poumulinuku Onesemo	Falealili No. 1	Faʻatuatua i le Atua Samoa ua Tasi
Fuimaono Maiava Tito Asafo	Falealili No. 2	Faʻatuatua i le Atua Samoa ua Tasi
Leatigaga Matafai Lauina Iiga	Faasaleleaga No. 1	Fa'atuatua i le Atua Samoa ua Tasi
Vaaelua Sentenari Samau	Faasaleleaga No. 2	Human Rights Protection Party
Namulauʻulu Sami Leota	Faasaleleaga No. 3	Human Rights Protection Party
Tea Tooala Peato	Faasaleleaga No. 4	Fa'atuatua i le Atua Samoa ua Tasi
Vui Iiga Sione Iiga	Faasaleleaga No. 5	Fa'atuatua i le Atua Samoa ua Tasi
Seuamuli Fasi Toma	Gagaemauga No. 2	Fa'atuatua i le Atua Samoa ua Tasi
Lavea Solomona Paulo	Gagaifomauga No. 1	Faʻatuatua i le Atua Samoa ua Tasi
Foʻisala Lilo Tuʻu Ioane	Gagaifomauga No. 2	Fa'atuatua i le Atua Samoa ua Tasi
Laʻauli Leuatea Schmidt	Gagaifomauga No. 3	Fa'atuatua i le Atua Samoa ua Tasi
Amituana'i Malolo Tautofi Roma	Vaisigano No. 1	Fa'atuatua i le Atua Samoa ua Tasi
Motuopuaa Seve Henry Papalii	Vaisigano No. 2	Independent
Taituave Lafaitele Valoaga Taatiti Iona	Alataua Sisifo (West)	Fa'atuatua i le Atua Samoa ua Tasi
	Salega No. 1	
Leilua Sagato Karene	Salega No. 2	Faʻatuatua i le Atua Samoa ua Tasi
Mulipola Anarosa Ale Molioʻo	Palauli No. 1	Faʻatuatua i le Atua Samoa ua Tasi
Fiu Ponifasio Vasa	Palauli No. 2	Independent
Aiolupotea Misa Tony Aiolupo	Palauli No. 3	Faʻatuatua i le Atua Samoa ua Tasi
Va'aaoao Salu Alofipo	Gagaemauga No. 1	Faʻatuatua i le Atua Samoa ua Tasi
Pauga Talalelei Pauga	Vaimauga No. 1	Faʻatuatua i le Atua Samoa ua Tasi
Lenatai Victor Tamapua	Vaimauga No. 2	Human Rights Protection Party
Taioaliiseu Fiti Aimaasu	Vaimauga No. 3	Human Rights Protection Party
Lima Graeme Tualaulelei	Vaimauga No. 4	Human Rights Protection Party
Ale Vena Ale	Faleata No. 4	Faʻatuatua i le Atua Samoa ua Tasi
Loau Keneti Sio	Sagaga No. 1	Human Rights Protection Party
Fata Ryan Schuster	Sagaga No. 2	Faʻatuatua i le Atua Samoa ua Tasi
Sala Paulo Tuala Poto	Sagaga No. 3	Faʻatuatua i le Atua Samoa ua Tasi
Lefue Pelenise Lelevaga	Sagaga No. 4	Human Rights Protection Party
Lupematasila Tologata Tile Leia	Falelatai and Samatau	Human Rights Protection Party
Seve Tei Fuimaono	Safata No. 1	Faʻatuatua i le Atua Samoa ua Tasi
Tuia Fuatogi Pu'a Letoa	Safata No. 2	Human Rights Protection Party
Faalogo A Kapeliele II Faalogo	Siumu	Independent
	Aleipata Itupa i Luga	
	Aleipata Itupa i Lalo	
	Vaa o Fonoti	
Moefaauouo Julius Tafunai	Anoamaa No. 1	Faʻatuatua i le Atua Samoa ua Tasi
	Anoamaa No. 2	
Asiata Salevao Leaoa	Satupaitea	Faʻatuatua i le Atua Samoa ua Tasi
