= 2025 Samoan general election =

- 29 August 2025

All 51 directly elected seats in the Legislative Assembly (and up to 6 additional female MPs)
- Registered: 101,981 (▼20.85%)
- Turnout: 88.65% (▲19.81pp)
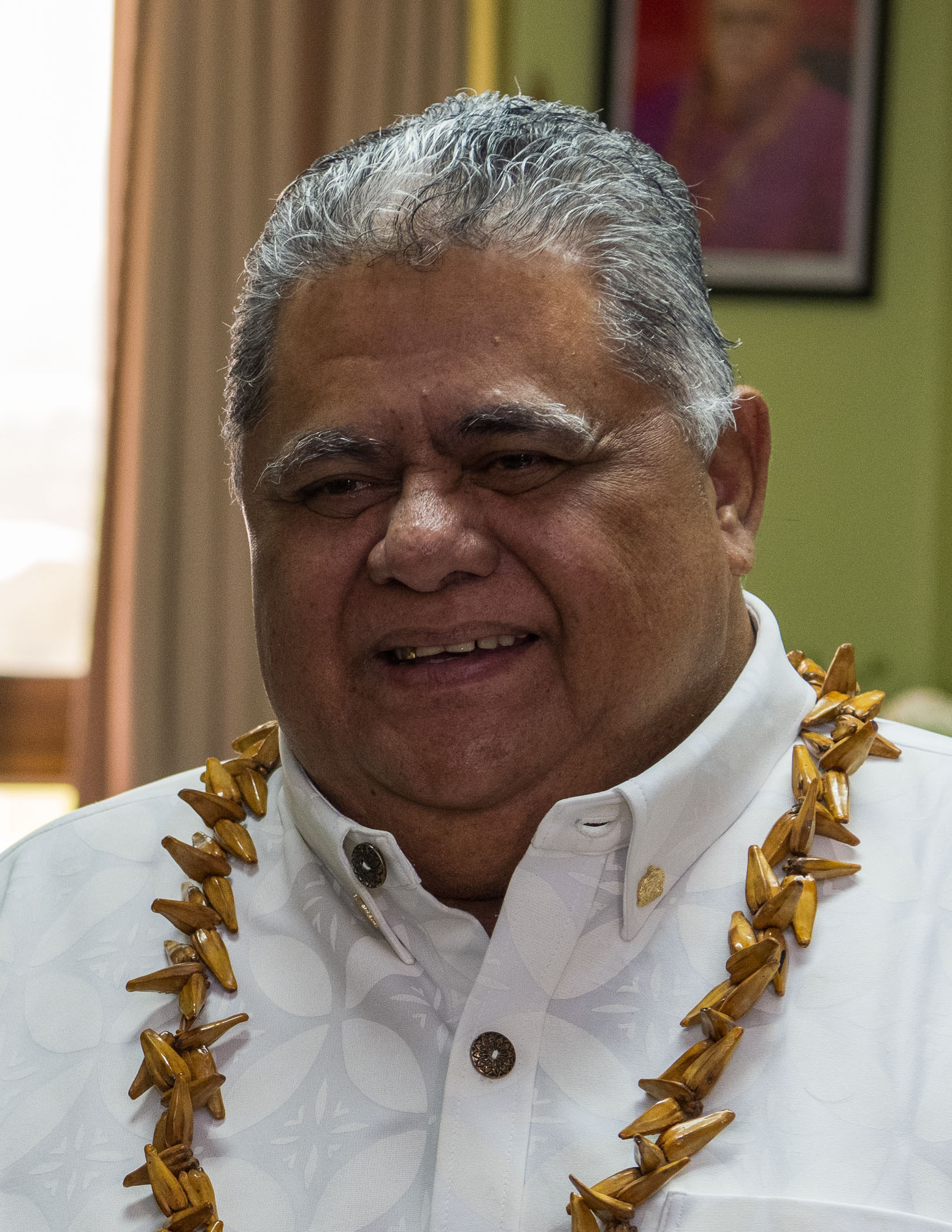

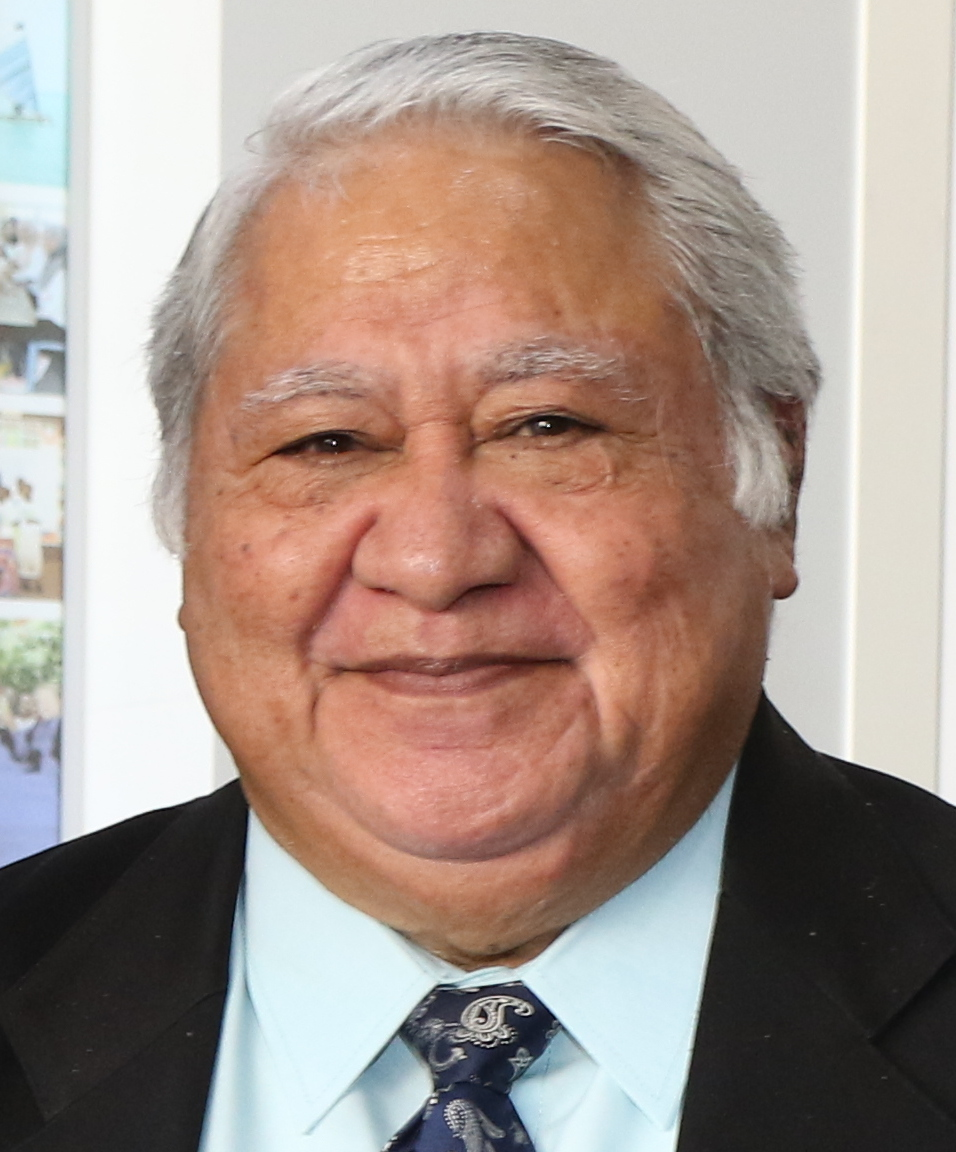

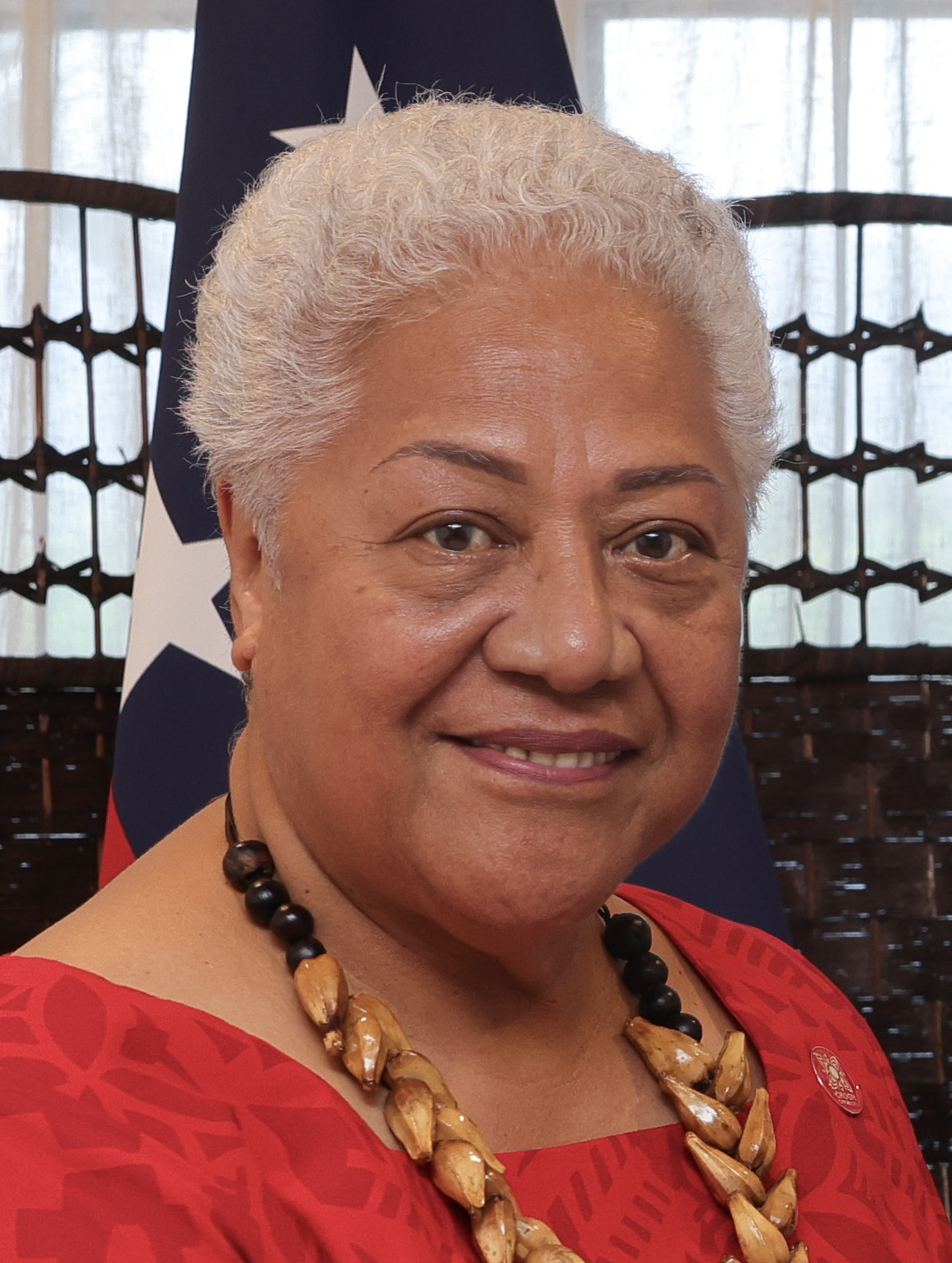
	First party	Second party	Third party
Leader	Laʻauli Leuatea Schmidt	Tuilaʻepa Saʻilele Malielegaoi	Fiamē Naomi Mataʻafa
Party	FAST	HRPP	SUP
Last election	36.57%, 25 seats	55.38%, 25 seats	New
Seats won	30	14	3
Seat change	▲5	▼11	New
Popular vote	36,708	33,040	7,746
Percentage	40.86%	36.78%	8.62%
Swing	▲4.29pp	▼18.60pp	New
- Results by constituency
Prime Minister before election
Fiamē Naomi Mataʻafa
SUP
Subsequent Prime Minister
Laʻauli Leuatea Schmidt
FAST

General elections were held in Samoa on 29 August 2025 to determine the composition of the 18th Parliament. Initially expected to be held in 2026, Prime Minister Fiamē Naomi Mataʻafa called a snap election after parliament voted down the government budget on 27 May 2025.

The Faʻatuatua i le Atua Samoa ua Tasi (FAST) party came to power after the 2021 election and subsequent constitutional crisis, which ended the 22-year premiership of Tuilaʻepa Saʻilele Malielegaoi and the nearly four-decade governance of his Human Rights Protection Party (HRPP). In January 2025, Mata‘afa and four other cabinet ministers were expelled from FAST after she dismissed party chairman Laʻauli Leuatea Schmidt from cabinet following his refusal to resign after being charged with criminal offences. Mata‘afa and the expelled ministers initially rejected their expulsions and claimed they were still party members. FAST subsequently split, with Schmidt leading a faction of 20 MPs while Mata‘afa led a minority government. Mata‘afa survived two no-confidence motions, one on 25 February and another on 6 March. Shortly after the election was called, Mata‘afa and her cabinet confirmed their departure from FAST and established the Samoa Uniting Party (SUP).

Most of the six parties that contested the election campaigned on issues concerning welfare, health and the economy. FAST won a majority of seats, securing 30. The HRPP won 14 seats. Three SUP and four independent candidates were also successful. Schmidt succeeded Mata‘afa as prime minister on 16 September.

== Background ==
=== 2021 general election ===
The previous election, held in 2021, resulted in a tie between the HRPP and FAST, with both parties winning 25 seats. One independent, Tuala Iosefo Ponifasio, won a seat and became kingmaker. The HRPP had governed Samoa for almost four decades, and its leader, Tuila‘epa Sa‘ilele Malielegaoi, had been prime minister since 1998. A major campaign issue was the passage of the controversial Land and Titles Bill by the HRPP government in 2020. Then-HRPP MP Laʻauli Leuatea Schmidt was expelled from the party due to his opposition to the bill and founded the FAST party. Several other HRPP MPs also defected in protest of the bill, including Deputy Prime Minister Fiamē Naomi Mataʻafa, who was elected to lead FAST shortly before the election. Weeks before the poll, the HRPP passed a law requiring MPs to contest a by-election if they change their affiliation in parliament, allegedly to prevent more MPs from defecting.

=== 2021 constitutional crisis ===
After the election, the HRPP and FAST negotiated with Ponifasio, seeking to win his support to form a government. Ponifasio later joined FAST; however, during the talks, a dispute arose over the fulfilment of the female quota. The Office of the Electoral Commission (OEC) declared the quota had not been met and appointed a sixth female member to parliament, Aliʻimalemanu Alofa Tuuau of the HRPP, resulting in a hung parliament. Prime Minister Malielegaoi subsequently called a snap election, while FAST challenged both decisions in court. The Supreme Court overturned the fresh election call, Tuuau's appointment, and ordered parliament to convene within 45 days of the election in accordance with the constitution. The O le Ao o le Malo, Tuimalealiʻifano Vaʻaletoʻa Sualauvi II, scheduled for parliament to convene on 24 May, the final day it could meet, but later retracted the proclamation. In response, the Supreme Court nullified the retraction. Malielegaoi refused to accept the results or cede power, plunging the country into a constitutional crisis. FAST conducted an ad hoc swearing-in ceremony on 24 May outside parliament, which the HRPP refused to attend or recognise as legitimate. On 23 July, the Court of Appeals ruled FAST to have been the legitimate government since 24 May, ending the crisis. The ruling confirmed Mataʻafa as Samoa's first female prime minister and ended Malielegaoi's almost 23-year tenure as head of government.

During the constitutional crisis, several HRPP members resigned or were stripped of their seats by the Supreme Court due to electoral petitions alleging electoral malpractice such as bribery. In the November 2021 by-elections to fill the vacancies, FAST won five seats while the HRPP only held two. FAST won all by-elections thereafter, and by September 2023, the party had attained a two-thirds majority in parliament, with 35 seats.

=== 2025 political crisis ===
On 3 January 2025, Agriculture and Fisheries Minister Laʻauli Leuatea Schmidt was charged with ten criminal offences, including harassment and conspiracy to pervert the course of justice over a political smear campaign that attempted to pin an unresolved hit-and-run case on a senior politician. Prime Minister Mataʻafa dismissed him from cabinet on 10 January after he refused to resign, and sacked another three cabinet ministers, citing disloyalty. On 15 January, the party removed Mataʻafa as FAST leader and expelled her, along with Deputy Prime Minister Tuala Iosefo Ponifasio and three other cabinet ministers from the party. Mataʻafa and the ousted ministers denounced the expulsion as illegal and maintained they were still FAST members. The party unanimously elected Schmidt as leader on 16 January, while Leota Laki Lamositele became deputy leader. The FAST party split into two factions, with 15 MPs remaining loyal to Mataʻafa and the other 20 joining Schmidt. Mataʻafa continued as prime minister in a minority government. Schmidt and his faction called on Mata‘afa to resign as prime minister but stated their opposition to a snap election.

==== No-confidence motions ====
On 25 February, Mataʻafa survived a no-confidence motion filed by the HRPP, which Schmidt's faction voted against. The FAST leader opposed the motion, citing a need for parliament to focus on key legislation, including amendments to the Land and Titles Act. Schmidt, however, announced he would introduce a second motion if Mataʻafa did not resign before the end of the parliamentary sessions. A week later, on 6 March, Mataʻafa defeated a second motion, which the HRPP voted against. The prime minister and her cabinet accused Speaker Papaliʻi Liʻo Taeu Masipau of lacking impartiality for approving another confidence vote only after a week. The HRPP initially negotiated with Schmidt's faction on moving a second motion but withdrew their support after the bloc refused to support a snap election.

=== Budget defeat and snap election call ===
Schmidt's trial began on 26 May. The following day, the government's budget was voted down by 34 to 16, with the HRPP and Schmidt's faction voting against it. Mataʻafa stated that by convention, a government's budget defeat reflects an issue of confidence in parliament and, on 28 May, advised the O le Ao o le Malo to dissolve the Legislative Assembly and call a snap election, bringing forward the polls originally expected for 2026. Mataʻafa and her cabinet subsequently confirmed their resignations from FAST and founded the Samoa Uniting Party (SUP).

Following the announcement, Attorney-General Suʻa Hellene Wallwork said that the government would seek a court ruling on how to resolve inconsistencies between the Electoral Act, which requires candidates to be nominated and electoral rolls to close six months before an election, and the constitutionally required election timeline of three months. At the time of parliament's dissolution, the OEC was conducting a re-registration drive of the electoral rolls. As only around 50% of eligible voters had registered, Electoral Commissioner Toleafoa Tuiafelolo Stanley requested additional time to allow more citizens to register. On 6 June, the Supreme Court upheld the constitutional three-month timeline and set the election for 29 August, denying the OEC's request. The court also stated that the next government would need to address the inconsistencies between the Constitution and the Electoral Act.

FAST challenged the dissolution in court, claiming it was unlawful and that the party had a parliamentary majority to govern. Shortly after the announcement, the Legislative Assembly clerk, Satama Leatisa Tala, wrote to the O le Ao o le Malo, attempting to nominate a new government. Tala mentioned the number of MPs in each party, stating that FAST held a majority despite parliament having dissolved. Mata‘afa said Tala's report had no legal validity as it was based on the composition from the beginning of the parliamentary term. The O le Ao o le Malo ultimately determined that Mata‘afa's government would retain control of the executive in a caretaker capacity until after the election, in keeping with convention.

== Electoral system ==
The 2025 election will see 51 members of parliament elected from single-member constituencies via the first-past-the-post voting system. The 2013 Constitutional Amendment Act mandates that at least 10% of members of parliament are women. If this quota were unfulfilled following an election, parliament must establish up to six additional seats allocated to the unsuccessful female candidates who attained the highest percentage of votes. To be eligible, candidates are required to hold a matai title, have reached the age of 21 and have resided in Samoa for at least three years before the nomination deadline. Individuals convicted of a crime in Samoa or any other country within the previous eight years and people with a mental illness were ineligible to stand as candidates. Civil servants were permitted to run as long as they resigned. Should civil servants fail to do so, the date of filing their candidacy is by law deemed to be the point when they relinquish their role.

=== Voters ===
Universal suffrage came into effect in 1991, permitting all Samoan citizens aged 21 and older the right to vote. Compulsory voting took effect at the 2021 general election. Individuals who fail to cast a vote are required to pay a fine of 100 tālā. Eligible voters who do not register are liable to pay a 2000 tālā fine. In April 2024, Lefau Harry Schuster, the minister responsible for the OEC, announced the commission would conduct a nationwide re-registration process, citing a need to upgrade the previous electronic enrollment system, which he said had become plagued with technical difficulties and could not accommodate new registrations. Schuster stated that Samoan citizens residing abroad who fail to register could be prosecuted upon returning to Samoa. He assured voters already enrolled were only required to undergo the biometric process. Samoan citizens overseas could register online but needed to travel to Samoa to complete the biometric stage. A bill permitting citizens to cast votes outside the country was not voted on in Parliament before the dissolution, thus maintaining the requirement for voters overseas to return to Samoa to vote. The electoral commissioner announced Samoans born overseas to parents who are Samoan citizens and resident abroad would be ineligible to participate in the election. At the closure of voter registrations, a provisional figure showed that 102,109 of the 117,225 eligible voters or 87%, were enrolled to vote. The registration total decreased to 101,981 after the OEC scrutinised the roll, which included the removal of deceased voters.

== Schedule ==
The O le Ao o le Malo formally dissolved the 17th Parliament on 3 June and issued the election writ a week later on 10 June. The OEC released the final election timetable on 13 June. Voter enrollment closed on 4 July, while the candidate registration period commenced on 7 July and concluded on 12 July. The campaign period began on 14 July and ended on 24 August. The OEC announced that campaigning outside of this period would be illegal. Candidates had until 14 August to withdraw their candidacies if they intended to do so, while early voting was scheduled for 27 August. Per the Public Holiday Act, the Ministry of Commerce, Industry and Labour designated election day and the day before as public holidays, with the aim of maximising voter participation.

Date	Event
3 June	The 17th Parliament is dissolved
10 June	The O le Ao o le Malo issues the Writ for the Election
4 July	Voter registration closes
7 July	Candidate nominations open
12 July	Candidate nominations close
14 July	Campaign period begins
14 August	Candidate withdrawal deadline
24 August	Campaign period ends
27 August	Early voting conducted
29 August	Election day
5 September	Official results are released
8 September	Writ returned and MPs announced

== Parties and candidates ==
Six parties contested the elections, including the Human Rights Protection Party, led by former Prime Minister Tuila‘epa Sa‘ilele Malielegaoi, and the Fa‘atuatua i le Atua Samoa ua Tasi party, led by La‘auli Leautea Schmidt. In addition to Prime Minister Fiamē Naomi Mata‘afa's Samoa Uniting Party, three other newly founded parties were registered to contest the election: the Constitution Democracy Republic Party (CDRP), led by Maiava Seimalu Oswald, the Samoa Labour Party (SLP) and the Tumua ma Pule Reform Republican Party (TPRRP). Led by former Justice Minister Faʻaolesa Katopau Ainuʻu, the SLP was established by former HRPP members, who were dissatisfied with the party's candidate selection process. The TPRRP was led into the election by Molio‘o Pio Molioʻo, the husband of FAST member and former finance minister, Mulipola Anarosa Ale Molioʻo.

Initially, a record 191 candidates were registered to contest the election, including 24 female contestants, a slight increase from the 21 in the 2021 election. Following court challenges and withdrawals, the total number of contestants decreased to 188. Two Faʻafafine also ran in the election. FAST had 57 candidates, the HRPP 51, while the SUP fielded 26. Labour had six candidates, the CDRP and the TPRRP fielded one each, and there were 46 independent contestants. Two candidates in the Faleata 2 constituency were disqualified. As a result, the incumbent member, Public Enterprises Minister Leatinuʻu Wayne Soʻoialo of the SUP, became the only candidate to win his seat unopposed in this election.

Party	Leader	Candidates	2021 seats
Faʻatuatua i le Atua Samoa ua Tasi	Laʻauli Leuatea Schmidt	57	25 / 51
Human Rights Protection Party	Tuilaʻepa Saʻilele Malielegaoi	51	25 / 51
Samoa Uniting Party	Fiamē Naomi Mataʻafa	26	Not yet founded
Samoa Labour Party	Faʻaolesa Katopau Ainuʻu	6	Not yet founded
Constitution Democracy Republic Party	Maiava Seimalu Oswald	1	Not yet founded
Tumua ma Pule Reform Republican Party	Molioʻo Pio Molioʻo	1	Not yet founded
Independents	—N/a	46	1 / 51

== Campaign ==
Most parties contesting the election included platforms promising job creation, free public healthcare and infrastructure investment. The official campaign period began on 14 July; however, reports surfaced of several candidates publishing campaign posters on social media beforehand. The OEC announced that campaigning outside of the official period, including the distribution of posters, was unlawful. Several chiefs in Falelatai, the village of the O le Ao o le Malo, located in the Falelatai and Samatau constituency, announced a ban on parties from campaigning in the village. The village chiefs had also attempted to block any candidates from contesting the district, aside from HRPP members. The HRPP had won the constituency in the two previous elections. The electoral commissioner stated that the move was illegal. Malielegaoi denied that the HRPP or the O le Ao o le Malo had any involvement with the chiefs' decision.

During a FAST rally on Savaiʻi, Schmidt claimed Mata‘afa had suppressed evidence in the case of the murder of Caroline Sinavaiana-Gabbard. In response, Mata‘afa filed a defamation complaint and stated that Schmidt should avoid personal attacks and "stick to the issues". Police Commissioner Auapaʻau Logoitino Filipo said the FAST leader's allegation was similar to a claim made against the prime minister in March 2025, which a police investigation found was false. Malielegaoi denounced Schmidt's claim and called for him to be arrested.

=== Faʻatuatua i le Atua Samoa ua Tasi ===
The FAST party announced its campaign would significantly focus on economic revitalisation and social welfare. The party launched its manifesto on 12 July in Savaiʻi, announcing free hospital care, a new hospital in Salelologa, an increase in village development funding, increased support for families, and a baby bonus. It also planned to raise the retirement age from 55 to 65, launch a $1.5 billion tālā carbon credit scheme and establish a national stock exchange. FAST, furthermore, intended to revitalise Samoa Airways by investing $300 million tālā into the airline and raise the annual district grant from one to two million tālā for each district, which would total $110 million tālā of the yearly government budget.

=== Human Rights Protection Party ===
The HRPP campaigned on providing economic support and proposed large-scale infrastructure projects. The party had the most policy proposals in its manifesto, including a poverty alleviation strategy that would see families receive annual cash grants of $500 tālā for every family member. Malielegaoi claimed Samoa's economic situation had faltered during FAST's tenure in government and that the country used to be "looked up to" by other Pacific Island nations, but that the party had left Samoa in an "embarrassing" state. The HRPP released its full manifesto on 20 June, having commenced campaigning earlier that month, with proposals to reduce taxes, hospital expansion and the construction of a bridge between Upolu and Savaiʻi.

=== Samoa Uniting Party ===
The SUP launched its manifesto on 15 July. Mata‘afa stated that the party had risen "from the ashes of FAST". The party pledged to fulfil FAST's uncompleted promises from the last election, including electoral reform, a disability allowance and pension increases. The SUP announced it would retain the district grant programme, with funds varying from one to two million tālā, depending on each district's requirements and size. The party also promised to reduce the value-added goods and services tax, remove the electricity tax, and provide a 20% tax refund to all citizens if it formed a government after the election. Free education from early childhood to the tertiary level and an increase in the retirement age to 60 were also included in the party's manifesto. The SUP vowed to return village lands seized by the German colonial administration that had not been repatriated to customary landowners.

=== Others ===
The Labour Party's campaign focused on trade and employment. It promised to raise the minimum wage, establish an export processing zone, and introduce a family welfare programme. The party expressed interest in entering a coalition government. The TPRRP's pledges included investing in cultural institutions and decreasing residential electricity expenses.

A coalition named Independent Together, made up of 27 independent candidates, was formed shortly before the election. The alliance launched a manifesto on 13 August, and warned that the country was being fractured by political tensions. Independent Together chairman, Leiataualesa Jerry Brunt, stated that the bloc's key objective was to "support the voice of independents in the Parliament". Brunt expressed his intention for the coalition to remain unified but said members were free to support other parties in parliament. The group declined to support an opposition party if it were to become a kingmaker after the election, but pledged to review other parties' manifestos before signing any coalition agreements.

== Conduct ==
The OEC received reports alleging that some individuals had unlawfully completed online registrations on behalf of intending candidates. Some campaign committees also reportedly arranged and financed transport for voters to registration centres. The OEC warned that such a practice was illegal. On 26 June, Police Commissioner Filipo announced the creation of a special election crimes taskforce to deal with voter fraud, vote buying, and other electoral crimes.

During pre-polling on 27 August, several journalists covering the election were ordered by police to leave polling stations. Police Commissioner Filipo said the incidents were a "misunderstanding" and stemmed from confusion about a rule prohibiting journalists from taking photographs if they are less than 50 metres away from a polling station. Electoral Commissioner Stanley stated that one of the police officers who turned away the journalists reportedly fell asleep during a briefing on the rules on the media's election coverage. Lagi Keresoma, the president of the Journalist Association of Samoa (JAWS), said the incidents were "unacceptable" and announced that JAWS would raise the issue with the police. On election day, polling stations opened at 8 am and closed at 3 pm, although electors still waiting to vote after that time were allowed to cast a ballot. Further reports subsequently surfaced on polling day of police officers, who were allegedly unfamiliar with media regulations, unlawfully ordering journalists to remain at least 100 metres away from polling centres.

On 31 August, a day before the official count began, FAST candidate Toelupe Poumulinuku Onesemo went to the OEC's operation centre, where vote counting was taking place, and reportedly attempted to force the OEC to commence official counting ahead of schedule. The police ordered Onesemo to leave, and then conducted an investigation into the incident. The following day, three other FAST candidates, including Party Secretary Vaʻaaoao Salumalo Alofipo, also entered the OEC premises unlawfully, while votes were being tallied. Candidates are barred by law from entering venues where ballots are being counted. Electoral Commissioner Stanley said Alofipo had come to express concern about ballot box security. Stanley told the trio they were not allowed at the operation centre and called for them, along with Onesemo, to be charged with violating the Electoral Act. Police subsequently increased security around the OEC premises.

== Results ==
The official vote count was completed on 4 September. FAST secured a majority of seats, winning 30, while the HRPP won 14. The SUP won three seats, while independents secured four. Most of Mata‘afa's cabinet ministers, including Deputy Prime Minister Tuala Iosefo Ponifasio, lost their seats. Parliamentary Speaker Papaliʻi Liʻo Taeu Masipau of FAST also lost re-election. Five women won seats, one short of the six required to fulfil the female quota. The electoral commissioner announced that an additional female member would not be appointed to parliament until after the conclusion of post-election legal challenges.

Party	Votes	%	Seats	+/–
Faʻatuatua i le Atua Samoa ua Tasi	36,708	40.86	30	+5
Human Rights Protection Party	33,040	36.78	14	–11
Samoa Uniting Party	7,746	8.62	3	New
Samoa Labour Party	1,042	1.16	0	New
Tumua ma Pule Reform Republican Party	42	0.05	0	New
Constitution Democracy Republic Party	25	0.03	0	New
Independents	11,232	12.50	4	+3
Total	89,835	100.00	51	0
Valid votes	89,835	99.37		
Invalid/blank votes	568	0.63		
Total votes	90,403	100.00		
Registered voters/turnout	101,981	88.65		
Source: OEC, OEC, OEC, Samoa Observer (seats)

=== By constituency ===
Constituency	Turnout	Political party	Candidate	Votes	%
Aʻana Alofi 1	1,976	FAST	Fesolai Apulu Tuigamala	932	47.17
Aʻana Alofi 1	1,976	Independent	Taueva Faʻafouina Mupo	473	23.94
Aʻana Alofi 1	1,976	HRPP	Ufagalilo Faʻamanu Mualia	397	20.09
Aʻana Alofi 1	1,976	Independent	Fesolai Suafoa Apulu	131	6.63
Aʻana Alofi 1	1,976	Independent	Leaupepetele Filipo Leaupepe	43	2.18
Aʻana Alofi 2	1,207	FAST	Aiono Alec Ekeroma	547	45.32
Aʻana Alofi 2	1,207	HRPP	Aiono Tile Gafa	473	39.19
Aʻana Alofi 2	1,207	FAST	Ape Leulumoega Sofara	109	9.03
Aʻana Alofi 2	1,207	Independent	Aiono Meapelo Frost	78	6.46
Aʻana Alofi 3	1,675	FAST	Agaseata Valelio Tanuvasa	896	53.49
Aʻana Alofi 3	1,675	HRPP	Niuapu Faʻaui II Leiataualesa	473	28.24
Aʻana Alofi 3	1,675	Independent	Masinamua Maselusi Pisia Ah Poe	153	9.13
Aʻana Alofi 3	1,675	SUP	Ili Tanuvasa Pelesasa Tanuvasa	82	4.90
Aʻana Alofi 3	1,675	Independent	Sinaifoa Vaimoana Soʻoaemalelagi	71	4.24
Aʻana Alofi 4	2,403	FAST	Afamasaga Leone Mati	848	35.29
Aʻana Alofi 4	2,403	HRPP	Sevealiʻi Taulalo Sevealiʻi	602	25.05
Aʻana Alofi 4	2,403	SUP	Toeolesulusulu Cedric Schuster	454	18.89
Aʻana Alofi 4	2,403	Independent	Tagoiaega Maotua Puipui	434	18.06
Aʻana Alofi 4	2,403	Independent	Lasei Sione Lasei	65	2.70
Aiga-i-le-Tai	2,827	FAST	Auapaʻau Mulipola Aloitafua	1,169	41.35
Aiga-i-le-Tai	2,827	HRPP	Mulipola Leiataualetua Laki	1,103	39.03
Aiga-i-le-Tai	2,827	Independent	Leiataualesa Jerry Brunt	280	9.90
Aiga-i-le-Tai	2,827	Independent	Seʻulu Iloa Togia	153	5.41
Aiga-i-le-Tai	2,827	Independent	Levaʻa Samoa James Utuva	122	4.32
Alataua Sisifo	999	FAST	Taituave Lafaitele Valoaga Iona	522	52.25
Alataua Sisifo	999	HRPP	Aliʻimalemanu Alofa Tuuau	477	47.75
Aleipata Itupa-I-Lalo	2,021	SUP	Faleomavaega Titimaea Tafua	663	32.81
Aleipata Itupa-I-Lalo	2,021	HRPP	Taiao Tautunu Aumualesigano	537	26.57
Aleipata Itupa-I-Lalo	2,021	FAST	Vaotogo Rodney Chang Tamasese	509	25.19
Aleipata Itupa-I-Lalo	2,021	HRPP	Faʻagasealiʻi Sapoa Feagiai	312	15.44
Aleiptata Itupa-I-Luga	774	FAST	Taufua Edmund Taufua	346	44.70
Aleiptata Itupa-I-Luga	774	Independent	Alailesulu Faʻapalo Toʻomalatai	218	28.17
Aleiptata Itupa-I-Luga	774	HRPP	Fuaʻava Amataga Penaia	210	27.13
Anoamaʻa 1	2,490	FAST	Moefaʻauouo Julius Tafunai	1,235	49.60
Anoamaʻa 1	2,490	HRPP	Alaiasa Sepulona Moananu	1,213	48.71
Anoamaʻa 1	2,490	TPRRP	Molioʻo Pio Molioʻo	42	1.69
Anoamaʻa 2	2,417	HRPP	Fonotoe Pierre Lauofo	1,214	50.23
Anoamaʻa 2	2,417	FAST	Leiu Ioane Sio	899	37.19
Anoamaʻa 2	2,417	FAST	Toʻomata Norah Leota	195	8.07
Anoamaʻa 2	2,417	SUP	Taiatu Asi Sasa Milo	109	4.51
Faʻasaleleʻaga 1	1,968	FAST	Leatigaga Matāfai Iiga	866	44.00
Faʻasaleleʻaga 1	1,968	HRPP	Pipi Tariu Sinapati	725	36.84
Faʻasaleleʻaga 1	1,968	FAST	Seumanu Faimata Suʻa	233	11.83
Faʻasaleleʻaga 1	1,968	SUP	Matamua Vasati Pulufana	144	7.32
Faʻasaleleʻaga 2	1,869	HRPP	Vaʻaelua Sentenari Samau	678	36.28
Faʻasaleleʻaga 2	1,869	FAST	Magele Sekati Fiaui	610	32.64
Faʻasaleleʻaga 2	1,869	Independent	Talouli Iosefa Talouli	319	17.07
Faʻasaleleʻaga 2	1,869	HRPP	Magele Tusigaigoa Simaika	196	10.49
Faʻasaleleʻaga 2	1,869	Independent	Malu Saletolo Vaʻaelua	66	3.53
Faʻasaleleʻaga 3	1,812	HRPP	Namulauʻulu Sami Leota	1,023	56.46
Faʻasaleleʻaga 3	1,812	FAST	Papaliʻi Liʻo Taeu Masipau	789	43.54
Faʻasaleleʻaga 4	1,443	FAST	Tea Tooala Peato	796	55.16
Faʻasaleleʻaga 4	1,443	HRPP	Tofa Foleni Lio	335	23.22
Faʻasaleleʻaga 4	1,443	Independent	Talatau Lisale Tuioti	312	21.62
Faʻasaleleʻaga 5	932	FAST	Vui Iiga Sione Iiga	468	50.21
Faʻasaleleʻaga 5	932	HRPP	Peseta Vaifou Tevaga	388	41.63
Faʻasaleleʻaga 5	932	Independent	Vui Ana Nora Ah Him	76	8.15
Falealili 1	1,787	FAST	Toelupe Poumulinuku Onesemo	941	52.66
Falealili 1	1,787	HRPP	Tuiloma Laniselota Lameko	617	34.53
Falealili 1	1,787	SUP	Tumanuvao Pualele Fui	152	8.51
Falealili 1	1,787	Independent	Siʻa Alec Leaupepe Latu	77	4.31
Falealili 2	890	FAST	Maiava Fuimaono Asafo	299	33.60
Falealili 2	890	Independent	Fuimaono Maria Meredith	276	31.03
Falealili 2	890	Independent	Fuimaono Atanoa Alex Wright	194	21.80
Falealili 2	890	Independent	Tauaefa Autalavou Tauaefa	119	13.37
Falealili 2	890	SLP	Alaifea Laititi Belford	2	0.22
Falealupo	801	HRPP	Leota Tima Leavai	379	47.32
Falealupo	801	FAST	Seufata Eteuati Sulutolu	297	37.08
Falealupo	801	FAST	Tuimaseve Poto Fiu	125	15.61
Faleata 1	4,722	HRPP	Faumuina Opapo Oeti	1,466	31.05
Faleata 1	4,722	HRPP	Manuleleua Sonny Lameta	1,427	30.22
Faleata 1	4,722	FAST	Manuleleua Paletasala Tovale	1,423	30.14
Faleata 1	4,722	Independent	Tomaʻagauaune Mikaele Une	406	8.06
Faleata 3	2,568	HRPP	Lealaʻilepule Rimoni Aiafi	1,476	57.48
Faleata 3	2,568	FAST	Paloa Louis James Stowers	1,092	42.52
Faleata 4	2,047	FAST	Ale Vena Ale	1,226	59.89
Faleata 4	2,047	HRPP	Pepe Christian Fruean	672	32.83
Faleata 4	2,047	SUP	Mapu Tafaigata Toilolo	149	7.28
Falelatai and Samatau	1,687	HRPP	Lupematasila Tologata Tile Leia	874	51.81
Falelatai and Samatau	1,687	FAST	Teleiai Christian Ausage	667	39.54
Falelatai and Samatau	1,687	SUP	Faʻalavaʻau Fasitau Ula	146	8.65
Gagaʻemauga 1	1,223	FAST	Vaʻaaoao Salumalo Alofipo	483	39.49
Gagaʻemauga 1	1,223	SUP	Tuala Iosefo Ponifasio	312	25.51
Gagaʻemauga 1	1,223	Independent	Lauano Mulivai Lauano	236	19.30
Gagaʻemauga 1	1,223	HRPP	Tevaga Mikaele Ah Lam	192	15.70
Gagaʻemauga 2	1,120	FAST	Seuamuli Fasi Toma	606	54.11
Gagaʻemauga 2	1,120	Independent	Valu Talaimanu Keti	310	27.68
Gagaʻemauga 2	1,120	HRPP	Galuvao Valma Galuvao	240	18.21
Gagaʻifomauga 1	947	FAST	Lavea Solomona Paulo	383	40.44
Gagaʻifomauga 1	947	HRPP	Timu Iakopo Timu	287	30.31
Gagaʻifomauga 1	947	Independent	Lavea Iulai Lavea Loia	214	22.60
Gagaʻifomauga 1	947	HRPP	Tumele Toefuataina Lele-Schmidt	63	6.65
Gagaʻifomauga 2	1,460	FAST	Foʻisala Lilo Tuʻu Ioane	334	22.88
Gagaʻifomauga 2	1,460	Independent	Falesaopule Vaialia Iosua	310	21.23
Gagaʻifomauga 2	1,460	HRPP	Tologataua Sioeli Lamese	303	20.75
Gagaʻifomauga 2	1,460	SLP	Soʻoalo Umi Feo Mene	222	15.21
Gagaʻifomauga 2	1,460	SUP	Soʻoalo Kuresa Soʻoalo	171	11.71
Gagaʻifomauga 2	1,460	HRPP	Tagaloa Mark Huch	120	8.22
Gagaʻifomauga 3	967	FAST	Laʻauli Leuatea Schmidt	869	89.87
Gagaʻifomauga 3	967	HRPP	Faʻaulusau Rosa Duffy-Stowers	98	10.13
Lefaga and Faleaseʻela	2,089	FAST	Masinalupe Makesi Masinalupe	891	42.65
Lefaga and Faleaseʻela	2,089	HRPP	Suafaiga John Pasina	589	28.20
Lefaga and Faleaseʻela	2,089	SUP	Tusanilefaiaʻao Luasamotu Nuʻusa	262	12.54
Lefaga and Faleaseʻela	2,089	SLP	Suʻa Tanielu Suʻa	234	11.20
Lefaga and Faleaseʻela	2,089	HRPP	Masinalupe Tusipa Masinalupe	113	5.41
Lepā	791	HRPP	Tuilaʻepa Saʻilele Malielegaoi	685	86.60
Lepā	791	FAST	Tupua John Tupua	106	13.40
Lotofaga	959	SUP	Fiamē Naomi Mataʻafa	486	50.68
Lotofaga	959	FAST	Fuimapoao Beth Onesemo	247	25.76
Lotofaga	959	FAST	Fiaola Iosua Lole	226	23.57
Palauli 1	1,668	FAST	Mulipola Anarosa Ale Molioʻo	725	43.47
Palauli 1	1,668	Independent	Lealofi Lolopo Gafo	432	25.90
Palauli 1	1,668	HRPP	Fuli Pisa Mulipola	313	18.76
Palauli 1	1,668	Independent	Tupai Avala Savaiʻinaea	198	11.87
Palauli 2	1,740	Independent	Fiu Ponifasio Vasa	634	36.35
Palauli 2	1,740	Independent	Faʻaolatane Iona Pao	632	36.24
Palauli 2	1,740	FAST	Leota Laki Lamositele	252	14.55
Palauli 2	1,740	Independent	Tiatia Faleupolu Tevita	156	8.94
Palauli 2	1,740	HRPP	Faʻasuaiau Asiata Tanielu	55	3.15
Palauli 2	1,740	SUP	Tuisata Hay Kalapu	15	0.86
Palauli 3	1,391	FAST	Aiolupotea Misa Tony Aiolupo	811	58.90
Palauli 3	1,391	HRPP	Leituala Benhur Matalavea	505	36.30
Palauli 3	1,391	SUP	Lagaʻaia Tiatuau Tufuga	75	5.39
Safata 1	1,961	FAST	Seve Teʻi Fuimaono	949	48.39
Safata 1	1,961	HRPP	Leaʻana Ronnie Posini	807	41.15
Safata 1	1,961	SUP	Fepuleai Samuelu Taufao	205	10.45
Safata 2	1,593	HRPP	Tuia Fuatogi Puʻa Letoa	650	40.80
Safata 2	1,593	FAST	Tupai Saimasi John Matthes	628	39.42
Safata 2	1,593	SUP	Laumatiamanu Ringo Purcell	287	18.02
Safata 2	1,593	SLP	Toleafoa Losalia Niumata	28	1.76
Sagaga 1	2,702	HRPP	Loau Keneti Sio	1,629	60.29
Sagaga 1	2,702	FAST	Samaina Kirisome Taulapapa	1,073	39.71
Sagaga 2	2,967	FAST	Fata Ryan Schuster	1,297	43.71
Sagaga 2	2,967	HRPP	Maualaivao Seiuli Pepe Seiuli	899	30.30
Sagaga 2	2,967	SUP	Maulolo Tavita Amosa	727	24.50
Sagaga 2	2,967	Independent	Tupualiʻi Faʻalili Saena Seuai	44	1.48
Sagaga 3	2,509	FAST	Sala Paulo Tuala Poto	939	37.43
Sagaga 3	2,509	HRPP	Tuala Olivetti Ah Him	917	36.55
Sagaga 3	2,509	SLP	Tuala Teleʻa Liliʻi	535	21.32
Sagaga 3	2,509	Independent	Sala Vaimili II	118	4.70
Sagaga 4	2,502	HRPP	Lefue Pelenise Lelevaga	1,048	41.89
Sagaga 4	2,502	Independent	Patea Tuisa Tasi	540	21.58
Sagaga 4	2,502	FAST	Tagaloatele Pasi Poloa	476	19.02
Sagaga 4	2,502	SUP	Mataʻafa Saeni Leatupuʻe	434	17.35
Sagaga 4	2,502	Independent	Tumua Kelemete Vitale	4	0.16
Salega 1	1,037	FAST	Tilafono David Hunter	473	45.61
Salega 1	1,037	HRPP	Selu Letoa Reupena Selu	406	39.15
Salega 1	1,037	Independent	Falesiʻi Aisa Autagavaia	177	23.23
Salega 2	762	FAST	Leilua Sagato Karene	342	44.88
Salega 2	762	SUP	Olo Fiti Vaai	243	31.09
Salega 2	762	HRPP	Maeʻe Ualesi Silva	177	23.23
Satupaʻitea	1,120	FAST	Asiata Salevao Leaoa	476	42.50
Satupaʻitea	1,120	HRPP	Lautafi Fio Selafi Purcell	375	33.48
Satupaʻitea	1,120	FAST	Asiata Tuasivi Setu	269	24.02
Siʻumu	1,341	Independent	Faʻalogo Kapeliele II Faʻalogo	492	36.69
Siʻumu	1,341	FAST	Tuʻuʻu Anasiʻi Leota	456	34.00
Siʻumu	1,341	HRPP	Faiva Lokeuaina Luamanuvae	335	24.98
Siʻumu	1,341	SUP	Tuʻuʻu Ekiumeni Fauolo	39	2.91
Siʻumu	1,341	Independent	Tofaeono Salamasina Tofacono	19	1.42
Vaʻa-o-Fonoti	960	Independent	Mauʻu Siaosi Puʻepuʻemai	547	56.98
Vaʻa-o-Fonoti	960	FAST	Fuimaono Vaitolo Ofoia	267	27.81
Vaʻa-o-Fonoti	960	HRPP	Leausa Take Naseri	121	12.60
Vaʻa-o-Fonoti	960	CDRP	Taumainamoe Aufui Brown	25	2.60
Vaimauga 1	3,659	FAST	Pauga Talalelei Pauga	1,231	33.64
Vaimauga 1	3,659	HRPP	Sulamanaia Tauiliili Tuivasa	1,096	29.95
Vaimauga 1	3,659	SUP	Fataʻaliʻi Milovale Moke	786	21.48
Vaimauga 1	3,659	Independent	Safai Iosua Selesele	546	14.92
Vaimauga 2	2,314	HRPP	Lenatai Victor Tamapua	1,341	57.95
Vaimauga 2	2,314	FAST	Tamaleta Taimung Jensen	886	38.29
Vaimauga 2	2,314	Independent	Niuafolau Fauolegogo Tanielu	87	3.76
Vaimauga 3	4,005	HRPP	Taioaliʻiseu Fiti Aimaʻasu	1,465	36.58
Vaimauga 3	4,005	SUP	Lautimuia Uelese Vaʻai	1,339	33.43
Vaimauga 3	4,005	FAST	Nonu Laulu William Mauia	1,096	27.37
Vaimauga 3	4,005	Independent	Siligatusa Alosina Ropati	105	2.62
Vaimauga 4	2,602	HRPP	Lima Graeme Tualaulelei	1,137	43.70
Vaimauga 4	2,602	FAST	Tonuʻu Fuamoli Misi	949	36.47
Vaimauga 4	2,602	Independent	Vaea Ivana Eli	322	12.38
Vaimauga 4	2,602	SUP	Lefau Harry Schuster	173	6.65
Vaimauga 4	2,602	SLP	Faʻaolesa Katopau Ainuʻu	21	0.81
Vaisigano 1	1,148	FAST	Amituanaʻi Tautofi Roma	570	49.65
Vaisigano 1	1,148	Independent	Masoe Matemini Taulafo	420	36.59
Vaisigano 1	1,148	SUP	Niuava Eti Malolo	158	13.76
Vaisigano 2	979	Independent	Motuopuaʻa Henny Papaliʻi	409	41.78
Vaisigano 2	979	FAST	Tagaloa Tupou Afa	193	19.71
Vaisigano 2	979	FAST	Sua Faʻavae Timoteo	166	16.96
Vaisigano 2	979	SUP	Valasi Toogamaga Tafito	135	13.79
Vaisigano 2	979	HRPP	Alopopo Siafausa Matafeo	76	7.76
Source: OEC

==== Uncontested ====
One candidate was elected unopposed:

Constituency	Candidate	Party
Faleata 2	Leatinuʻu Wayne Soʻoialo	SUP

== Aftermath ==
During a post-election rally, where FAST was celebrating the results, party leader Schmidt called for unity and stated it was time for a government "led by God". He appealed to Malielegaoi and Mata‘afa to support a FAST government. The HRPP claimed the results were influenced by bribery and pledged to challenge them in court. Malielegaoi stated that his party was surprised by the early results and alleged that "voters are no longer looking ahead to the future, but are only looking at the money that is being given to them the night before elections".

Mata‘afa conceded the election and congratulated FAST. She urged the incoming government to prioritise passing a National budget. Mata‘afa attributed the SUP's defeat to only having been founded shortly before the election and mentioned that many of the party's candidates also had to fulfil their duties as cabinet ministers. After the election, Fiu Ponifasio Vasa, who ran as an independent, joined FAST, increasing the party's seat share to 31. The O le Ao o le Malo swore in the 18th Parliament on 16 September, after which Schmidt assumed office as prime minister. Auapaʻau Mulipola Aloitafua, who served as deputy speaker in the previous parliament, became speaker. Toelupe Poumulinuku Onesemo became deputy prime minister and, per an arrangement, is expected to hold the post until midway through the parliamentary term in 2028, when Finance Minister Mulipola Anarosa Ale Molioʻo succeeds him.

Eight unsuccessful candidates filed electoral petitions against their victorious opponents, alleging that they had engaged in corrupt practices. Four petitions were submitted by HRPP candidates, three by FAST, and one by an independent. One petition, which was filed by the HRPP's Mulipola Leiataualesa Laki against Speaker Aloitafua, was withdrawn before court hearings commenced. Three other complainants, including former Speaker Masipau, also withdrew their petitions. In late November, the electoral court ruled that FAST MP and cabinet minister Seve Teʻi Fuimaono, along with petitioner Leaʻana Ronnie Posini, were guilty of corruption charges. The ruling triggered a by-election in the Safata 1 constituency. Deputy Prime Minister Onesemo was convicted of bribery in March 2026. His election to the Falealili 1 seat was subsequently voided, resulting in a by-election in the constituency.

On 21 July 2026, the OEC issued a public notice, instructing all 6,716 registered electors who did not vote in the general election to report to its office in Mulinuʻu and explain their reasons for not participating. The OEC also requested they supply official documents and written explanations to prove they had a valid excuse.

== See also ==
- List of members of the Legislative Assembly of Samoa (2025–2030)
