= Toeolesulusulu Cedric Schuster =

Samoan politician

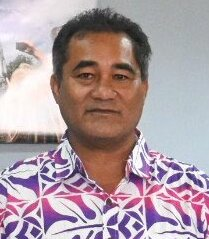

Minister of Natural Resources and Environment
- In office 20 October 2021 – 16 September 2025
- Prime Minister: Fiamē Naomi Mataʻafa
- Preceded by: Fiamē Naomi Mata‘afa
- Succeeded by: Seve Te‘i Fuimaono
- In office 24 May 2021 – 3 June 2021
- Prime Minister: Fiamē Naomi Mataʻafa
- Preceded by: Tuilaʻepa Saʻilele Malielegaoi
- Succeeded by: Fiamē Naomi Mata‘afa

Minister of Tourism
- In office 20 October 2021 – 1 October 2023
- Prime Minister: Fiamē Naomi Mataʻafa
- Preceded by: Fiamē Naomi Mataʻafa
- Succeeded by: Fiamē Naomi Mataʻafa

Member of the Samoan Parliament
- In office 24 May 2021 – 3 June 2025
- Preceded by: Constituency established
- Succeeded by: Afamasaga Leone Mati
- Constituency: Aʻana Alofi 4
- In office 4 March 2011 – 4 March 2016
- Preceded by: Vaeolenofoafia Tapasu
- Succeeded by: Afamasaga Rico Tupai
- Constituency: Aʻana Alofi 3

Personal details
- Party: Samoa Uniting Party (since 2025)
- Other political affiliations: Tautua Samoa Party (until 2021); Faʻatuatua i le Atua Samoa ua Tasi (2021–2025)

Toeolesulusulu Cedric Schuster is a Samoan environmentalist, politician and former Cabinet Minister. He is a member of the Samoa Uniting Party.

Schuster is from the village of Satapuala. He was educated at the University of Victoria and at Brandeis University in the United States. He has previously worked for the World Wide Fund for Nature, the Samoan government's Division of Environment and Conservation, Seacology, and as an environmental consultant. Schuster is the cousin of fellow former MP Lefau Harry Schuster and the father of swimmer Brandon Schuster. Schuster lost his seat at the 2025 election.

== Political career ==
Schuster was elected to the Legislative Assembly of Samoa at the 2011 Samoan general election, as a candidate for the Tautua Samoa Party. In August 2012 he took part in a roadblock in his village of Satapuala which sought to block access to land the village was claiming. He was subsequently charged with unlawful assembly and obstruction. in August 2013 he was convicted of unlawful assembly, resisting police, obstruction and using foul language and fined US$635. He subsequently apologised to Parliament for the incident.

In April 2014, Schuster became the first Samoan MP to join International Parliamentarians for West Papua.

He lost his seat at the 2016 election.

In October 2020 Schuster announced he would stand as a candidate for the Faʻatuatua i le Atua Samoa ua Tasi (FAST) in the 2021 election. He was elected. On 24 May 2021 he was appointed Minister of Natural Resources and Environment in the elected cabinet of Fiamē Naomi Mataʻafa. The appointment was disputed by the caretaker government. On 23 July 2021 the Court of Appeal ruled that the swearing-in ceremony was constitutional and binding, and that FAST had been the government since 24 May.

On 1 June 2021, while returning from FAST's first-anniversary celebration, Schuster was arrested for drunk-driving. On 3 June he resigned his portfolio, which was later reassigned to prime minister Fiamē Naomi Mata‘afa. On 20 July he pleaded guilty to three traffic offences and applied for a discharge without conviction. On 15 October 2021 he was fined $2,000 and discharged without conviction. He returned to Cabinet on 20 October 2021 as Minister for Natural Resources and Environment and Tourism.

In a cabinet reshuffle on 6 September 2023 he surrendered the tourism portfolio to Prime Minister Fiamē Naomi Mataʻafa, but gained responsibility for the Samoa Trust Estates Corporation and the Samoa Land Corporation.

In December 2023 he was in Dubai as chair of the Alliance of Small Island States for COP28. He was arguing for stringer recognition saying that they "would not sign their own death certificate". In the event the COP28 agreement was made when the Alliance of Small Island States's chief negotiator, Samoan Anna Rasmussen, was not in the room.

On 15 January 2025 Schuster, Prime Minister Mataʻafa, and four other cabinet ministers were expelled from FAST, following a power struggle between Mataʻafa and party chairman Laʻauli Leuatea Schmidt. Schuster and the other expelled members rejected their expulsion, denounced it as unconstitutional, and claimed they were still members of FAST. Prime Minister Mata‘afa called a snap election following the government's budget defeat in parliament on 27 May 2025. Following the dissolution of parliament, Schuster, Mata‘afa and the rest of cabinet confirmed their resignations from FAST and established the Samoa Uniting Party. During the 2025 snap election, Schuster lost his seat to FAST's Afamasaga Leone Mati. Schuster's tenure as a cabinet minister concluded on 16 September, and he was succeeded by Seve Te‘i Fuimaono.

Legislative Assembly of Samoa
Preceded by Vaeolenofoafia Tapasu	Member of Parliament for Aʻana Alofi No. 3; 2011–2016	Succeeded by Afamasaga Rico Tupai
Constituency established	Member of Parliament for Aʻana Alofi No. 4; 2021–2025	Succeeded by Afamasaga Leone Mati
Political offices
Preceded by Tuilaʻepa Saʻilele Malielegaoi	Minister of Natural Resources and Environment; 2021	Succeeded by Fiamē Naomi Mata‘afa
Preceded by Fiamē Naomi Mata‘afa	Minister of Tourism; 2021–2023	Succeeded by Fiamē Naomi Mata‘afa
Preceded by Fiamē Naomi Mata‘afa	Minister of Natural Resources and Environment; 2021–2025	Succeeded by Seve Te‘i Fuimaono
