= Matamua Vasati Pulufana =

Samoan politician

The Honourable Matamua Vasati Pulufana
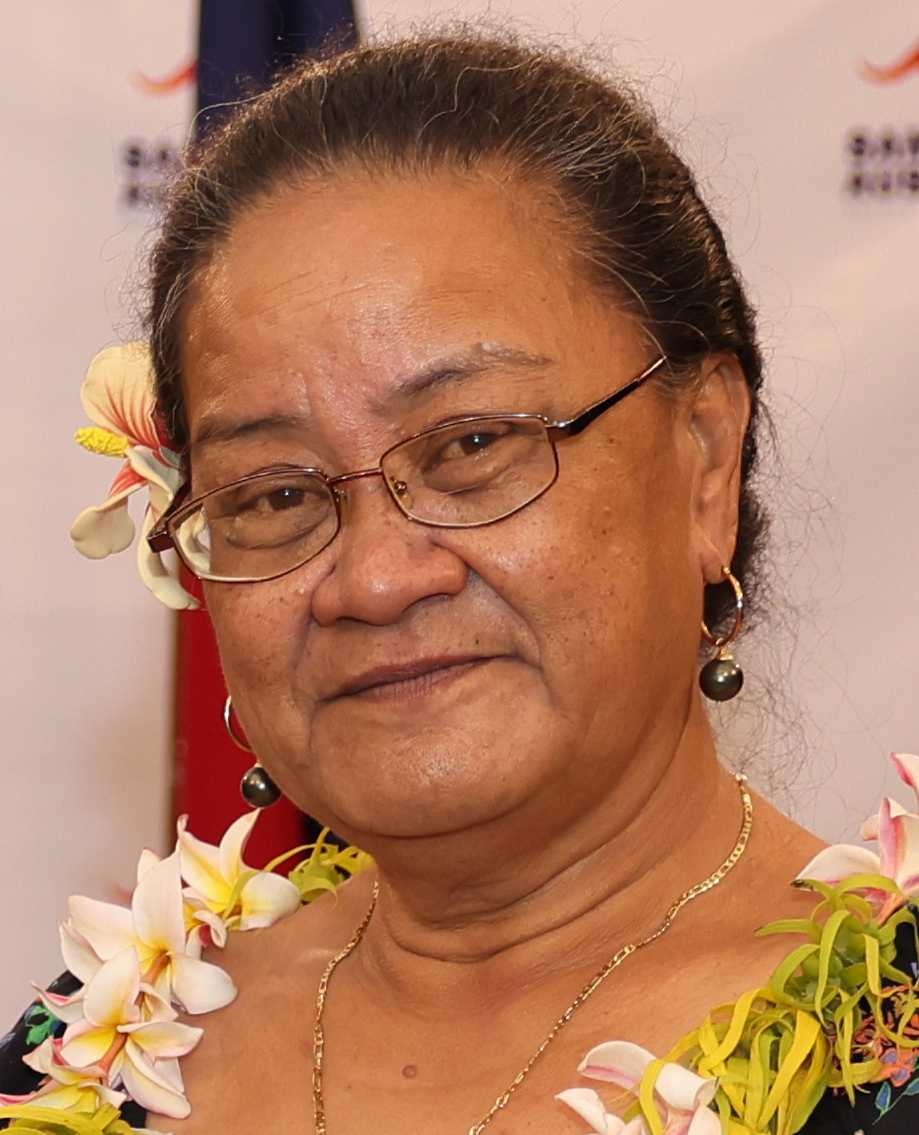

Minister of Justice and Courts Administration
- In office 24 May 2021 – 16 September 2025 (Note: Disputed: 24 May 2021 – 23 July 2021)
- Prime Minister: Fiamē Naomi Mataʻafa
- Preceded by: Faʻaolesa Katopau Ainuʻu
- Succeeded by: Fesolai Apulu Tuigamala

Member of the Samoan Parliament for Faʻasaleleʻaga No. 1
- In office 24 May 2021 – 3 June 2025
- Preceded by: Sili Epa Tuioti
- Succeeded by: Leatigaga Matafai Iiga

Personal details
- Party: Samoa Uniting Party (since 2025)
- Other political affiliations: Faʻatuatua i le Atua Samoa ua Tasi (until 2025)

Matamua Seumanu Vasati Pulufana is a Samoan politician and former Cabinet Minister. She is a member of the Samoa Uniting Party (SUP).

== Career ==
Pulufana was first elected to the Legislative Assembly of Samoa in the 2021 Samoan general election as a Faʻatuatua i le Atua Samoa ua Tasi (FAST) candidate, defeating Finance Minister Sili Epa Tuioti. On 24 May 2021 she was appointed Minister of Justice and Courts Administration in the elected cabinet of Fiamē Naomi Mataʻafa. The appointment was disputed by the caretaker government. On 23 July 2021 the Court of Appeal ruled that the swearing-in ceremony was constitutional and binding, and that FAST had been the government since 24 May.

In December 2021 Pulufana suspended the appointment process for the Deputy President of the Land and Titles Court of Samoa on the grounds that a "drafting error" in the Land and Titles Bill meant that there were no legal provisions for appointments to the court. Attorney-General Suʻa Hellene Wallwork subsequently issued a formal opinion that the lack of appointment provisions meant that no appointments could be made until further legislation had been passed, and that the Komisi o Faʻamasinoga o Fanua ma Suafa, intended to be an appointments and supervisory body for the court, was legally powerless. On this basis, Pulufana ordered the Ministry of Justice and Courts Administration not to progress the appointments in any way. Despite this, on 17 December 2021 Fepuleaʻi purported to swear in Faimalomatumua and two other judges without warrants of appointment from the O le Ao o le Malo, claiming the appointments were "made by God".

Prime Minister Mataʻafa called a snap election following the government's budget defeat in parliament on 27 May 2025. Following the dissolution of parliament, Pulufana, Mata‘afa and the rest of cabinet confirmed their resignations from FAST and established the SUP.

During the 2025 election, Pulufana lost her seat to FAST's Leatigaga Matafai Iiga. Pulufana's tenure as justice minister concluded on 16 September, and she was succeeded by Fesolai Apulu Tuigamala.

== Personal life ==
Pulufana is the wife of former MP Tiata Sili Pulufana and is a former educator.

== Notes ==
Legislative Assembly of Samoa
Preceded by Sili Epa Tuioti	Member of Parliament for Faʻasaleleʻaga No. 1; 2021–2025	Succeeded by Leatigaga Matafai Iiga
Political offices
Preceded by Faʻaolesa Katopau Ainuʻu	Minister of Justice and Courts Administration; 2021–2025	Succeeded by Fesolai Apulu Tuigamala
