= 2026 Safata 1 by-election =

- 27 February 2026
	First party	Second party
Candidate	Tunumafono Clare Tai Tin	Tafafunai Saolotoga Mimio
Party	FAST	FAST
Popular vote	555	553
Percentage	29.90%	29.80%
	Third party	Fourth party
Candidate	Tafafunai Aialiʻi Anapu	Luailepou Tikilapilesa Misi
Party	FAST	HRPP
Popular vote	364	266
Percentage	19.61%	14.33%
MP before election
Seve Teʻi Fuimaono
FAST
Elected MP
Tunumafono Clare Tai Tin
FAST

A by-election to the Legislative Assembly of Samoa was held in the Safata 1 constituency on 27 February 2026. Initially scheduled for 6 February, cabinet postponed the by-election on 15 January without an explanation; the new date was disclosed on 30 January. The by-election was triggered after the Electoral Court voided the election of the previous member, Seve Teʻi Fuimaono of the Faʻatuatua i le Atua Samoa ua Tasi (FAST) party, who was found to have engaged in bribery and treating during the 2025 general election campaign. Four FAST candidates contested the by-election, while Luailepou Tikilapilesa Misi was the sole nominee from the Human Rights Protection Party (HRPP). Tunumafono Clare Tai Tin won the by-election by a close margin, receiving 29% of the vote and defeating FAST party contestant Tafafunai Saolotoga Mimio by two votes. Misi placed fourth with 14% of the vote, behind Tafafunai Aialiʻi Anapu, who received 19%.

== Background ==
Seve Teʻi Fuimaono of the FAST Party won the electorate during the 2025 general election. She defeated the incumbent member, Leaʻana Ronnie Posini of the HRPP, who placed second and the Samoa Uniting Party's Fepuleai Samuelu Taufao. FAST subsequently formed a government under Prime Minister Laʻauli Leuatea Schmidt, and Fuimaono became the minister of natural resources and environment. After the election, Posini filed an electoral petition against Fuimaono, accusing her of having engaged in bribery and treating during the campaign. In response, Fuimaono filed a counter-petition against Posini, also accusing him of corrupt electoral practices. In late November 2025, the electoral court found both of them guilty of corruption, voiding Fuimaono's election and triggering a by-election in the seat. Fuimaono and Posini were subsequently added to the national corrupt list and were not permitted to vote in the by-election. They were also barred from contesting any elections for 10 years.

== Electoral system ==
Elections to all 51 of the directly elected seats in the Legislative Assembly are conducted through the first-past-the-post voting system. Candidates are required to hold a matai title, be at least 21 years old, and have resided in Samoa for a minimum of three years before the nomination date. Individuals convicted of a crime in Samoa or any other country within the previous eight years, and people with a mental illness, were ineligible to stand as candidates. Civil servants were permitted to run as long as they resigned from their positions. Should civil servants fail to do so, the date of filing their candidacy is, by law, deemed to be the point when they relinquish their role.

Universal Suffrage took effect in 1991, permitting all Samoan citizens aged 21 and over the right to vote. Compulsory voting and mandatory voter registration were in place for the by-election. Electors who failed to vote were required to pay 100 tālā, while eligible individuals who did not register on the electoral roll before the deadline were liable to pay a 2000 tālā fine. As Samoa did not employ overseas voting at the time of the by-election, electors enrolled in the Safata 1 constituency were required to be present in the country to vote.

== Candidates ==
The HRPP nominated Luailepou Tikilapilesa Misi of the Saʻanapu and Falelauniu villages, who was previously a building inspector at the ministry of works. Four individuals expressed interest in running as candidates for FAST; however, the party initially announced it would only endorse one contestant. The party ultimately allowed all four parliamentary hopefuls, Tunumafono Clare Tai Tin, Tafafunai Aialiʻi Anapu, Tafafunai Saolotoga Mimio and Tuigamala Vaisilika Tuigamala, to run as FAST candidates.

== Conduct ==
Electoral Commissioner Tuiafelolo John Stanley initially announced that the election would be held on 6 February. Stanley confirmed that the voter roll used for the 2025 general election would remain in place for the by-election. A day before candidate nominations were scheduled to open on 16 January, cabinet postponed the by-election until further notice, without providing a reason. Shortly after, Stanley reiterated that the electoral commission was not a completely independent entity and remained under the control of the executive branch of government. The electoral commission announced on 30 January that the by-election would take place on 27 February. Candidate nominations were open from 9:00 to 16:00 on 6 February, while contestants had until 12 February to withdraw their candidacies if they intended to do so. Pre-polling was held on 25 February, with almost 100 voters casting an early ballot. The by-election writ is scheduled to be returned on 2 March.

== Results ==
Tunumafono Clare Tai Tin, one of the FAST candidates, won the by-election by a narrow margin with 555 votes. Her closest contestant, fellow party member Tafafunai Saolotoga Mimio, received 553 votes, only two less than her. Another FAST contestant, Tafafunai Aialiʻi Anapu, placed third with 364 votes, followed by the HRPP's Luailepou Tikilapilesa Misi, who received 266.

Candidate	Party	Votes	%
Tunumafono Clare Tai Tin	Faʻatuatua i le Atua Samoa ua Tasi	555	29.90
Tafafunai Saolotoga Mimio	Faʻatuatua i le Atua Samoa ua Tasi	553	29.80
Tafafunai Aialiʻi Anapu	Faʻatuatua i le Atua Samoa ua Tasi	364	19.61
Luailepou Tikilapilesa Misi	Human Rights Protection Party	266	14.33
Tuigamala Vaisilika Tuigamala	Faʻatuatua i le Atua Samoa ua Tasi	118	6.36
Total		1,856	100.00
Source: Samoa Observer, OEC
