= Leatinuʻu Wayne Soʻoialo =

Samoan politician

The Honourable Leatinuʻu Wayne Soʻoialo MP
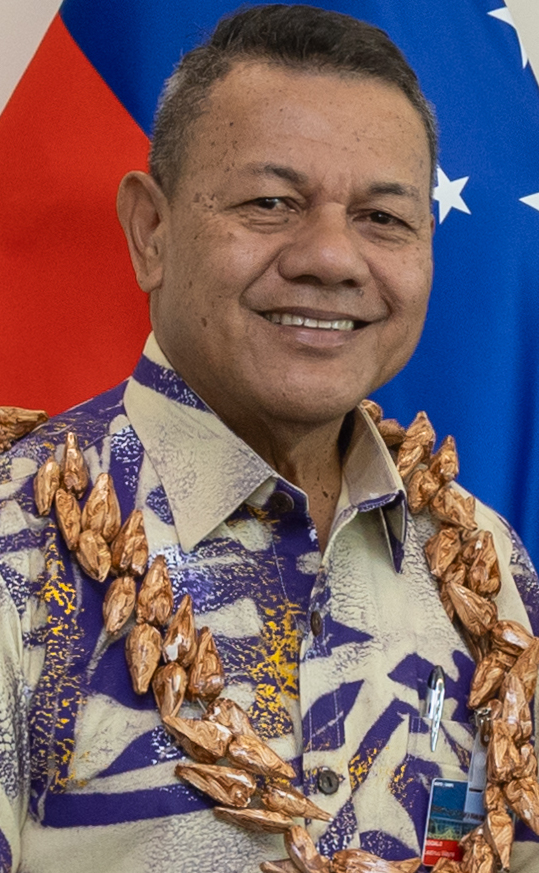
- Soʻoialo in 2023

Minister of Public Enterprises
- In office 24 May 2021 – 16 September 2025 (Note: Disputed: 24 May 2021 – 23 July 2021)
- Prime Minister: Fiamē Naomi Mataʻafa
- Preceded by: Lautafi Fio Selafi Purcell
- Succeeded by: Mulipola Anarosa Ale Molioʻo
Other post
Minister of Commerce, Industry and Labour
In office 4 April 2025 – 16 September 2025
Prime Minister	Fiamē Naomi Mataʻafa
Preceded by	Faleomavaega Titimaea Tafua
Succeeded by	Fata Ryan Schuster
In office 24 May 2021 – 1 October 2023
Prime Minister	Fiamē Naomi Mataʻafa
Preceded by	Lautafi Fio Selafi Purcell
Succeeded by	Leota Laki Lamositele

Member of the Samoan Parliament
- Incumbent
- Assumed office 24 May 2021
- Preceded by: Taefu Lemi
- Constituency: Faleata No. 2
- In office 18 March 2016 – 3 March 2021
- Preceded by: Seat established
- Succeeded by: Seat abolished
- Constituency: Urban West

Personal details
- Born: June 1959 (age 66)
- Party: Samoa Uniting Party (since 2025)
- Other political affiliations: Human Rights Protection Party (until 2020) Independent (2020–2021); Faʻatuatua i le Atua Samoa ua Tasi(2021–2025)

Leatinuʻu Wayne Soʻoialo (also known as Leatinuʻu Faumuina Asi Pauli Wayne Fong) (born June 1959) is a Samoan politician and former Cabinet Minister who served as the minister of Commerce, Labour and Industry from 2021 to 2025.

Soʻoialo worked as a cargo manager for Polynesian Airlines in the United States, before moving to Hawaii. After returning to Samoa he ran a shipping company. He was first elected to the Samoan Parliament in the Urban West seat at the 2016 Samoan general election.

In March 2017 Soʻoialo called for a law change to allow Samoans to gamble in casinos. In October he criticised "dirty politics" within the Human Rights Protection Party (HRPP), alleging that factions were moving against Prime Minister Tuilaʻepa Saʻilele Malielegaoi while he was in hospital in New Zealand. In December he called for a relaxation of border controls with American Samoa. In 2018 he opposed the government's Customary Land Alienation Bill. In June 2019 Soʻoialo criticised the government's budget, claiming it was "unbalanced".

In May 2020 Soʻoialo was asked to leave the HRPP by Prime Minister Tuilaʻepa Saʻilele Malielegaoi over his opposition to Tuilaʻepa's proposed constitutional reforms. In July 2020 he was sacked from the party. He remained in parliament as an independent.

In September 2020 Soʻoialo pledged his loyalty to former Deputy Prime Minister Fiamē Naomi Mataʻafa following her resignation, and promised to follow whichever party she joined in the 2021 election. On 17 October Fong registered to run as a candidate for the Faʻatuatua i le Atua Samoa ua Tasi (FAST) in the 2021 election. As a result his seat was declared vacant under anti-party-hopping provisions. On 14 December 2020 the decision was declared unlawful and invalid by the Supreme Court of Samoa.

Soʻoialo ran in the seat of Faleata No. 2 at the 2021 Samoan general election and was re-elected. On 24 May 2021 he was appointed Minister of Commerce, Industry and Labour in the elected cabinet of Fiamē Naomi Mataʻafa. The appointment was disputed by the caretaker government. On 23 July 2021 the Court of Appeal ruled that the swearing-in ceremony was constitutional and binding, and that FAST had been the government since 24 May.

On 19 December 2022 Soʻoialo was medevaced to New Zealand for treatment for a serious heart condition.

In a cabinet reshuffle on 6 September 2023 he was replaced as Commerce, Industry of Labour minister by Leota Laki Lamositele from 1 October 2023, but retained the Public Enterprises portfolio.

On 15 January 2025 Soʻoialo, Mataʻafa, and four other cabinet ministers were expelled from FAST, following a power struggle between Mata’afa and party chairman Laʻauli Leuatea Polataivao. Soʻoialo re-assumed the portfolio of Commerce, Industry and Labour in April after his predecessor, Faleomavaega Titimaea Tafua, was charged. Prime Minister Mata‘afa called a snap election following the government's budget defeat in parliament on 27 May 2025. Following the dissolution of parliament, Soʻoialo, Mata‘afa and the rest of cabinet confirmed their resignations from FAST and established the Samoa Uniting Party.

He was elected unopposed in the 2025 Samoan general election after successfully challenging the eligibility of both competing candidates. Soʻoialo's tenure as a cabinet minister concluded on 16 September 2025, and he was succeeded by Mulipola Anarosa Ale Molioʻo as public enterprises minister. Fata Ryan Schuster replaced him as commerce minister.

== Notes ==
Legislative Assembly of Samoa
New seat	Member of Parliament for Urban West; 2016–2021	Constituency abolished
Preceded by Taefu Lemi	Member of Parliament for Faleata No. 2; 2021–present	Incumbent
Political offices
Preceded by Lautafi Fio Selafi Purcell	Minister of Commerce, Industry and Labour; 2021–2023	Succeeded by Leota Laki Lamositele
Preceded by Lautafi Fio Selafi Purcell	Minister of Public Enterprises; 2023–2025	Succeeded by Mulipola Anarosa Ale Molioʻo
Preceded by Faleomavaega Titimaea Tafua	Minister of Commerce, Industry and Labour; 2025	Succeeded by Fata Ryan Schuster
