= Magele Sekati Fiaui =

Samoan politician

Member of the Samoa Parliament for Faasaleleaga No. 2
- In office 9 April 2021 – 29 August 2025
- Preceded by: Gatoloaifaana Amataga Alesana-Gidlow
- Succeeded by: Vaaelua Senetenari Samau

Personal details
- Party: Fa'atuatua i le Atua Samoa ua Tasi

Magele Sekati Fiaui (born ~1985) is a Samoan politician and former Member of the Legislative Assembly of Samoa. He is a member of the FAST Party.

Magele is from the village of Iva Savaii. He was first elected to the Legislative Assembly of Samoa in the 2021 Samoan general election, becoming the youngest member of parliament. An election petition against him was unsuccessful. On 28 July 2021 he was appointed Associate Minister of Communications Information and Technology. On 17 January 2025 he was fired as an associate minister by prime minister Fiamē Naomi Mataʻafa after supporting her expulsion from the FAST party.

He lost his seat at the 2025 Samoan general election.
