= Faleomavaega Titimaea Tafua =

Samoan politician and rugby union coach

Faleomavaega Titimaea Tafua MP

Minister of Commerce, Industry and Labour
- In office 15 January 2025 – 3 April 2025
- Prime Minister: Fiamē Naomi Mataʻafa
- Preceded by: Leota Laki Lamositele
- Succeeded by: Leatinuʻu Wayne Soʻoialo

Member of the Samoan Parliament for Aleipata-i-Lalo
- Incumbent
- Assumed office 26 November 2021
- Preceded by: Fiugalu Eteuati Eteuati

Personal details
- Born: 4 October 1947 (age 79)
- Party: Samoa Uniting Party (since 2025)
- Other political affiliations: Faʻatuatua i le Atua Samoa ua Tasi (until 2025)

Faleomavaega Titimaea Tafua
Rugby union career
- Position: Prop
Senior career
Years	Team	Apps	(Points)
- Vaiala
- Marist St. Joseph
- Northern Suburbs Rugby Club
International career
Years	Team	Apps	(Points)
1981-1989	Samoa	18	(4)
Coaching career
- Years: Team
- 2006-2009: Samoa 7s
- 2009-2011: Samoa
- 2017-2018: Samoa

Fuimaono Faleomavaega Titimaea "Dicky" Tafua (born 4 October 1947) is a Samoan former rugby union prop and the former coach of Manu Samoa and the Samoa Sevens rugby team. In November 2021 he was elected to the Legislative Assembly of Samoa. He is the son of former MP Tafua Kalolo and the brother of former MP Tafua Maluelue Tafua.

He took up the position of coach in 2006. He is a former international for Samoa and captained the first Samoa team that played against Wales in 1989. He led Samoa to win their first Wellington sevens and Hong Kong sevens tournament in the 2006/07 season. In February 2009 it was announced that Tafua would coach Manu Samoa, replacing Niko Palamo. His term in the role expired in November 2011.

In June 2014 Tafua was appointed interim coach of the Samoa Sevens. The appointment was made permanent in August 2014. In June 2015 his contract was not renewed.

In September 2017 he was appointed Manu Samoa coach for a second time for a two-year term. In September 2018 his contract was terminated early and the position was readvertised. A subsequent claim for unfair dismissal was dismissed by the court.

== Political career ==
In October 2021 Tafua announced he would be contesting the 2021 Aleipata-Itupa-i-Lalo by-election as a candidate for the FAST Party. He won by over 200 votes.

On 15 January 2025 he was appointed Minister of Commerce, Industry and Labour following the sacking of Leota Laki Lamositele. He supported prime minister Fiamē Naomi Mataʻafa when the FAST party split in February 2025. He resigned as minister in April 2025 after he was charged with dangerous driving following a car crash, and was succeeded by Leatinuʻu Wayne Soʻoialo.

Prime Minister Mata‘afa called a snap election following the government's budget defeat in parliament on 27 May 2025. Tafua ran as a Samoa Uniting Party (SUP) candidate and won re-election in his constituency.

Sporting positions
Preceded by (Samoa) Niko Palamo	Samoa National Rugby Union Coach; 2009–2011	Succeeded by (Samoa) Stephen Betham
Preceded by (New Zealand) Alama Ieremia	Samoa National Rugby Union Coach; 2017–2018	Succeeded by (New Zealand) Steve Jackson
Legislative Assembly of Samoa
Preceded by Fiugalu Eteuati Eteuati	Member of Parliament for Aleipata-i-Lalo; 2021–present	Incumbent
Political offices
Preceded by Leota Laki Lamositele	Minister of Commerce, Industry and Labour; 2025	Succeeded by Leatinuʻu Wayne Soʻoialo
