= Faʻaolesa Katopau Ainuʻu =

Samoan politician (1963–2026)

Afioga Faʻaolesa Katopau Ainuʻu
- Ainuʻu in 2016

Minister of Justice
- In office 18 March 2016 – 24 May 2021
- Prime Minister: Tuilaʻepa Saʻilele Malielegaoi
- Preceded by: Fiamē Naomi Mataʻafa
- Succeeded by: Matamua Vasati Pulufana

Member of the Samoan Parliament for Vaimauga West 2
- In office 4 March 2016 – 9 April 2021
- Preceded by: Lefau Harry Schuster
- Succeeded by: Constituency dissolved

Personal details
- Born: November 1963
- Died: 14 February 2026 (aged 62)
- Party: Human Rights Protection Party (until 2025); Samoa Labour Party (from 2025)

Afioga Faʻaolesa Katopau Ainuʻu (November 1963 – 14 February 2026) was a Samoan lawyer, politician and high chief (matai). He served as Samoa's minister of justice and courts administration from 2016 to 2021, and was a member of the Legislative Assembly of Samoa representing the constituency of Vaimauga West 2. Previously a member of the Human Rights Protection Party (HRPP), he became a founding member of the Samoa Labour Party in 2025.

== Early life and education ==
Ainuʻu was born in November 1963. He was educated at the University of the South Pacific in Suva, Fiji, at U.S. International University in San Diego, California, and at the University of Hawaiʻi.

== Legal and business career ==
Before entering politics, Ainuʻu practised as a barrister and solicitor in both Samoa and American Samoa. He was also the owner of the independent newspaper Samoa Post.

In 2008, he faced legal proceedings in the District Court of American Samoa over allegations related to client funds. An arrest warrant was issued but never served. In 2016, Ainuʻu sought a ruling to quash the warrant, and the case was dismissed, clearing him of all charges.

== Political career ==
Ainuʻu was first elected to the Legislative Assembly of Samoa in the 2016 Samoan general election. Shortly after, he was appointed Minister of Justice and Courts Administration in the cabinet of Prime Minister Tuilaʻepa Saʻilele Malielegaoi.

As minister, Ainuʻu backed controversial legislative changes to the land and titles system. He oversaw the reinstatement of a previously repealed criminal libel law in 2017.

He was also linked to controversies involving the Land and Titles Court of Samoa, including allegations in 2017 that he sought to influence a case, and in 2018 that files concerning his own title were improperly moved from the court to his office—allegations he denied. The Prime Minister later stated the actions were justified, though the Ministry of Justice CEO was suspended and eventually dismissed over the matter.

Ainuʻu lost his seat in the 2021 Samoan general election. In June 2025, he became a founding member of the Samoa Labour Party, established by former HRPP members to advance alternative economic and social policies. During the 2025 snap election, Ainu‘u contested the Vaimauga 4 constituency. He placed fifth with 21 votes, losing to Lima Graeme Tualaulelei of the HRPP.

== Death ==
Ainuʻu died on 14 February 2026, at the age of 62.

Legislative Assembly of Samoa
| Preceded by Lefau Harry Schuster | Member of Parliament for Vaimauga West 2; 2016–2021 | Constituency dissolved |
Political offices
| Preceded by Fiamē Naomi Mataʻafa | Minister of Justice; 2016–2021 | Succeeded by Matamua Vasati Pulufana |
