= Leota Laki Lamositele =

Samoan politician

The Honourable Leota Laki Lamositele

Deputy Leader of Faʻatuatua i le Atua Samoa ua Tasi
- Incumbent
- Assumed office 15 January 2025
- Preceded by: Laʻauli Leuatea Polataivao
- Succeeded by: Titimaea Tafua

Minister of Commerce, Industry of Labour
- In office 1 October 2023 – 14 January 2025
- Prime Minister: Fiamē Naomi Mataʻafa
- Preceded by: Leatinuu Wayne So'oialo

Minister of Women, Community and Social Development
- In office 24 May 2021 (Note: Disputed: 24 May 2021 – 23 July 2021) – 1 October 2023
- Prime Minister: Fiamē Naomi Mataʻafa
- Preceded by: Faumuina Tiatia Liuga
- Succeeded by: Mulipola Anarosa Ale Molioʻo

Member of the Samoan Parliament for Palauli No. 2
- In office 9 April 2021 – 29 August 2025
- Preceded by: Sili Epa Tuioti
- Succeeded by: Fiu Ponifasio Vasa

Personal details
- Party: Faʻatuatua i le Atua Samoa ua Tasi

Leota Laki Lamositele-Sio is a Samoan politician and former Cabinet Minister. He is a member of the FAST Party.

Leota is a statistician, accountant and manager, who served as Director-General of the National Health Services. After running unsuccessfully as an Independent in the 2016 election, he joined the Human Rights Protection Party. In October 2020 he switched his allegiance to the FAST Party to contest the April 2021 Samoan general election. While preliminary results showed him losing to another FAST candidate, the final result showed him ahead by 9 votes, and he was elected to the Legislative Assembly of Samoa.

On 24 May 2021 he was appointed Minister of Women, Community and Social Development in the elected cabinet of Fiamē Naomi Mataʻafa. The appointment was disputed by the caretaker government. On 23 July 2021 the Court of Appeal ruled that the swearing-in ceremony was constitutional and binding, and that FAST had been the government since 24 May. He was subsequently appointed Associate Minister of Finance, the first time an MP had held both ministerial and associate roles.

In a cabinet reshuffle on 6 September 2023 he was replaced as Minister of Women, Community and Social Development by Mulipola Anarosa Ale Molioʻo. Leota was instead appointed Minister of Commerce, Industry of Labour, replacing Leatinuu Wayne So'oialo from 1 October 2023.

On 14 January 2025 he was sacked by prime minister Fiamē Naomi Mataʻafa. On 15 January Mataʻafa was expelled from the FAST party and Leota was elected deputy leader. He was replaced by Titimaea Tafua.

He lost his seat in the 2025 Samoan general election.
