= Tanuvasa =

Tanuvasa is a surname. Notable people with the surname include:

- Agaseata Valelio Tanuvasa (born 1964), Samoan politician
- Keanu Tanuvasa (born 2002), American college football player
- Maa Tanuvasa (born 1970), Samoan gridiron football player
- Salome Tanuvasa (fl. 2012), New Zealand artist
