= Aiono Alec Ekeroma =

Samoan physician and academic

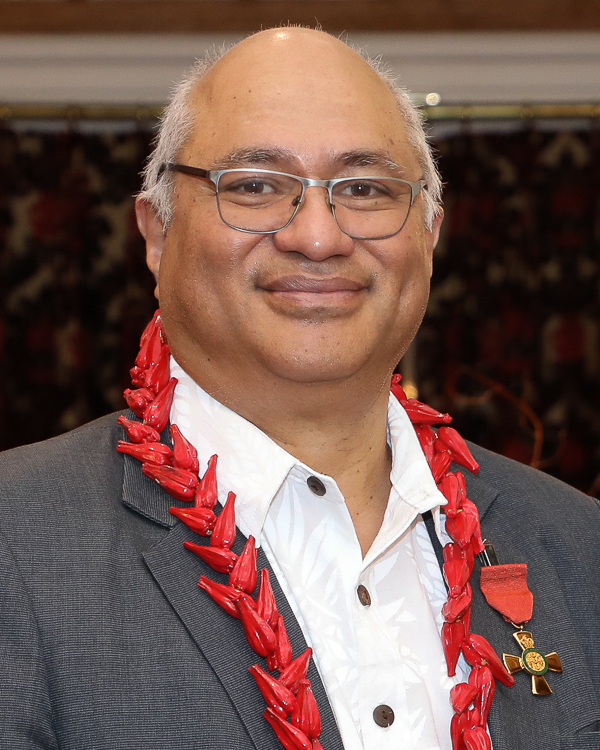
- Ekeroma in 2022

Member of the Samoan Parliament for Aana Alofi No. 2
- Incumbent
- Assumed office 29 August 2025
- Preceded by: Aiono Tile Gafa

Personal details
- Born: born c. 1958
- Party: FAST

Aiono Alec Joseph Ekeroma ONZM (born c. 1958) is a Samoan physician, academic, civil servant, and politician. He was the first Pacific academic to hold a professorial role in a specialised area of medicine in New Zealand. He helped establish the National University of Samoa's medical school, and served as the university's vice-chancellor. In 2025 he was elected to the Legislative Assembly of Samoa.

== Education and academic career ==
Ekeroma was educated at St. Joseph's College in Lotopa before studying medicine at the University of Papua New Guinea. He subsequently graduated with an MBA from Keele University in the United Kingdom. He moved to New Zealand in 1988 for specialist training in Obstetrics and Gynaecology. He subsequently taught at the University of Auckland medical school for 22 years. In 2001 he founded the Pacific Society for Reproductive Health, and in 2015 founded the Pacific Journal of Reproductive Health. In 2017 he completed a PhD at the University of Auckland with a doctoral thesis titled The impact of a health research workshop and other interventions on Pacific Island clinicians’ research productivity. He was subsequently appointed as Head of Department of Obstetrics and Gynaecology at the Wellington School of Medicine, becoming the first pacific academic to hold such a role.

In 2014, he helped develop the curriculum for the National University of Samoa's new school of medicine, and in 2018 he was appointed its founding professor. In October 2019 following the resignation of Fui Asofou So'o, he was appointed vice-chancellor. In July 2021, he was reappointed a University of Otago Honorary Professor.

== Public service career ==
In November 2022, he was appointed chief executive of the Samoan Ministry of Health.

== Political career ==
In June 2025 Aiono resigned from his position as chief executive of the Ministry of Health in order to contest the 2025 Samoan general election as a candidate for the FAST party. He was elected to the Legislative Assembly of Samoa.

== Recognition ==
In the 2020 Queen's Birthday Honours, Ekeroma was appointed an Officer of the New Zealand Order of Merit, for services to health and the Pacific community.

In 2009, he was bestowed with the Aiono title from Fasito'o Uta, but this was challenged before the land and Titles Court of Samoa. The title was formally bestowed again in August 2020 once the challenge had been resolved.
