= Fesolai Apulu Tuigamala =

Samoan politician

Member of the Samoa Parliament for Aana Alofi No. 1
- Incumbent
- Assumed office 9 April 2021
- Preceded by: Tuitama Talalelei Tuitama

Personal details
- Party: Fa'atuatua i le Atua Samoa ua Tasi

Fesolai Apulu Tusiupu Tuigamala is a Samoan politician. He is a member of the FAST Party.

Fesolai was first elected to the Legislative Assembly of Samoa in the 2021 Samoan general election. Following the election an election petition against him was withdrawn. On 28 July 2021 he was appointed Associate Minister of Justice and Courts Administration. In his opening speech he called for overseas Samoans to be allowed to vote.

On 17 January 2025 he was fired as an associate minister by prime minister Fiamē Naomi Mataʻafa after supporting her expulsion from the FAST party.

He was re-elected at the 2025 Samoan general election.
