= Pauga Talalelei Pauga =

Samoan politician

Member of the Samoan Parliament for Vaimauga No. 1
- Incumbent
- Assumed office 29 August 2025
- Preceded by: Sulamanaia Tauiliili Tuivasa

Personal details
- Born: March 30, 1969 (age 57)
- Party: FAST

Pauga Talalelei Pauga (born 30 March 1969) is a Samoan accountant, sports administrator, and politician, who served as president of the Samoa Association of Sports and National Olympic Committee from 2021 to 2025. He is a member of the FAST Party.

Pauga was educated at the University of Auckland and works as an accountant. He played for the Samoa men's national basketball team in 2011. He served as president of the National Samoa Basketball Association and as a board member of FIBA Oceania. In 2021 he was elected president of the Samoa Association of Sports and National Olympic Committee (SASNOC).

After completing his term as SASNOC president in April 2025 Pauga announced he would stand for election as a candidate for the FAST Party. He ran in the Vaimauga No.1 electorate in the 2025 Samoan general election and was elected to the Legislative Assembly.
