= Lefau Harry Schuster =

Samoan politician

The Honourable Lefau Harry Schuster
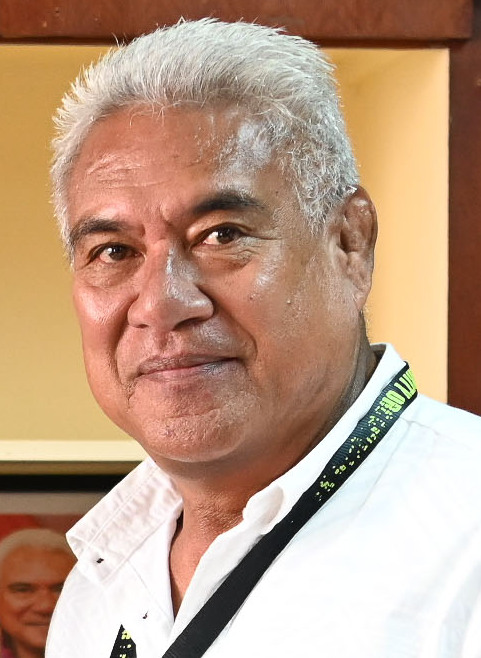
- Schuster in 2022

Minister of Police and Prisons
- In office 24 May 2021 – 16 September 2025 (Note: Disputed: 24 May 2021 – 23 July 2021)
- Prime Minister: Fiamē Naomi Mataʻafa
- Preceded by: Tialavea Tionisio Hunt
- Succeeded by: Laʻauli Leuatea Schmidt

Member of the Samoan Parliament
- In office 9 April 2021 – 3 June 2025
- Preceded by: Constituency established
- Succeeded by: Lima Graeme Tualaulelei
- Constituency: Vaimauga No. 4
- In office 4 March 2011 – 4 March 2016
- Preceded by: Anauli Pofitu Fesili
- Succeeded by: Constituency dissolved
- Constituency: Vaimauga West

Personal details
- Party: Samoa Uniting Party (since 2025)
- Other political affiliations: Faʻatuatua i le Atua Samoa ua Tasi (2020–2025); Tautua Samoa (until 2020)

Lefau Harry Schuster (also known as Faualo Harry Schuster) is a Samoan politician who served as minister of police and prisons from 2021 to 2025. He is a member of the Samoa Uniting Party and was a founding member of the Tautua Samoa Party. He is the cousin of fellow former MP Toeolesulusulu Cedric Schuster. During the 2025 snap election, Schuster lost re-election in his seat of Vaimauga No. 4 to Lima Graeme Tualaulelei of the Human Rights Protection Party (HRPP).

== Early life ==
Schuster was educated at St Joseph's College in Samoa and St Paul's College, Auckland before studying law at Victoria University of Wellington. He worked for the New Zealand Ministry of Education before returning to Samoa to work in the Attorney General’s office. After time in private practice, he was appointed as a District Court Judge in 2000 before resigning in 2010 to enter politics. He has also served as president of the Federation of Oceania Rugby Unions.

In September 2018 he was awarded the Faualo title by his village.

== Political career ==
Schuster was elected to the Legislative Assembly of Samoa at the 2011 Samoan general election, as a candidate for Tautua. He lost his seat at the 2016 election.

In July 2020 Schuster criticised new electoral laws limiting candidate eligibility as unfair and discriminatory. In October 2020 Schuster announced he would stand as a candidate for the F.A.S.T. Party in the 2021 election. He was elected in the Vaimauga no. 4 constituency. On 24 May 2021 he was appointed Minister of Police and Prisons in the elected cabinet of Fiamē Naomi Mataʻafa. The appointment was disputed by the caretaker government. On 23 July 2021 the Court of Appeal ruled that the swearing-in ceremony was constitutional and binding, and that FAST had been the government since 24 May.

In his role as Minister in charge of the Electoral Commission Schuster advocated for electoral reform, including the repeal of "arbitrary" restrictions on candidacy and on MPs changing parties. As Police Minister he was critical of the impact of the Land and Titles Bill, claiming that it had led to village councils abusing their authority to violate human rights.

On 15 January 2025 Schuster, Prime Minister Mataʻafa, and four other cabinet ministers were expelled from FAST, following a power struggle between Mataʻafa and party chairman Laʻauli Leuatea Schmidt. Schuster and the other expelled members rejected their expulsion, denounced it as unconstitutional, and claimed they were still members of FAST. Schuster argued they could only depart from the party if they were to leave voluntarily or if a court upheld their expulsion. Prime Minister Mata‘afa called a snap election following the government's budget defeat in parliament on 27 May 2025. Following the dissolution of parliament, Schuster, Mata‘afa and the rest of cabinet confirmed their resignations from FAST and established the Samoa Uniting Party.

During the 2025 snap election, Schuster lost his seat to Lima Graeme Tualaulelei of the HRPP. Schuster's tenure as a cabinet minister ended on 16 September, and Schmidt succeeded him as police and prisons minister.

== Notes ==
Legislative Assembly of Samoa
Preceded by Anauli Pofitu Fesili	Member of Parliament for Vaimauga West; 2011–2016	Constituency dissolved
New constituency	Member of Parliament for Vaimauga No. 4; 2021–2025	Succeeded by Lima Graeme Tualaulelei
Political offices
Preceded by Tialavea Tionisio Hunt	Minister of Police and Prisons; 2021–2025	Succeeded by Laʻauli Leuatea Schmidt
