= Sulamanaia Tauiliili Tuivasa =

Samoan politician

Member of the Samoa Parliament for Vaimauga No. 1
- In office 4 March 2016 – 29 August 2025
- Preceded by: Tuisugaletaua Sofara Aveau
- Succeeded by: Pauga Talalelei Pauga

Personal details
- Party: Human Rights Protection Party

Sulamanaia Fetaiai Tauiliili Tuivasa is a Samoan politician and former Member of the Legislative Assembly of Samoa. He is a member of the Human Rights Protection Party.

Tuivasa is a former public servant for the Ministry of Revenue. He is married to Nive Tauiliili a Certified Accountant with seven children. He was first elected to the Legislative Assembly of Samoa in the 2016 election, defeating Cabinet Minister Tuisugaletaua Sofara Aveau. In 2019, he accused the HRPP government of interfering in public service appointments. Later that year, he voted against removing Lands & Titles Court President Fepuleai Atila Ropati from office. He was re-elected in the 2021 election. On 4 May 2022, Sulamanaia was suspended from parliament for a day for raising his voice during a heated argument. He then was called back to Parliament the following day.

He lost his seat in the 2025 Samoan general election.
