= Fiu Ponifasio Vasa =

Samoan politician

Member of the Samoan Parliament for Palauli No. 2
- Incumbent
- Assumed office 29 August 2025
- Preceded by: Leota Laki Lamositele

Personal details
- Party: Independent

Fiu Faaolatane Ponifasio Vasa is a Samoan civil servant and politician.

Fiu worked as head of the Births, Marriage and Death Office.

He ran as an independent in the 2025 Samoan general election, though with the endorsement and backing of the FAST Party. He was elected to the Legislative Assembly after winning his seat by a single vote.
