= Seuamuli Fasi Toma =

Samoan politician

Member of the Samoa Parliament for Gagaemauga No. 2
- Incumbent
- Assumed office 9 April 2021
- Preceded by: Faasootauloa Pati Taulapapa

Personal details
- Party: Fa'atuatua i le Atua Samoa ua Tasi

Seuamuli Fasi Toma (born ~1964) is a Samoan politician. He is a member of the FAST Party.

Seuamuli was born on Savai'i and is a farmer and lay preacher. He was first elected to the Legislative Assembly of Samoa in the 2021 Samoan general election, defeating former Deputy Speaker Nafoitoa Talaimanu Keti. On 28 July 2021 he was appointed Associate Minister of Women, Community and Development. On 17 January 2025 he was fired as an associate minister by prime minister Fiamē Naomi Mataʻafa after supporting her expulsion from the FAST party.
