= Masinalupe Makesi Masinalupe =

Samoan politician

Member of the Samoa Parliament for Lefaga and Faleaseela
- Incumbent
- Assumed office 9 April 2021
- Preceded by: Toleafoa Ken Vaafusuaga Poutoa

Personal details
- Born: Lefaga
- Party: Fa'atuatua i le Atua Samoa ua Tasi

Masinalupe Makesi Masinalupe (born ~1961) is a Samoan politician. He is a member of the Fa'atuatua i le Atua Samoa ua Tasi.

Masinalupe was born in Lefaga and educated at Safa'ato'a Primary School, Lefaga Junior High School and Leulumoega College. He trained as a mechanic, and worked as a mechanic and manager before starting his own transport company, where he drove one of his own buses.

He was first elected to the Legislative Assembly of Samoa in the April 2021 Samoan general election, winning the seat of Lefaga and Faleaseela. On 28 July 2021 he was appointed Associate Minister of Customs. On 17 January 2025 he was fired as an associate minister by prime minister Fiamē Naomi Mataʻafa after supporting her expulsion from the FAST party.
