= Agaseata Valelio Tanuvasa =

Samoan politician

Member of the Samoa Parliament for Aana Alofi No. 3
- Incumbent
- Assumed office 9 April 2021
- Preceded by: Ili Setefano Taʻateo

Personal details
- Party: Fa'atuatua i le Atua Samoa ua Tasi

Agaseata Valelio Tanuvasa (born ~1964) is a Samoan politician and member of the Legislative Assembly of Samoa. He is a member of the FAST Party.

Tanuvasa is from Nofoali'i and was educated at Nofoalii Primary School and Avele College. He trained as a teacher, and served as principal of Nofoalii Primary School for ten years. He was first elected to the Legislative Assembly of Samoa in the April 2021 Samoan general election. On 28 July 2021 he was appointed Associate Minister of Education. On 17 January 2025 he was fired as an associate minister by prime minister Fiamē Naomi Mataʻafa after supporting her expulsion from the FAST party.

He was re-elected at the 2025 Samoan general election.
