= Samoa Land Corporation =

- Fa’alapotopotoga o Eleele Tumaoti a Samoa

Agency overview
- Formed: 1990
- Minister responsible: Minister of Public Enterprises
- Agency executive: Ulugia Petelo Kavesi, General Manager

The Samoa Land Corporation is a government-owned company based in Samoa. The corporation was established in 1990 to divest 24,000 acres (9,700 ha) of land previously owned by the Western Samoa Trust Estates Corporation on a commercial basis to generate revenue for the government. The corporation is structured as a company under the Companies Act 1955.

The corporation's work has been controversial. Some of the land owned by the corporation was taken during the colonial era and is claimed as customary land by village councils. In 1997 villagers in Vaiusu fired on police in a dispute over alienation of customary land by the corporation. In 2012 the village of Satapuala petitioned for the return of its land, arguing that it had been stolen by the German and then New Zealand administrations.

In 2013 a parliamentary committee found that the corporation had engaged in overspending and "corrupt practices" to disguise payments to a local businessman, and recommended legal action against those responsible. In 2014 a parliamentary committee found that the Samoan government should not have transferred 18,500 acres (7,500 ha) of land to the corporation. In 2019 the Auditor-General found that a debt of $15.9 million owed by the government to the corporation over a land exchange had not been followed up on by the corporation and that lease arrears had not been pursued.

In 2014 the corporation moved out of its headquarters at Tuanaimato. The building failed to find a tenant and sat empty for three years, and in 2017 the corporation moved back in.
