= Leaʻana Ronnie Posini =

Samoan politician

Member of the Samoan Parliament for Safata No. 1
- In office 4 March 2016 – 3 June 2025
- Preceded by: New constituency
- Succeeded by: Seve Teʻi Fuimaono

Personal details
- Party: Human Rights Protection Party

Leaʻana Ronnie Posini is a Samoan politician and former Member of the Legislative Assembly of Samoa. He is a member of the Human Rights Protection Party.

He was first elected to the Legislative Assembly of Samoa in the 2016 Samoan general election. An electoral petition against him by the unsuccessful candidate Palusalue Faʻapo II was withdrawn before going to trial.

In July 2019, he was one of 18 MPs who voted in support of Lands & Titles Court President Fepuleai Atila Ropati, who had been convicted for assault, retaining his position.

He was re-elected at the 2021 Samoan general election. On 12 July 2021, he agreed to resign from parliament as part of the settlement of an election petition. He subsequently changed his mind, and the petition against him was later withdrawn. In November 2022, he was banished from his village of Saanapu by the village council.

He lost his seat at the 2025 Samoan general election.
