= Taefu Lemi =

Samoan politician

Taefu Lemi Taefu

Member of the Samoa Parliament for Falelatai and Samatau
- In office 4 March 2011 – 9 April 2021
- Preceded by: Misa Telefoni
- Succeeded by: Lupematasila Tologata Tile Leia

Personal details
- Party: Human Rights Protection Party

Taefu Lemi Taefu is a Samoan politician and former Member of the Legislative Assembly of Samoa. He is a member of the Human Rights Protection Party.

Taefu was educated at La Trobe University in Melbourne, Australia, graduating with a bachelor's degree in economics and accounting in 1991. He worked as an accountant, as a tax inspector, and for the National University of Samoa and University of the South Pacific before entering politics.

He was first elected to parliament in the 2011 election and appointed Associate Minister of Justice. He was re-elected in the 2016 election and appointed Associate Minister of Natural Resources and Environment. While an MP he served as chair of the Samoan chapter of the Global Organization of Parliamentarians Against Corruption. With other MPs he also trained as a lawyer, graduating with a Certificate in Civil Law from the University of the South Pacific. He lost his seat in the 2021 election.
