= Lupematasila Tologata Tile Leia =

Samoan politician

Member of the Samoa Parliament for Falelatai and Samatau
- Incumbent
- Assumed office 9 April 2021
- Preceded by: Taefu Lemi

Personal details
- Party: Human Rights Protection Party

Lupematasila Galumalemana Tologata Togia Tile Leia (born ~1964) is a Samoan politician. He is a member of the Human Rights Protection Party.

Lupematasila was educated at Avele College, the Papua New Guinea University of Technology, La Trobe University in Australia and Massey University in New Zealand. He joined the Electric Power Corporation in 1987 and in 2011 was appointed General Manager. He was first elected to the Legislative Assembly of Samoa in the 2021 Samoan general election.
