= Samoa Uniting Party =

Political party in Samoa

Samoa Uniting Party Samoa Ua Potopoto
- Abbreviation: SUP
- Leader: Fiamē Naomi Mataʻafa
- Founded: 30 May 2025
- Split from: Faʻatuatua i le Atua Samoa ua Tasi
- Colours: Green; Yellow
- Legislative Assembly: 3 / 51

Website
- samoaunitingparty.ws

The Samoa Uniting Party (Samoan: Samoa Ua Potopoto) is a political party in Samoa. It is led by Fiamē Naomi Mataʻafa.

The party was registered on 30 May 2025. It was created as a vehicle for Fiamē and her cabinet following the split in the FAST party and the collapse of the FAST government in May 2025. All 14 cabinet ministers and former minister Titimaea Tafua agreed to run under the party's banner.

The party was formally launched on 5 June. It launched its manifesto on 15 July.

The party ran 26 candidates and won 3 seats in the 2025 general election, five short of being able to sit as its own bloc in parliament.

== Logo ==
Each of the 5 hands on the logo represent different groups of people. The left most hand represents the mothers, the top, the fathers, the one missing a finger, the persons with disabilities. The bottom one (with calluses) is for the working class like fisherman and farmers. The smallest one is for the youth of Samoa. The hands are arranged in the Southern cross star cluster like on Samoa's flag.

== Election results ==
=== Legislative Assembly elections ===
Election	Leader	Votes	%	Seats	+/–	Rank	Status
2025	Fiamē Naomi Mataʻafa	7,746	8.62	3 / 51	New	3rd	Opposition
