= Fiamē Naomi Mataʻafa =

Prime Minister of Samoa from 2021 to 2025

The Honourable Afioga Fiamē Naomi Mataʻafa MP
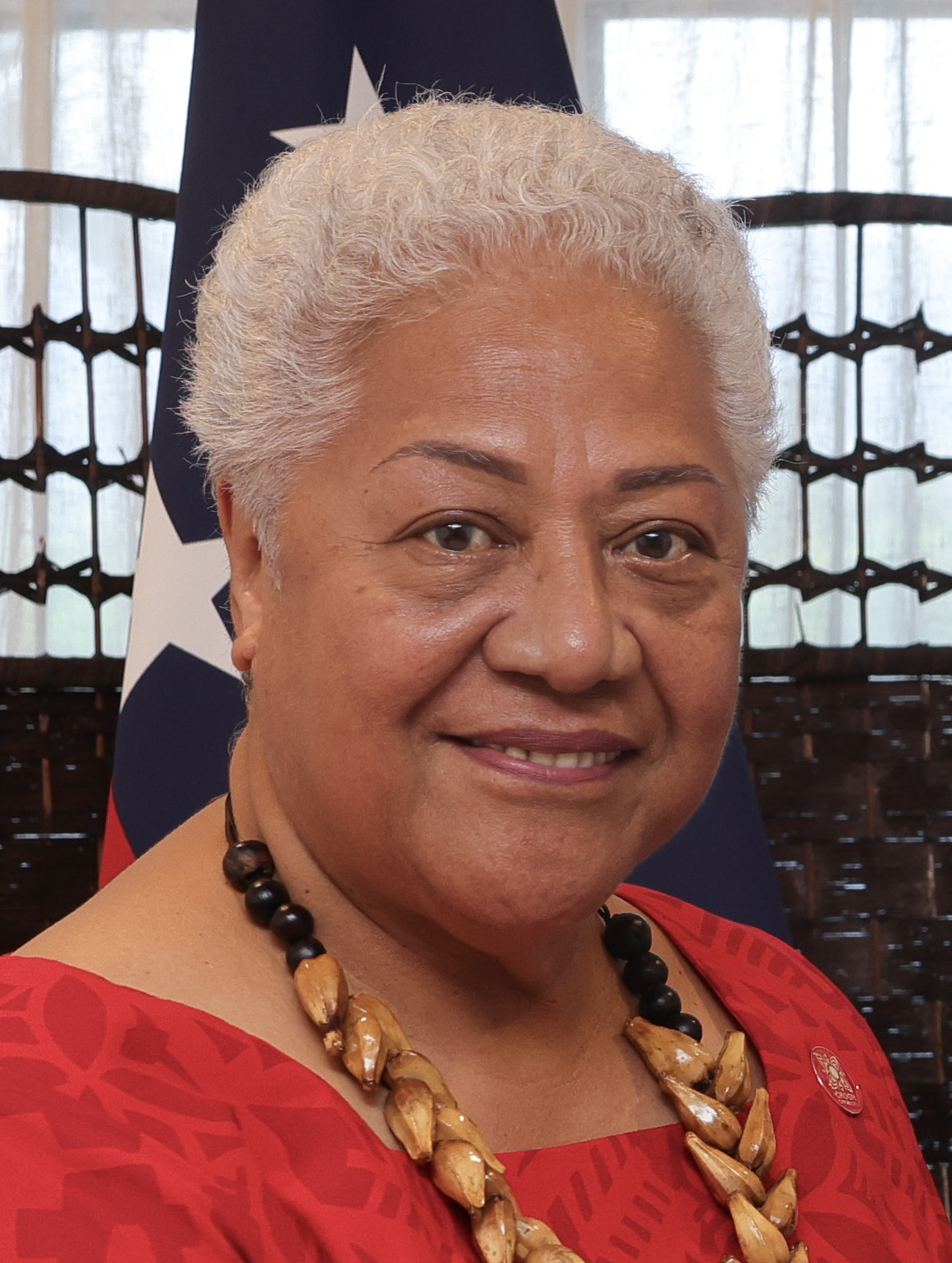
- Mataʻafa in 2024

7th Prime Minister of Samoa
- In office 24 May 2021 – 16 September 2025 (Note: Disputed: 24 May – 23 July 2021)
- O le Ao o le Malo: Tuimalealiʻifano Vaʻaletoʻa Sualauvi II
- Deputy: Tuala Iosefo Ponifasio
- Preceded by: Tuilaʻepa Saʻilele Malielegaoi
- Succeeded by: Laʻauli Leuatea Schmidt

Deputy Prime Minister of Samoa
- In office 19 March 2016 – 11 September 2020
- Prime Minister: Tuilaʻepa Saʻilele Malielegaoi
- Preceded by: Fonotoe Pierre Lauofo
- Succeeded by: Tuala Iosefo Ponifasio
Other cabinet posts
Minister of Natural Resources and Environment
In office 3 June 2021 – 20 October 2021
Prime Minister	Herself
Preceded by	Toeolesulusulu Cedric Schuster (Note: Disputed with Tuilaʻepa Saʻilele Malielegaoi)
Succeeded by	Toeolesulusulu Cedric Schuster
In office 19 March 2016 – 11 September 2020
Prime Minister	Tuilaʻepa Saʻilele Malielegaoi
Preceded by	Faamoetauloa Ulaitino Faale Tumaalii
Succeeded by	Tuilaʻepa Saʻilele Malielegaoi
Minister of Justice
In office 21 March 2011 – 18 March 2016
Prime Minister	Tuilaʻepa Saʻilele Malielegaoi
Preceded by	Unasa Mesi Galo
Succeeded by	Faaolesa Katopau Ainuu
Minister of Women, Community and Social Development
In office 24 April 2006 – 21 March 2011
Prime Minister	Tuilaʻepa Saʻilele Malielegaoi
Preceded by	Tuala Ainiu Iusitino
Succeeded by	Tolofuaivalelei Falemoe Leiʻataua
Minister of Education
In office 15 May 1991 – 24 April 2006
Prime Minister	Tofilau Eti Alesana; Tuilaʻepa Saʻilele Malielegaoi
Succeeded by	Toomata Alapati Poese
Party posts
Leader of the Samoa Uniting Party
Incumbent
Assumed office 30 May 2025
Preceded by	Party established
Leader of Faʻatuatua i le Atua Samoa ua Tasi
In office 9 March 2021 – 15 January 2025
Deputy	Laʻauli Leuatea Schmidt
Preceded by	Laʻauli Leuatea Schmidt
Succeeded by	Laʻauli Leuatea Schmidt
Deputy Leader of the Human Rights Protection Party
In office 6 March 2015 – 11 September 2020
Leader	Tuilaʻepa Saʻilele Malielegaoi
Preceded by	Fonotoe Pierre Lauofo
Succeeded by	Fonotoe Pierre Lauofo

17th Commonwealth Chair-in-Office
- In office 25 October 2024 – 16 September 2025
- Preceded by: Paul Kagame
- Succeeded by: Laʻauli Leuatea Schmidt

Member of the Samoan Parliament for Lotofaga
- Incumbent
- Assumed office 22 February 1985
- Preceded by: Asiasiau Sausoo

Personal details
- Born: Naomi Mataʻafa; 29 April 1957 (age 69) Apia, Western Samoa Trust Territory (now Samoa)
- Party: SUP (since 2025)
- Other political affiliations: HRPP (1985–2020); Independent (2020–2021); FAST (2021–2025)
- Parents: Fiamē Mataʻafa Faumuina Mulinuʻu II (father); Laʻulu Fetauimalemau Mataʻafa (mother)
- Education: Victoria University of Wellington

Afioga Fiamē Naomi Mataʻafa (pronounced [afɪoŋa fɪameː naomɪ mataʔafa]; born 29 April 1957) is a Samoan politician and High Chief (matai) who served as the seventh Prime Minister of Samoa from 2021 to 2025. She has led the Samoa Uniting Party (SUP) since 2025.

The daughter of Samoa's first prime minister Fiamē Mataʻafa Faumuina Mulinuʻu II, Mataʻafa is the first woman to serve as Samoa's head of government. A member of the Human Rights Protection Party (HRPP) until 2020, she was the first woman appointed to Cabinet in Samoa's history. Mataʻafa was the Minister of Education from 1991 to 2006 in the governments of prime ministers Tofilau Eti Alesana and Tuilaʻepa Saʻilele Malielegaoi. In addition, she was the Minister of Women from 2006 to 2011 and Minister of Justice from 2011 to 2016. Mataʻafa served as Samoa's first female deputy prime minister and deputy leader of the HRPP from 2016 to 2020, resigning in opposition to the controversial Land and Titles Bill. The following year she joined the newly founded Faʻatuatua i le Atua Samoa ua Tasi (FAST) party and was unanimously elected its leader in March 2021.

FAST secured a majority after the 2021 election, but defeated Prime Minister Malielegaoi refused to leave office, leading to the 2021 Samoan constitutional crisis. The crisis was resolved by Samoa's Court of Appeal on 23 July 2021, which ruled that Mataʻafa had been Prime Minister since 24 May.

Mata‘afa led FAST party from 2021 until her removal in January 2025, after dismissing the party chairman and deputy leader Laʻauli Leuatea Schmidt from cabinet. She and four other cabinet ministers, including Deputy Prime Minister Tuala Iosefo Ponifasio, were expelled from the party. Mata‘afa and the ousted ministers rejected the expulsion as unlawful and initially claimed they were still FAST members. After parliament rejected the government's budget on 27 May, Mataʻafa advised the O le Ao o le Malo to dissolve parliament and call a snap election. Shortly after, Mata‘afa and her cabinet announced they had left FAST, and established the SUP. During the snap election, the SUP won only three seats. Schmidt succeeded her as prime minister on 16 September.

== Early life and education ==
Fiamē Naomi Mataʻafa was born Naomi Mataʻafa on 29 April 1957 in Apia to high chief Fiamē Mataʻafa Faumuina Mulinuʻu II who later served as Samoa's first prime minister and his wife, Laʻulu Fetauimalemau Mataʻafa. Mataʻafa was born five years before Samoa gained independence from New Zealand. She has three older siblings from her father's previous relationships. Hailing from a prominent lineage of Matai, Fiamē grew up in Apia until age 11. She subsequently attended Samuel Marsden Collegiate School in Wellington, New Zealand.

Mataʻafa began studying at Victoria University of Wellington in 1976. Her father had died the previous year. However, in early 1977 Mataʻafa's studies were put on hold when she returned to Samoa to claim her late father's Matai title. Numerous relatives were competing for the Fiamē title in court. Interrogated longer than any other candidate, she formally gained the Fiamē title in 1978. It was considered unusual for a single young woman (then 20 years old) like Mataʻafa to have a matai title. Afterwards, she returned to New Zealand and resumed her studies until a month later, when she had to return to Samoa to defend her title from relatives claiming that she was an 'absentee Matai'. Mataʻafa continued her higher education in 1979.

== Political career ==
Mataʻafa joined the HRPP in 1985 and was first elected to parliament that year, representing the constituency of Lotofaga previously held by her mother, Tolofuaivalelei Falemoe Leiʻataua. She has been re-elected in every election since, and is one of the longest-serving members of Parliament. During the 1988 election, Mataʻafa initially lost re-election to her Lotofaga seat and came second but remained a member of parliament due to the controversial disqualification of the victor, Fata Siaosi. Siaosi's victory was declared invalid as he had not registered his Matai title with the Land and Titles Court. Although a subsequent trial saw him regain his title, Siaosi did not gain the Lotofaga seat. Mataʻafa later reflected that initially losing reminded her to "never to take [getting elected] for granted". On 15 May 1991 she was appointed Minister of education, becoming Samoa's first female cabinet minister. She held that position until 2006, when she was appointed Minister of Women, Community & Social Development. From 2011 to 2016 she served as Minister of Justice.

Mataʻafa has represented Samoa on the executive board of UNESCO. From 2006 to 2012 she served as Pro-Chancellor and Chairperson of the University of the South Pacific. She is currently president of the Samoa National Council of Women.

=== Deputy prime minister (2016−2020) ===
In March 2016, Mataʻafa was elected deputy leader of the Human Rights Protection Party (HRPP), defeating Faumuina Tiatia Liuga in a caucus vote. On 19 March 2016, she was sworn in as Samoa's first female deputy prime minister. She was also appointed Minister of Natural Resources and Environment.

In 2018 while Minister of Natural Resources and Environment, she launched the Women in Climate Change Initiative (WiCC) of which she is the Patron.

On 10 September 2020, Mataʻafa was publicly rebuked by Prime Minister Tuilaʻepa Saʻilele Malielegaoi after announcing that she would follow the wishes of her constituency and vote against the controversial Constitution Amendment Bill, Land and Titles Bill, and Judicature Bill. On 11 September 2020 she resigned from Cabinet. Following her resignation she was invited by the Faʻatuatua i le Atua Samoa ua Tasi (FAST) party to become its leader. She declined as she wished to complete the parliamentary term. On 13 January 2021, Mataʻafa announced that she would be joining FAST after Parliament has risen for the election. In March 2021 Mataʻafa was elected to lead FAST.

== 2021 Samoan general election ==
During the 2021 general election held on 9 April 2021, Mataʻafa was re-elected to her Lotofaga seat unopposed. Preliminary results from the general election indicated that FAST had secured 23 seats, HRPP 24 and Tautua Samoa and an independent both winning one seat. An accounting error was detected in the Vaimauga No. 2 constituency, which had incorrectly displayed the Tautua Samoa candidate leading ahead of the HRPP candidate. This subsequently showed the results for FAST and the HRPP tied with 25 seats each, and first term Independent MP Tuala Iosefo Ponifasio holding the balance of power. Official results still showed FAST and the HRPP tied.

== 2021 constitutional crisis ==
After the election, FAST negotiated with Ponifasio about him either entering a coalition with FAST or joining the party altogether. Ponifasio agreed to join FAST on 21 April giving FAST 26 seats. However, a day before his announcement, the Samoan Electoral Commission announced that the 10% female quota in parliament had not been met. An extra seat was added in parliament going to the HRPP, resulting in a hung parliament with both FAST and the HRPP deadlocked with 26 seats each. FAST decided to challenge the decision in court. On 3 May, Mataʻafa urged Prime Minister Malielegaoi to concede defeat.

On the evening of 4 May 2021, O le Ao Mamalu o le Malo (Head of State) Tuimalealiʻifano Vaʻaletoʻa Sualauvi II announced that new elections would take place on 21 May to resolve the deadlock. Mataʻafa and FAST opposed fresh elections, stating that the decision "pre-empts" the Supreme Court ruling on the extra parliamentary seat scheduled for 5 May. She has also said that the O le Ao o le Malo's call was "unconstitutional" as all options to break the deadlock had yet not been exhausted. On 5 May, Mataʻafa announced that FAST would challenge the decision in court.

On 17 May, the Supreme Court of Samoa ruled that the creation of a new seat was unconstitutional, giving FAST a majority in parliament. The court subsequently overturned the voiding of the 9 April election results and declared that the call for a new election had no legal authority, and ordered parliament to convene within 45 days of the original polling. Thus paving way for FAST to form a new government and for Fiamē to assume the prime ministership.

From 24 May to 23 July 2021, her position as Prime Minister was disputed by Tuilaʻepa Saʻilele Malielegaoi who refused to concede power and locked her out along with her party's MPs from entering the legislative building, despite the ruling of the Supreme Court of Samoa. Her party denounced the move as a "coup". Subsequently, in a tent in parliament's gardens, Mata'afa was sworn into office as Samoa's first female prime minister. The Federated States of Micronesia became the first country to recognise her as the legitimate Prime Minister of Samoa. Her government was also later recognised by Palau and the Marshall Islands. Malielegaoi accused Mataʻafa of treason.

On 23 July 2021 the Court of Appeal ruled that the swearing-in ceremony was constitutional and binding, and that FAST had been the government since 24 May. Three days later on the 26 July, Malielegaoi conceded defeat, ending the constitutional crisis.

Police dismissed a complaint against Mataʻafa in March 2022. The complaint, filed in July 2021 by Malielegaoi, accused her of defamation.

== Prime minister (2021–2025) ==
The FAST administration moved into the government offices on 26 July 2021. Mataʻafa is Samoa's first female prime minister, and is also the nation's first head of government to not be a member of the HRPP since Tui Ātua Tupua Tamasese Efi left office in 1982. She is also the second woman to lead a Pacific island country after president of the Marshall Islands, Hilda Heine. She also assumed the ministerial portfolios of Foreign Affairs and Natural Resources and Environment. On 20 October 2021, Fiamē relinquished the Natural Resources and Environment and Tourism portfolios to Toeolesulusulu Cedric Schuster. Toelesulusulu was initially appointed Minister of Natural Resources and Environment but resigned in June due to charges of driving while intoxicated. However, he was not convicted and was subsequently reappointed to cabinet. She regained the Tourism portfolio in October 2023, following a cabinet reshuffle.

=== Domestic ===
Mataʻafa and her cabinet immediately began to start implementing a budget that was one month overdue of the fiscal year. The budget of 982 million tālā was passed in the early hours of 23 September 2021 by parliament.

On 6 August 2021, Mataʻafa had reportedly put Attorney General Savalenoa Mareva Betham Annandale on notice. On 21 August, Mata'afa announced that the attorney general along with the clerk of the Legislative Assembly, Tiatia Graeme Tualaulelei would be suspended for two weeks. On 2 September, she announced that Savalenoa would be dismissed effective immediately, citing her failure to defend the judiciary from post election attacks. Fiamē then advised the Head of State to appoint Su'a Hellene Wallwork as Savalenoa's replacement. The Clerk of the Legislative Assembly was suspended for an additional two weeks. Tiatia was sacked on 17 September. Savalenoa responded the following year by filing a lawsuit against Fiamē.

On 3 September 2021, cabinet approved Mataʻafa's request to establish the position of the 'Chief of Staff' within the Ministry of the prime minister. On 20 September, cabinet announced that Samoa would no longer observe daylight savings time.

In early November 2021, the United Nations' office in Samoa recommended legalising abortion and same-sex marriage as part of a Universal periodic review for the UN Human Rights Council. Opposition Leader Malielegaoi protested the suggestion, implying that the FAST government had raised discussions on these policies. Mataʻafa subsequently stated that abortions and same-sex marriage were 'not on the government's agenda' and that it was the UN office, not her party, that had increased attention on these issues. She also warned UN employees to 'not interfere with Samoan politics'. FAST chairman and deputy leader Polataivao shared this sentiment, expressing that these policies go against Samoa's 'culture and Christian beliefs'.

In December 2021, Mataʻafa denounced the swearing-in of former electoral commissioner Faimalōmatumua Mathew Lemisio as deputy president of the Land and Titles Court (LTC) as illegal. She stated that the Land and Titles Act lacked clarity on carrying appointments within the LTC. Fiamē previously expressed concern about this while Deputy Prime Minister. The Minister of Justice Matamua Vasati Pulufana and Attorney-General Su'a Hellene Wallwork shared this sentiment. Advertising of the position of deputy president did not occur, and the Ministry of Justice was not informed about the decision. Despite this, the swearing-in went ahead, and LTC president Fepuleai Attila M. Ropati, who oversaw the ceremony, claimed that new appointments within the court are "made by God".

==== 2025 political crisis and snap election ====
In January 2025 agriculture minister and FAST chairman Laʻauli Leuatea Schmidt was charged with ten criminal offences. After refusing to resign he was sacked as a minister on 10 January. She subsequently dismissed three other ministers for disloyalty. On 15 January Schmidt, acting as FAST chairman, expelled Mataʻafa, Deputy Prime Minister Tuala Iosefo Ponifasio, and four other cabinet ministers from the party. Following her expulsion, Mataʻafa fired 13 associate ministers who had supported Polataivao. Mataʻafa and the other expelled members rejected their expulsion, denounced it as unconstitutional, and claimed they were still members of FAST. Lefau Harry Schuster, one of the dismissed members and an attorney, argued they could only depart from the party if they were to leave voluntarily or if a court upheld their expulsion. Mataʻafa survived a no-confidence motion on 25 February, which was introduced by the HRPP.

On 27 May the government's budget was voted down in parliament, by 34 votes to 16, with Schimdt's faction and the HRPP voting against it. Mataʻafa subsequently advised the O le Ao o le Malo to dissolve parliament on 28 May and order a snap election, with her government becoming a caretaker government. Shortly after, Mataʻafa and her cabinet confirmed their resignations from FAST and formed the Samoa Uniting Party (SUP) to contest the 2025 Samoan general election. The party registered with the electoral commission on 30 May, with Mataʻafa as leader.

During the 2025 election, Mata‘afa won her seat by a wide margin, defeating two FAST candidates. Her party, however, only won three seats, and most of her cabinet ministers, including Deputy Prime Minister Ponifasio, lost re-election. Because the SUP failed to win at least eight seats, the party was unable to sit as a parliamentary bloc. She attributed the SUP's defeat to only having been founded shortly before the election. Mata‘afa also pointed out that many of the party's candidates also had to fulfil their duties as cabinet ministers. She conceded the election on 9 September, and said she had "no regrets" about her premiership. She congratulated FAST and urged them to prioritise the passage of a budget. Schmidt succeeded Mata‘afa as prime minister, shortly after the 18th Parliament was sworn in on 16 September.

=== Foreign policy ===
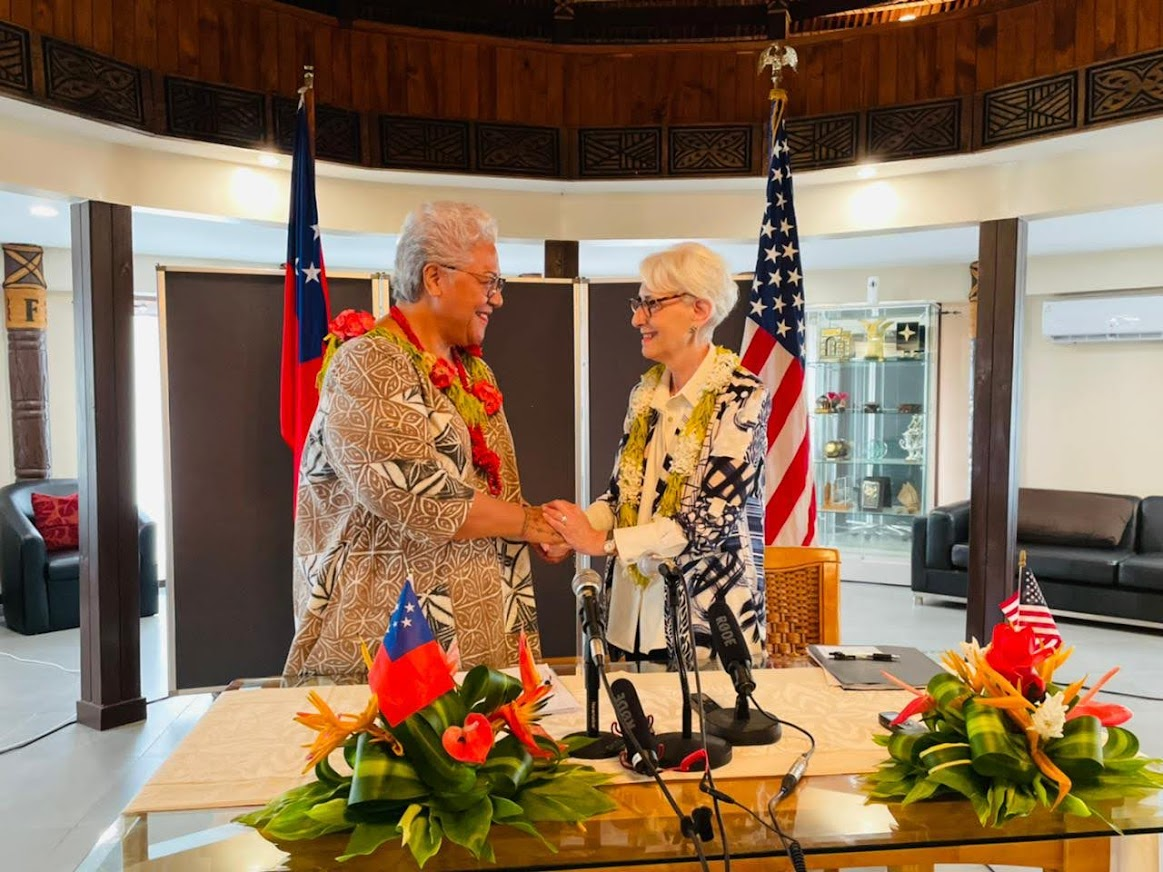
Mataʻafa with US Deputy Secretary of State Wendy Sherman in 2022

==== Australia ====
Mataʻafa put a significant emphasis on climate change with relations between Samoa and Australia. During the tenure of former Australian prime minister Scott Morrison, Mataʻafa warned that Australia's reluctance to increase action on climate change could potentially see a degradation of relations between Apia and Canberra. Following the defeat of the Morrison government in the 2022 Australian election, Mataʻafa welcomed the new government of prime minister Anthony Albanese and its promise to increase Australia's commitment to dealing with climate change. She also praised the smooth transition of administrations, contrasting it to Samoa's turbulent change of government in 2021.

During the visit of Australian foreign minister Penny Wong in June 2022, Mataʻafa signed on to the "Tautua – Human Development for All" partnership. This deal aims to increase Human Development and tackle social inequalities in Samoa. Wong also announced that the Australian government would replace the Guardian-class patrol boat Nafanua II, the condition of which had deteriorated. Mataʻafa stated that the Nafanua II replacement would increase Samoa's maritime security. Following the meetings, Mataʻafa confided to news outlets that "The new Australian Government wants to put more energy and resources in the Pacific", whilst also acknowledging the previous government.

==== China ====
Before formally assuming office, Mataʻafa announced that she would scrap the previous government's plans to construct a new Chinese funded port. She stated that Samoa did not need such a project and that it would risk racking up the country's debt. As of 2021, Samoa's debt to China accounted for 19% of its GDP. She later reaffirmed this decision once she took office. Despite this, Mataʻafa has said that she intends to maintain good relations with China and its geopolitical adversary, the United States. In late May 2022, Chinese foreign minister Wang Yi visited Samoa and signed bilateral agreements with Fiamē. Wang was also visiting neighbouring countries to pitch a multilateral economic and security deal. Mataʻafa did not agree to the proposal describing it as 'abnormal' and said that no implementation of such an agreement should occur until countries of the Pacific Islands Forum met to examine it.

==== New Zealand ====
In mid-June 2022, Mataʻafa visited New Zealand Prime Minister Jacinda Ardern in Wellington. The two leaders reaffirmed friendly bilateral relations between Samoa and New Zealand along with bilateral cooperation in the areas of climate change, COVID-19 and regional cooperation through the Pacific Islands Forum. Fiamē also sought to reassure the New Zealand Government that Samoa was not pursuing military cooperation with China. Earlier, Samoa and China had signed several bilateral agreements on economic and cultural issues. Mataʻafa's trip to New Zealand marked her first official bilateral trip since becoming prime minister in 2021. Mataʻafa also visited Samoan seasonal horticultural workers in the Hawke's Bay region during her New Zealand visit.

In early August, Mataʻafa hosted a New Zealand delegation led by Ardern. On 2 August, Ardern discussed issues of concern to New Zealand–Samoan bilateral relations including climate change, economic resilience, COVID-19, health and Samoan seasonal workers. During the meeting, Ardern confirmed that New Zealand would commit NZ$15 million in aid to support Samoa's climate change mitigation efforts and NZ$12m to rebuild Apia's historical Savalalo Market.

==== Pacific Islands Forum ====
Mataʻafa advocated for unity within the Pacific Islands Forum and highlighted that the collective stance of small island countries such as those in the Pacific was crucial to ensure that these nations are listened to on the world stage. She also views it as a means of defence from the geopolitical aspirations of large countries.

In April 2022, Mataʻafa announced that efforts were "...underway to bring Micronesia back" from leaving the Pacific Islands Forum. In the year prior, when the forum was to elect a new secretary-general, the Micronesian countries of Palau, the Marshall Islands, Kiribati, Nauru and the Federated States of Micronesia announced their withdrawal from the forum. These countries believed that the next secretary-general should have hailed from one of their countries. Still, the Melanesian and Polynesian countries refused to comply and instead supported their respective candidates, which resulted in former Cook Islands prime minister Henry Puna emerging victorious. Mataʻafa described the event as "unfortunate" but also reiterated, "when it became apparent that the North Pacific side of the family felt excluded, I think that was the message which was received by the rest of the leaders." Fiamē's announcement occurred after the Micronesian countries decided to halt their departure. Mataʻafa partook in the final negotiations at the forum headquarters in Suva, Fiji, in which the Micronesian countries agreed to resume their membership after the forum decided to ensure that the next secretary-general would be Micronesian. She described the resolution as a success.

=== COVID-19 pandemic ===
Mataʻafa announced on 9 October 2021 that the government would repatriate Samoan students studying in Fiji, which was experiencing an uptick in COVID-19 cases.

==== Lockdowns ====
On 20 January 2022, ten passengers on a repatriation flight from Australia to Samoa tested positive for COVID-19. Fiamē subsequently announced that Samoa would be going into a 48-hour nationwide lockdown from 22 to 24 January. With the addition of five COVID cases reported, Mataʻafa announced on the evening of 24 January that a 72 hour extension of the lockdown would occur. On 26 January, Mataʻafa's government announced that the lockdown would continue for 24 hours. With no drastic rises in cases, Mataʻafa's government declared on 28 January that the nation would be exiting lockdown. However, for two weeks, no more than 30 individuals would be allowed at gatherings. The opposition HRPP expressed discontent with the government's response, as they believed that the country was not ready to exit lockdown. Due to the full recovery of four COVID patients and no further reports of any additional cases, Mataʻafa declared on 11 February that the remaining restrictions imposed would be lifted, effective by that date. The restrictions lifted included an end to the closure of schools, restaurants and nightclubs. Mataʻafa announced on 18 March that Samoa would be entering another lockdown after the first reported case of community transmission. During the second lockdown, Samoa experienced a dramatic increase in cases. In response, Mataʻafa increased support for vaccination campaigns. She announced that the ease of restrictions would occur, beginning on 5 April. The following month, Mataʻafa allowed Samoan citizens to return and said that Samoa's international borders would fully re-open in August 2022.

== Awards ==
In 2017, Mataʻafa was awarded the Stars of Oceania Individual's Award. In December 2018 she was awarded an honorary Doctor of Letters by the University of the South Pacific. As Minister of Natural Resources and Environment she was awarded the Ocean Stewardship Award in 2017 by Conservation International and the Ocean Health Index for her role in ushering in Samoa's Ocean Strategy.

In December 2021, she was listed on the BBC's 100 Women for 2021.

== Family ==
Mataʻafa is the daughter of Fiame Mataʻafa Faumuina Mulinuʻu II, a paramount chief and the first Prime Minister of Samoa. Her mother, Laulu Fetauimalemau Mataʻafa, was a diplomat, educator and politician. Her maternal grandfather, Le Mamea Matatumua Ata was one of the framers of the Samoan constitution. After her father's death in 1975, she was anointed as his successor to one of his chiefly titles, Fiamē from Lotofaga.

She was studying at university in New Zealand when she was recalled by her ʻaiga (extended family) to take up one of her father's matai titles, Fiamē, from Lotofaga.

Her mother, Laulu Fetaui, had entered parliament in 1975 from the constituency of Lotofaga, following her husband's death. On Laulu Fetaui's retirement from politics Fiamē Naomi contested the seat and was elected.

Mataʻafa is a member of the Congregational Christian Church of Samoa at Lotofaga.

As the holder of the Fiamē title, she is the ranking alii ("Sa'o Faapito") or chief of Lotofaga and head of Sā Levalasi, one of the prominent political clans of Samoa which is also custodian of the Mataʻafa title, one of the four pre-eminent Tama-a-Aiga titles of Samoa.

Mataʻafa is unmarried and does not have any children.

== Notes ==
Legislative Assembly of Samoa
Preceded by Asiasiau Sausoo	Member of Parliament for Lotofaga; 1985–present	Incumbent
Political offices
Preceded by Tuala Ainiu Iusitino	Minister of Women, Community and Social Development; 2006–2011	Succeeded by Tolofuaivalelei Falemoe Leiʻataua
Preceded by Unasa Mesi Galo	Minister of Justice; 2011–2016	Succeeded by Faaolesa Katopau Ainuu
Preceded by Fonotoe Pierre Lauofo	Deputy Prime Minister of Samoa; 2016–2020	Vacant Title next held by Tuala Iosefo Ponifasio
Preceded by Faamoetauloa Ulaitino Faale Tumaalii	Minister of Natural Resources and Environment; 2016–2020	Succeeded by Tuilaʻepa Saʻilele Malielegaoi
Preceded by Sala Fata Pinati	Minister of Tourism; 2021	Succeeded by Toeolesulusulu Cedric Schuster
Preceded by Toeolesulusulu Cedric Schuster	Minister of Natural Resources and Environment; 2021	Succeeded by Toeolesulusulu Cedric Schuster
Preceded by Tuilaʻepa Saʻilele Malielegaoi	Prime Minister of Samoa; 2021–2025	Succeeded by Laʻauli Leuatea Schmidt
Preceded by Tuilaʻepa Saʻilele Malielegaoi	Minister of Foreign Affairs; 2021–2025	Succeeded by Laʻauli Leuatea Schmidt
Preceded by Toeolesulusulu Cedric Schuster	Minister of Tourism; 2023–2025	TBD
Party political offices
Preceded by Fonotoe Pierre Lauofo	Deputy Leader of the Human Rights Protection Party; 2016–2020	Vacant Title next held by Fonotoe Pierre Lauofo
Preceded by Laʻauli Leuatea Schmidt	Leader of Faʻatuatua i le Atua Samoa ua Tasi; 2021–2025	Succeeded by Laʻauli Leuatea Schmidt
New political party	Leader of the Samoa Uniting Party; 2025–present	Incumbent
