= Faʻatuatua i le Atua Samoa ua Tasi =

Samoan political party

Samoa United in Faith Faʻatuatua i le Atua Samoa ua Tasi
- Leader: Laʻauli Leuatea Schmidt
- Deputy Leader: Leota Laki Lamositele
- Founded: 30 July 2020
- Split from: Human Rights Protection Party
- Ideology: Anti–Land and Titles Bill; Christian democracy; Social conservatism; Anti-corruption
- Legislative Assembly: 30 / 51

Website
- www.fastpartysamoa.ws

Faʻatuatua i le Atua Samoa ua Tasi (FAST; English: Samoa United in Faith) is a political party in Samoa. It was founded and is led by MP Laʻauli Leuatea Schmidt. FAST was led by Prime Minister Fiamē Naomi Mataʻafa from 2021 until she was removed as leader in January 2025.

== Formation ==
The party was registered on 30 July 2020, and in August 2020 began announcing candidates for the 2021 Samoan general election. It opposes controversial constitutional amendments proposed by the Human Rights Protection Party government of Tuilaʻepa Saʻilele Malielegaoi, and supports a two-term limit for the prime minister. It also supports decentralising services to villages.

On 28 August 2020, party leader Laʻauli Leuatea Schmidt was reelected to Parliament in the 2020 Gagaifomauga No. 3 by-election, thus becoming the party’s first elected MP.

On 2 September 2020, the party announced it would join forces with the Samoa National Democratic Party and Tumua ma Puleono parties to contest the 2021 election. SNDP and Tumua ma Puleono candidates ran under the FAST banner, with only one candidate in each constituency.

Following the resignation of Deputy Prime Minister Fiamē Naomi Mataʻafa from Cabinet, the FAST party invited her to lead it. She declined, as she wished to complete the Parliamentary term. On 13 January 2021 Mata'afa announced that she would be joining FAST after Parliament has risen for the election. In March 2021 she was elected to lead FAST.

== 2021 election ==
The party nominated 50 candidates for the 2021 election. It engaged in online fund-raising, and by 12 January had raised AUD$19,277 (WST$37,102.18) via Australian crowd-funding site MyCause. In January 2021 it began an "election roadshow", Prime Minister Malielegaoi denounced the roadshow as a "foreign practice", and encouraged his supporters to gatecrash FAST events to counter the party's "brainwashing".

On 13 January 2021, former Prime Minister and O le Ao o le Malo (Head of State) Tui Ātua Tupua Tamasese Efi publicly backed the party.

On 29 January, the party revealed that it had begun talks with the Tautua Samoa Party to form a "grand coalition" to oust the government.

Preliminary results from the 2021 election showed the party winning 25 seats in parliament. Independent MP Tuala Iosefo Ponifasio later joined the FAST Party, bringing their total to 26. Defeated Prime Minister Tuila'epa Sa'ilele Malielegaoi refused to leave office, leading to the 2021 Samoan constitutional crisis. The crisis was resolved by Samoa's Court of Appeal on 23 July 2021, which ruled that FAST had been the government since 24 May.

=== 2021 by-elections ===
The party nominated candidates to contest all seven electorates up for by-elections caused by resignations and convictions on bribery and treating. The FAST caucus retained its narrow 26 seat majority in the Fono during this period, whilst the HRPP’s seat count fell from 25 to 18. Speaker of the Legislative Assembly Papaliʻi Liʻo Taeu Masipau announced that the by-elections would commence on 12 November, but the date was later shifted to 26 November.

FAST began campaigning on 23 October, utilising campaign strategies such as roadshows, as the party had done in the April general election.

==== Results ====
A week before the election, Fuiono Tenina Crichton, FAST's candidate for the Falealupo electorate, challenged the eligibility of his HRPP opponent Tuitogamanaia Peniamina Junior Leavai in court. The court ruled in Fuiono’s favour resulting in the disqualification of Tuitogamanaia's candidacy. Fuiono was subsequently elected unopposed.

The party also secured the Aleipata-i-Lalo electorate, resulting in former Manu Samoa rugby coach Faleomavaega Titimaea Tafua's entry to Parliament. The Sagaga No. 4 seat also went to FAST, with Tagaloatele Pasi Poloa securing a landslide victory over his HRPP opponent. Overall preliminary results indicated that the party had secured four out of the six electorates up for a by-election (excluding Falealupo), with the Safata No. 2 and Falealili No. 2 seats going to FAST. Official results confirmed this, and the new MPs were sworn in on 14 December 2021. The addition of five MPs to the FAST caucus gave the party a more comfortable majority. It also eliminated the opposition HRPP's efforts to gain a majority in the 17th Parliament, using a potential deadlock to call for new polls. One of these seats would again fall vacant the following year with the death of Va'ele Pa'ia'aua Iona Sekuini on 25 March 2022. He was succeeded by Fo'isala Lilo Tu'u Ioane who, was elected as an independent but later joined FAST.

== Fund-raising allegations ==
In 2024, the party conducted a worldwide anniversary fund-raising tour, purportedly to raise money for a new headquarters. In February 2025, party leader Schmidt announced that construction had been postponed. Later that month, party treasurer Leatinuu Wayne So’oialo stated that the tour had been a scam and that the money raised for the headquarters had instead been used to pay off the party's bank overdraft.

== 2025 political crisis ==
On 3 January 2025, Agriculture and Fisheries Minister Schmidt was charged with 10 criminal offences. Prime Minister Mataʻafa dismissed him from cabinet on 10 January after he refused to resign. The Prime Minister sacked another three cabinet ministers, citing disloyalty. On 15 January, the party removed Mataʻafa as FAST leader and expelled her, along with Deputy Prime Minister Tuala Iosefo Ponifasio and three other cabinet ministers from the party. The party unanimously elected Polataivao as leader on 16 January, while Leota Laki Lamositele became deputy leader. Mataʻafa and the other expelled members rejected their expulsion, denounced it as unconstitutional, and claimed they were still members of FAST. Lefau Harry Schuster, one of the dismissed members and an attorney, alleged they could only depart from the party if they were to leave voluntarily or if a court upheld their expulsion. The FAST party subsequently split, with 15 MPs remaining loyal to Mataʻafa and the other 20 joining Schmidt, and Mataʻafa continued as prime minister in a minority government.

== Leadership ==
Portrait	Leader	Term of office		
Portrait	Leader	Took office	Left office	Time in office
	Laʻauli Leuatea Schmidt	30 July 2020	9 March 2021	222 days
	Fiamē Naomi Mataʻafa	9 March 2021	15 January 2025	3 years, 312 days
	Laʻauli Leuatea Schmidt	16 January 2025	Incumbent	1 year, 183 days

== Election results ==
=== Legislative Assembly elections ===
Election	Leader	Votes	%	Seats	+/–	Rank	Status
2021	Fiamē Naomi Mataʻafa	32,510	36.57	25 / 51	New	2nd	Government
2025	Laʻauli Leuatea Schmidt	36,708	40.86	30 / 51	▲5	▲1st	Government
