= Human rights in Samoa =

Samoa, officially the Independent State of Samoa, has a population of approximately 188,000 people. Samoa gained independence from New Zealand in 1962 and has a Westminster model of Parliamentary democracy which incorporates aspects of traditional practices. In 2016, Samoa ratified the Convention on the Rights of Persons with Disabilities CRPD and the three optional protocols to the CRC.

While the Constitution of the Independent State of Samoa provides for the protection of certain fundamental human rights, there continue to be several major issues. Major areas of concern include the under-representation of women, domestic violence and poor prison conditions. Reports issued under the auspices of the United Nations have noted that societal attitudes towards human rights tend to be skeptical, this is attributed to concern that that enforcement of such rights will be at the detriment of Samoan customs and tradition. Another point of concern is gay rights in the country as homosexuality is illegal.

The Human Rights Measurement Initiative measures quality of life, safety from the state and empowerment rights. Samoa scored 89.7% for quality of life, 8.0 out of 10 on safety from the state, and 5.1 out of 10 on empowerment.

== International treaty obligations ==
Samoa is a member of the United Nations and has also ratified the Convention on the Elimination of all Forms of Discrimination Against Women (CEDAW), the Convention on the Rights of the Child (CRC), the International Covenant on Civil and Political Rights (ICCPR), the Rome Statute of the International Criminal Court (ICC) and the eight fundamental conventions of the International Labour Organization (ILO). In 2012 Samoa ratified the International Convention for the Protection of All Persons from Enforced Disappearance (CPPED).

Due to limited resources, Samoa has previously failed to issue reports within the designated time frames of the conventions. For example, Samoa submitted its initial, second and third periodic reports under CEDAW as one document in May 2003 when they were due in 1993, 1997 and 2001 respectively.

Concern has been expressed in regard to Samoa's limited incorporation of treaty obligations into its national law. For example, in 2005 CEDAW voiced concern over the lack of a time frame for reform of domestic legislation in conformity with the convention.

In response to recommendations, Samoa issued a standing invitation to all United Nations Special Procedures Mandate Holders in 2011.

== Constitutional protection ==
The Constitution of the Independent State of Samoa 1960 came into force in 1962 and provides for the protection of fundamental human rights such as:

- Right to life (section 5)
- Right to personal liberty (section 6)
- Freedom from inhuman treatment (section 7)
- Freedom from forced labour (section 8)
- Right to fair trial and due process (sections 9,10)
- Freedom of religion (sections 11,12)
- Rights regarding freedom of speech, assembly, association, movement and residence (section 13)
- Property rights (section 14)
- Freedom from discriminatory legislation (section 15)

While freedom from discrimination is provided for in regards to descent, sex, language, religion, political or other opinion, social origin, place of birth and family status there is no protection from discrimination on the basis of disability or sexual orientation.

A noteworthy omission from the constitution is the right to be free from torture.

== The Office of the Ombudsman ==
Section 11 of the Komesina o Sulufaiga (Ombudsman) Act 1988 establishes the Office of the Ombudsman as an independent body authorised to investigate complaints concerning the actions of governmental authorities within the public sector.

In Samoa's 2011 Universal Periodic Review (UPR), the Samoa Umbrella for Non-Governmental Organisations (SUNGO) was concerned that the office lacked accessibility due to minimal public awareness of the office's functions and its limitation to the public sector.

The last Ombudsman was Luamanuvao Katalaina Sapolu. Following her resignation in May 2023 the office was left vacant.

== National human rights mechanisms ==
While Samoa has no overarching human rights legislation or institution, there has been movement towards the creation of a Human Rights Commission (HRC). In 2009, a joint ‘Samoa Declaration’ was agreed upon amongst several Pacific island states. The declaration emphasised the importance of national human rights institutions and encouraged states to establish such bodies. Samoa has undertaken a Law and Justice Sector Plan 2008-2012 which is intended to include the establishment of a HRC. Samoa reiterated its intention to do so in the UPR in 2011 and received recommendations that it initially be established within the Office of the Ombudsman. In 2013, the Parliament of Samoa passed the Ombudsman (Komesina O Sulufaiga) Act to include human rights as part of the functions of the existing Ombudsman.

== Political participation ==
=== Electoral system ===
Universal suffrage was achieved in 1991 for all Samoan citizens aged 21 years and over.

Samoan tradition is incorporated into the electoral system. Through consensus, a single person is nominated as the chief (Maitai) of each village and only those with a chieftain title may then stand for election of the 47 Samoan seats. Two seats are reserved for non-Samoans.

SUNGO has recommended that the electoral system be altered so as to allow any citizen to stand for election rather than restricting to only those nominated by the village.

== Women's rights in politics ==
The level of female participation in Samoan politics is ranked among the world's lowest. Women's right to vote granted through the inception of universal suffrage in 1991 did little to improve women's participation as the prerequisite to become a candidate in Parliament is being a Matai (chiefs) and most matais are men. Therefore, political participation has been a very slow process because women are constantly confronted with challenges and barriers created by traditions, social perceptions, lack of education, measures, policy interventions and much more. To address gender inequality and encourage women's rights in politics, interventions, advocacy groups, legislation, and treaties have been established. These include the Ministry of Women, Community and Social Development, the Convention on the Elimination of All Forms of Discrimination Against Women (CEDAW), and the Constitution Amendment Act (2013).

=== Right to vote ===
Since Samoa's independence in 1962, only matais (chiefs) were granted voting rights for various elections at both national and local level. Universal suffrage was introduced in 1991 which granted both women and men aged 21 years and over with voting rights. This was first executed in the 1991 elections.

=== Political participation ===
An issue exists regarding the under-representation of women in Parliament. Although there are no legal barriers at the national level, in practice women rarely obtain chief titles. Following the general election of 2006, four women became members of the 49-member Parliament. This represented 8.1% of the available seats. This low representation is thought to be influenced by socio-cultural attitudes. Some villages do not allow women to possess chieftain titles, while others such as Malie, Letogo, Tanugamanono and Saleimoa restrict female chieftain by prohibiting their participation in village councils. This reduces their ability to obtain village consensus for their candidacy.

Despite the inception of universal suffrage, women's representation in the political realm in both local and national levels remain marginalized by chiefs in political decision-making processes. The Electoral Act of 1963 imposes that only a matai is eligible to run or serve as a Member of Parliament. In which case a large majority of matais are men. This limited number of women matais hinders the opportunity for women to participate in politics. However, despite male domination of chief titles, women matai numbers in 1993 were reported as 1,261 which was considered to be an improvement from earlier years.

==== Local level ====
Male matais dominate most of the decision-making in village councils. A limited number of female matais are a part of the village councils, and women are gradually entering the village councils. There are 240 villages in Samoa with an average of 56 matais per village. Pulenu'u (village mayors) are elected by the village councils and are remunerated by the government. In 2011, five pulenu'u were women, which equated to 3 percent of the total pulenu'u population.

As for women in village councils, one woman out of 229 village council members was recorded in 1994. In 2011, an overall 10.5 percent of chiefs were women, and in the village councils, women made up 36 percent. Findings from research on women's participation in politics found that a low participation of women at the local level translates into the low population in national government.

==== National level ====
Early evidence of women's representation in Parliament dates back to 1970 (see table below). Honorable Taulapapa Faimaala was the first woman Member of Parliament (MP) in Samoa and served two terms. She was a pioneer for Samoan women as she was also the first Deputy Speaker of the House from 1973 to 1976. Ten years later, her daughter Honorable Fiame Naomi Mata'afa was elected as an MP and is the longest standing woman in Parliament serving 30 years. In 1998, Fiame became the first female Cabinet Minister who has served as the Minister for Education, Women, Community and Social Development. At present, Fiame is the Minister of Justice and Courts Administration.

Over the years, there has been a notable increase in the number of female candidates. There were 22 candidates in 1996, where 3 women were selected as cabinet members. Most recently in March 2016 elections, a record-breaking total of 24 candidates came forward, of whom 4 were elected. In adherence to the 10 per cent quota codified in the Constitutional Amendment Act 2013, an additional woman will be added to Parliament due to the results of the elections.

The following table indicates that, despite the relatively low number of female matais, some women have been successful in national politics.

Table 1: Women Political Development in Samoa 1961-2011
Parliaments	No. of Candidates	No. of successful candidates	Success rate (%)	Members of Parliament (%)	Deputy Speaker	Cabinet Minister
1961-63	0	0	0	0	0	0
1964-66	1	0	0	0	0	0
1967-69	0	0	0	0	0	0
1970-72	3	1	33.00	2.1	1	0
1973-75	2	2	100.00	4.2	0	0
1976-78	5	2	40.00	4.2	0	0
1979-81	5	1	20.00	2.1	0	0
1982-84	5	1	20.00	2.1	0	0
1985-87	4	2	50.00	4.2	0	0
1988-90	5	1	20.00	2.1	0	1
1991-95	4	2	50.00	4.1	0	1
1996-00	9	5	56.00	10.2	0	1
2001-05	10	3	30.00	6.1	0	2
2006-10	22	5	23.00	10.2	0	3
2011-15	10	2	20.00	4.1	0	1
Numbers include women who contested by-elections. Note: 2016 elections: a record of 24 candidates, 4 successful + 1 (using the quota), equating to 10 percent of women's representation in Parliament Source: Table cited from Samoa's Journey 1962-2012

==== Limitations ====
Many academics have attempted to investigate the challenges women face entering politics at all levels. These include cultural and circumstantial barriers and lack of policy interventions which have been reported to bring hindrance to women obtaining support from the villages, traditional leadership knowledge, mentor assistance and political networking.

- Cultural barriers about a woman's place in political spheres at both the community and Parliament levels are one of the major factors influencing women's participation in public life. Their primary traditional role was restricted to enhance and uphold family status. The historic methods of upholding their customary role was through producing the ie toga (fine mats) which were the most valuable currency in Samoan social, economic and political sphere. More so, women are referred to as "o le pae ma le auli" or the shell and the iron referring to their role as peacemakers who resolve conflicts within their family which is still evident today. The traditional female roles and responsibilities to spouses and children were stated as barriers for many women to participate in politics.
- Social perceptions of villages in Samoa view women as supporters, organizers, and campaign managers for their spouse or male relatives who are decision makers or political candidates.
- A need for education and training measures to challenge social attitudes about women and decision-making are necessary remedies to assist women's perspectives. There is a lack of educational opportunities to help promote young women attitudes and self-belief as potential leaders or to introduce them to the concept of national politics. Women who are not exposed to the matai language and protocols during their upbringing will play a vital role into future roles in politics. In turn, does not provide women with the right resources and preparations to be involved in decision-making in matai council meetings. Such knowledge and meaningful contribution to village rules and governance requires mentorship and education from active women politicians.
- A lack of policy to initiate positive change to the low numbers of female participation was stated by UNICEF as a fundamental contributing factor.

=== Promoting women's representation ===
Ratification of certain treaties and legislation, and the establishment of a Ministry for Women, are among the many efforts that Samoa has taken to promote women's roles and rights in politics.

==== Ministry of Women, Community and Social Development ====
The Samoan government established the Ministry of Women's Affairs now referred to as the Ministry of Women, Community and Social Development (MWCSD). Its purpose according to the Ministry of Women's Affairs Amendment Act 1998 was to empower women to fulfill their role in society and in the workplace. A division of women has been established under the governance of MWCSD, to act as the "focal point" for the CEDAW that works in partnership with NGOs and other government departments.

==== Convention on the Elimination of all forms of Discrimination Against Women (CEDAW) ====
In September 1991, Samoa ratified the Convention on the Elimination of all forms of Discrimination Against Women (CEDAW) to provide a human rights framework based on gender equality. Samoa was the first Pacific Island Country to become a party to CEDAW. In execution of Samoa's commitment to CEDAW, it must submit a report on the legislative, judicial, administration or other measures which it has adapted to give effect to CEDAW. According to UNICEF, members and leaders of judicial, legal, management and community in Samoa society must understand CEDAW to better implement and adhere to this convention.

Relevant to women participation in politics, Article 7 of CEDAW imposes governments to grant women with the right to vote, participate in forming and implementing government policies and to join public and political organisations.

==== Constitution Amendment Act (2013) ====
In June 2013, in response to recommendations for policy interventions to address gender imbalance, the Samoan government ratified the Constitution Amendment Act (2013) (CAA). It established a 10 per cent quota system to reserve seats to women electoral candidates into the national legislative assembly. It guarantees women representation if there is less than five seats elected, up to five seats will be reserved for women and if there are only two, then the three women with the next highest number of votes will be granted seats. In adaptation of such constitutional mandate for female Parliamentarian seats, Samoa has become the first independent country in the Pacific to do so. The Prime Minister Honorable Tuilaepa Aiono Sailele Malielegaoi announced the Parliament's intention when seeking to implement the legislation:

"If we do not put in the necessary stipulation in our legislation one never knows whether in the next elections there [will] be absolutely no women in Parliament. So this is part of our intention to ensure that there shall always be women in Parliament."

The reception of the amendment has been both negative and positive. On the one hand, the amendment demonstrates a positive change for Samoa as it will improve women participation in Parliament. The Speaker of the Legislative Assembly referred to it as 'a new dawn for women'. However at the preliminary discussions before passing of the Bill, the opposition party Tautua Samoa contended that there was a need to gather a consensus and views from the villages because some villages have banned women from holding matai titles. The quota was described as being 'minimal' and 'not enough' to make a real difference. In response to the amendment, an interview with an MP before March 2016 elections stated that Samoan government are not actively executing their duty to address women's representation in politics despite their wish to do so. Another view argued that although the amendment is a good start to counter political involvement, intervention is more needed to address cultural and tangible barriers to women as political leaders.

In adherence to the new law, the results of the March 2016 elections activated the 10 percent quota system. Four candidates were elected, and as such, a fifth female candidate will be added to Parliament using the highest votes percentage ratio as required by the amendment.

== Women's Rights ==
=== Domestic violence ===
Domestic violence against women remains a prominent issue in Samoa as recognised by its government and CEDAW. The Crimes Act 2013 criminalizes rape, including marital rape. Maluseu Doris Tulifau established the non-profit organisation Brown Girl Woke to educate and counter against gender-based violence in Samoa.

Accurate statistics are difficult to obtain as often cases are not reported or recorded due to societal attitudes that discourage this. Altering such perspectives is identified as important in combating this problem. However, there has been a rise in the number of cases reported in recent years. This increase has been attributed to governmental departments and non-governmental organisations (NGO's) in implementing programmes that have created greater awareness of the issue and encouraged reporting.

Samoa has established measures to aid in combating this problem such as:

- A National Plan of Action for the Advancement of Women (2008–2012) which outlines a strategic approach for the advancement of women's rights.
- The Ministry of Women, Community and Social Development (MWCSD) whose mandate focuses on the social and economic development of the community with an emphasis on the role of women. The ministry also undertakes awareness programmes on issues of domestic abuse.
- The finalisation of the Family Safety Bill 2009 is intended to give greater effect to CEDAW and CRC in relation to domestic violence issues. The enactment of the bill has been criticised as taking too long.
- The Domestic Violence Unit operates within the Ministry of Police and Prisons and handles issues of violence against women and children.

=== Employment rights ===
While women enjoy many of the same rights as men in terms of employment opportunities, there remain areas of discrimination. In 2007 it was reported that under national legislation women were restricted from undertaking night time work or manual labour that is deemed ‘unsuited to their physical capacity.’ This has been seen as inconsistent with article 11 of CEDAW which prohibits discrimination in employment.

=== Abortion ===
Abortion is legal in Samoa only if the mother's life or physical or mental health is at risk.

== Prison conditions ==
The prison conditions in Samoa, most notably the main prison at Tafaigata, are of low quality and the Samoan government has recognised the need to remedy the situation. Prison facilities lack sufficient resources in regards to funding and the availability of trained personnel. SUNGO reported that a number of prisons failed to adequately provide a sufficient quantity of basic necessities such as water, food and basic sanitation. It has been noted that prison cells are holding large groups of prisoners beyond their capabilities.

While the Office of the Ombudsman is authorised to receive complaints from prisoners, this avenue has not yet been utilised. Under the Law and Justice Sector Plan, the government is reviewing the Prison Act 1967 and drafting legislation to move responsibility for the review of prisons away from the Ministry of Police and establish it within an independent authority.

== Freedom of Religion ==
Article 11 of the Constitution of Samoa guarantees Freedom of Religion. The preamble to the 1960 Constitution enunciates Samoa as “an independent State based on Christian principles and Samoan custom and traditions”. The major issues concerning freedom of religion throughout the years gave rise to international criticism and international media coverage as well as legal battles. These issues stem from inconsistencies in theory, including a clear definition of religious freedom, the interpretation of Article 11, and practices at the local level in villages.

=== Background and social structure ===
Prior to its independence in 1962, Samoa underwent a lot of struggle through civil wars, and the arrival of colonial powers in the 18th century further exacerbated the problem of tribal rivalry. Rivalry between colonists forced the indigenous groups to take sides, creating deeper conflict between indigenous peoples. Colonisation came in the form of Christian missionaries and traders in the 1830s, resulting in the near total conversion of Samoans to Christianity.

This created significant change in Samoa, not only in its traditional beliefs but also in its worldview. Colonisation, Eurocentrism, and Christianity influenced Samoa tremendously through westernization of systems and the erosion of traditional beliefs, which were replaced by Christian concepts, as well as corruption of thought. The quick succession and acceptance of Christianity were seen as concomitant with fulfilling the prophecy of the legendary warrior goddess Nafanua: "…foretelling that chief Malietoa would gain power from Heaven".

Religion quickly became the core of Samoan life and the cornerstone of the villages. Samoa's three main Christian denominations are the Congregational Christian (CCC), Methodist, and Catholic Churches, the first three to arrive. The villages are loyal to these three denominations, giving rise to their dominance. Church ministers hold the highest prestige and, in most villages, acquire the elite equivalent to the highest chief, with the villagers' conviction that true blessings from God are through subservience to one's church. Almost all Samoans identify as Christians.

Samoa is made up of villages, and each village has its own bylaws, including which religion the village allows its inhabitants to practice. This has been the traditional political system in Samoan culture. The village system comprises the 'fono a matai' or 'fono a ali’i ma faipule'; the matai council is, therefore, 'the council of titled men'. The 'fono a matai' underpins Samoan culture, and the council is seen as the law in the villages. The Fono is governed under the Village Fono Act 1990.

=== Freedom of Religion Versus Village Fono ===
The Constitution of Samoa Article 11 guarantees freedom of religion. However, it has been under scrutiny, with many heated debates for years in its application versus the village fono bylaws. Despite the country's constitutional guarantee of religious freedom, violations at the local level are common, often going unreported due to fear of repercussions or the value of va-fealoa’i, which emphasizes respect and conformity.

Most villages have agreed that only mainline denominations (CCC, Methodist, Catholic) should be permitted for villagers. In Gataivai, Savai'i, only the Methodist denomination is permitted, while in Satupa'itea, only Catholicism is allowed. In Salamumu, a new denomination faced severe backlash when its adherents were banned from holding Bible studies; four members were hog-tied and abandoned until rescued, while their homes were burned, possessions destroyed, and members, including a pregnant woman, were beaten. In the case of Sovita v. Police, the defendants were chiefs and untitled men (taulele'a) of Salamumu village; who argued that they were acting on order and command from the decision made by the fono.

The case of Mau Sefo & others v. Attorney General, the village of Saipipi banished the plaintiffs from the village for holding bible studies and worship services other than the three denominations sanctioned. In the case of Tariu Tuivaiti v. Sila Faamalaga & Others, the plaintiffs were banished from the village of Matautu Falelatai for failing to attend church". While the courts typically rule in favor of the religious freedom guaranteed by the constitution, cases are rarely brought.

There are a number of reasons why people refrain from seeking legal remedies or advice. It is clear that at the village fono and on the local level, Article 11 of the constitution is disregarded, if not disdained, by Samoans. The village fono, which have a legitimized authority under the Village Fono Act of 1990 have repeatedly violated Article 11, and court rulings appear to be disregarded in decisions made by fono.

In 1998, the incident in Salamumu resulted in international condemnation and backlash from citizens, prompting the Cabinet to establish a Commission of Inquiry in 2010 "to inquire into and report in detail on the working of Article 11 of the Constitution in relation to churches and other religious organizations in Samoa and to examine and report whether there is any necessity or expediency for further specific legislation related to this right." The Samoan Government is quoted as saying that freedom of religion "posed a direct challenge to the autonomy of the village council."

=== Samoa’s constitutional amendment and its international obligations ===
In December of 2016, Parliament passed a bill to amend the Constitution of Samoa to include a new statement in Section 1: "Samoa is a Christian nation founded on God the Father, the Son and the Holy Spirit.". The preamble is even more explicitly Christian: "WHEREAS sovereignty over the Universe belongs to the Omnipresent God alone...", and "WHEREAS the Leaders of Samoa have declared that Samoa should be an Independent State based on Christian principles and Samoan custom and tradition."

In practice, the Government affirms the unabridged right to religious freedom. Religious groups are not required to register, and while schools often pray, religious instruction is not included in public school syllabi. However, civil society tends to be hostile towards non-Christian beliefs. There is a strong societal pressure on citizens to adhere to Christianity, particularly the specific church of their home village. In some villages, villagers who did not adhere to that village's denomination were harassed, fined, or ostracized.

The Samoan National Council of Churches is an influential political organization, that has explicitly opposed freedom of religion, calling for a blanket prohibition on practicing Islam, and rejecting non-Christian faith of any kind.

Internationally, Samoa is bound by its accession to the ICCPR. Notionally, this means that Samoa would be in violation of an international treaty should it abolish Article 11 of its constitution or otherwise eliminate freedom of religion through official acts. Though Samoa would be condemned by the United Nations and the wider international community should it violate the ICCPR, more pressing is the potential damage it could to do Samoa's relationship with New Zealand. The passage of the Land and Titles Bill in 2020 has already drawn condemnation from the New Zealand Law Society due to its express purpose of removing accountability of village fono to the Supreme Court of Samoa.

== Disabled persons ==
Based on statistics from 2006, there are approximately 2100 persons living with disabilities in Samoa. There is no specific legislation protecting the rights of persons with disabilities and nor is it a basis for freedom from discrimination in Samoa's constitution. Samoa is not a party to the Convention on the Rights of Persons with Disabilities (CRPD) yet has indicated that they would consider acceding to it.

Samoa has set up a National Disabilities Taskforce which constructs programmes that provide assistance to persons with disabilities. This is guided by the National Policy and National Plan of Action for Persons with Disabilities set up in 2009.

== Rights of the child ==
The issue of child street vendors in Samoa has been acknowledged with growing concern. SUNGO submits that by allowing this issue to continue, Samoa is acting contrary its obligations under both the CRC in regards to the right to education and the convention of the ILO in regards to freedom from exploitative labour.

Reports suggest that issues of poverty and hardship contribute to the existence of child street vendors. Samoa has a National Policy for Children 2010-2015 which is aimed at alleviating poverty and providing protection to children through programmes and services.

== See also ==
- Censorship in Samoa
- LGBT rights in Samoa
- Universal Declaration of Human Rights, Article 2
- Village Fono Act 1990
- United Nations General Assembly, 2016, Elimination of all forms of religious intolerance
- United Nations General Assembly, 1999, Elimination of all forms of religious intolerance
- International Convention on Civil and Political Rights Article 2(1), Article 3, Article 18(2), Article 18(3)
- Carolyn Evans, Religion as Politics not Law: the Religion Clauses in the Australian Constitution
