= Land and Titles Bill =

2020 Samoan legislation

Land and Titles Act

Parliament of Samoa
- Long title: An act to replace the Land and Titles Act 1981
- Citation: No. 24/2020
- Passed by: Government of Samoa
- Passed: 15 December 2020

Repeals
- Land and Titles Act 1981

Related legislation
- Land and Titles Act 2020
- Status: Current legislation

The Land and Titles Bill is one of three bills passed by the Legislative Assembly of Samoa to reform the legal framework around the Land and Titles Court of Samoa and Samoan customary law. The bills are viewed by some as undermining human rights and the rule of law, and are the subject of significant controversy in Samoa.

The bills were passed on 15 December 2020.

== Background ==
Samoan law stems from two sources: English common law, as ultimately embodied in the Constitution of Samoa, and Samoan customary law, such as Faʻamatai. In 1992 the Supreme Court of Samoa found that "Samoa has two systems of law working side by side. On the one hand, we have statute law, English common law and equity, on the other, custom and usage and the principles of customary law which governs the holding of matai titles and customary land—each legal system has its own court." Customary law is also primary for issues of village governance under the Village Fono Act 1990.

80% of land in Samoa is held as customary land, with title formally vested in matai. Disputes over this land—for example, over boundaries or ownership—are decided by the Land and Titles Court according to Samoan custom. While appeals are nominally forbidden, the Supreme Court of Samoa exercises a supervisory jurisdiction for breaches of fundamental rights. Decisions of the Land Court — and ultimately, local matai—over titles have been overturned by the Supreme Court for breach of the right to a fair trial. The Land and Titles Court has been the subject of criticism for a number of years due to ongoing delays, verbal-only rulings, poor process, and outright bias. In 2016, the Samoan Parliament commissioned a Special Inquiry Committee to review the Court and improve its processes. The Committee recommended a number of improvements, including written rulings and conflict of interest provisions. One of the recommendations was that the supervisory jurisdiction of the Supreme Court be retained to ensure the fundamental rights of Samoan citizens are upheld.

Village governance is conducted according to custom by meetings (fono) of matai conducted under the Village Fono Act. In addition to local government functions such as sanitation and economic development, and punishment of low-level village misconduct, fono are empowered to make decision on issues such as harmony, promoting social cohesion, protecting Samoan customs and traditions, and safeguarding village traditions, norms and protocols, and are empowered to issue punishments such as fines, work, or banishment. These powers are sometimes abused, for example to fine or banish political candidates or their supporters, or followers of minority religious groups. These decisions have also been overturned by the Supreme Court on human rights grounds, and the Court has consistently upheld the constitutional right to freedom of religion over village decisions.

== Provisions ==
The Bill would repeal the existing Land and Titles Act 1981 and replace it with a new regime. The Land and Titles Court would be retained, but appeals to the Supreme Court of Samoa and Court of Appeal of Samoa would be forbidden, instead being handled by a new "Land and Titles High Court" and "Land and Titles Court of Appeal and Review". Appeals heard by the Land and Titles Court under the Village Fono Act 1990 would also be redirected.

The Constitution Amendment Bill 2020 and Judicature Bill 2020 make subsidiary changes to the Constitution of Samoa and Samoan court system to enable the changes to the Land and Title Court system to occur. The constitutional amendments remove the jurisdiction of Samoa's civil and criminal courts over issues within the jurisdiction of the Land and Titles Court, and establish the new Land and Titles Court appellate divisions. As at present, decisions of the Land and Titles Court would be made according to customary law, and a clause specifically states that "The English common law and equity of England does not apply in the Land and Titles Court". According to its Explanatory Memorandum, one of the purposes of the Bill is to prevent the decisions of Village Fonos from being overridden by the courts for infringing on human rights.

A version of the bill was first introduced to the Samoan Parliament in January 2019. An updated version of the bill was reintroduced on 17 March 2020. After being passed through Parliament to its third reading under the state of emergency declared due to the global COVID-19 pandemic, progress on the Bill was halted to allow consideration by a special select committee and consultation with local villages. In August 2020 the committee's consideration on the Bill was extended.

== Controversy ==
The Bill and its related legislation has resulted in significant controversy, and been condemned both within Samoa and internationally.

In April 2020 the Samoa Law Society expressed concern about the bill being passed under urgency through Parliament, without any of the required public consultation. Samoa's judiciary also expressed "grave concerns" with the proposed constitutional amendments, via a letter from the Acting Chief Justice Vui Clarence Nelson and co-signed by all judges of the Supreme and District Courts.

In May 2020 Samoa's Ombudsman Maiava Iulai Toma formally expressed opposition to the Bills in a submission to Parliament, saying that it threatened freedom of religion. The United Nations special rapporteur on the Independence of Judges and Lawyers in an open letter to the Samoan government said that new provisions relating to the dismissal of judges would breach international standards on judicial independence and would violate article 14 of the International Covenant on Civil and Political Rights. It has also been condemned by Amnesty International and the New Zealand Law Society.

Opposition to the Bill has led to the resignation of three MPs from the Human Rights Protection Party: Laauli Leuatea Polataivao in May, Faumuina Asi Pauli Wayne Fong in July, and Deputy Prime Minister Fiamē Naomi Mataʻafa in September. Mata'afa later denounced the Bill as undermining the rule of law.

Supporters of the bills view them as embedding Samoan values in the constitution, and explicitly disagreed with the constitution's protection of human rights. The Government of Samoa argues that the reforms do not change the status quo, and that they do not deal with the alienation of lands to third parties, but rather domestic civil disputes between families about their own customary land. They also argue that the reforms enhance the coexistence of the laws by creating new appeal rights, and that the judicial review powers of the Supreme Court in the previous regime were strictly for procedural review only, and did not allow for any substantial review by a papalagi Court of Samoan cultural practices and norms. Former Chief Justice Patu Tiava'asu'e Falefatu Sapolu has argued in support of the Bills, saying that the customary rights of Samoa cannot encroach on individual rights because the country's way of life is already entrenched in their co-existence both in practice and in law. Former Prime Minister Tuilaepa Sailele Malielegaoi has argued that the Westminster system of law does not and cannot dictate to Samoa what its micro or macro applied customary practices should be, and criticised opponents of the bills as "not Samoan".

The bills were passed on 15 December 2020, with 41 votes in favour and 4 against.

== Legal discrepancies ==
In November 2021 problems emerged with the bills when the Land and Titles Court attempted to appoint former Electoral Commissioner Faimalomatumua Mathew Lemisio as Deputy President of the Court. The appointments process was suspended by Minister of Justice Matamua Vasati Pulufana on the grounds that a "drafting error" in the Land and Titles Bill meant that there were no legal provisions for appointments to the court. Attorney-General Su'a Hellene Wallwork subsequently issued a formal opinion that the lack of appointment provisions meant that no appointments could be made until further legislation had been passed, and that the Komisi o Fa'amasinoga o Fanua ma Suafa, intended to be an appointments and supervisory body for the court, was legally powerless. An investigation by the Attorney-General revealed that the legislation passed by parliament differed from that signed into law by the head of state, and the government ordered an investigation. In January 2022 Speaker of the House Papali’i Li’o Taeu Masipau said that an investigation by the Clerk had concluded that the error was the result of a "mix up" of copies, and that in addition to the identified differences between the version passed and the version signed into law, the versions sold to the public, on parliament's website, and used by the Attorney-General all differed from each other. On 1 February 2022 parliament established a commission of inquiry to investigate the discrepancies and how to resolve them.

On 14 April 2022 the Supreme Court found that the Land and Titles Act 2020 meant that judges appointed under the Land and Titles Act 1981 continued to have jurisdiction only as expressly saved under the new Act, and had no jurisdiction under the new Act. It recommended that Parliament consider how to remedy the problem.

On 19 May 2022 a parliamentary inquiry found that the discrepancies were due to unauthorised changes made by former Clerk of the Legislative Assembly Tiatia Graeme Tualaulelei at the behest of the President of the Land and Titles Court and former Attorney General Savalenoa Mareva Betham Annandale, and recommended that criminal charges be laid against them.

== Repeal ==
In August 2024 a pair of bills to reverse the changes made by the bill, disestablish the Land and Titles Court of Appeal and Review, and restore the oversight of the Supreme Court was introduced to the legislative assembly.

== See also ==
- Human rights in Samoa
- Village Fono Act 1990
