= Leiataualesa =

Leiataualesa is both a given name and a surname. Notable people with the name include:

- Leiataualesa Vaiao Alailima (1921– 2016), Samoan politician
- Leiataualesa Daryl Clarke, l Samoan judge
- Lafaitele Patrick Leiataualesa (born 1968), Samoan politician
