= Clarence Nelson (judge) =

Samoan judge (born 1955)

Vui Clarence Nelson

5th Ombudsman of Samoa
- Incumbent
- Assumed office 28 July 2026
- Nominated by: Laʻauli Leuatea Schmidt
- Appointed by: Tuimalealiʻifano Vaʻaletoʻa Sualauvi II
- Preceded by: Luamanuvao Katalaina Sapolu

Personal details
- Born: 22 December 1955 (age 70) Apia, Samoa
- Education: University of Canterbury

Vui Clarence Joseph Nelson (born 22 December 1955) is a former Samoan judge who was the first Pacific Islands judge appointed to the United Nations Committee on the Rights of the Child. In 2026 he was appointed as Samoa's Ombudsman.

== Early life ==
Nelson was born in Apia, Samoa, and educated at St. Joseph's College in Samoa and Timaru Boys' High School in New Zealand. He studied law at the University of Canterbury in Christchurch, New Zealand, graduating in 1977. He returned to Samoa in 1979, where he worked for the Office of the Attorney General and then in private practice.

== Judicial Career ==
In 2000 he was appointed to the District Court of Samoa, becoming Senior District Court Judge in 2001. In 2006 he was appointed to the Supreme Court of Samoa. As a supreme court judge he decided the case of Police v Vailopa [2009], which set requirements for police interviews of child suspects. He also advocated for the creation of a sex offender's registry in Samoa, resulting eventually in the passage of the Sex Offenders Registration Act in 2018.

In 2014 Vui became the first Pacific Islands judge appointed to the United Nations Committee on the Rights of the Child. He was appointed for a second four-year term in 2018. In this role he criticised the Samoan government's attempted re-introduction of corporal punishment in schools.

In 2019 following the retirement of Patu Tiava'asu'e Falefatu Sapolu he was appointed acting Chief Justice of Samoa. He served in that role for almost a year before the appointment of Satiu Simativa Perese as Chief Justice in March 2020. On 30 November 2021 he was appointed as Senior Judge of the Supreme Court.

In June 2026 he retired from the bench. He was immediately appointed as Samoa's Ombudsman, filling an office that had been left vacant since the resignation of Luamanuvao Katalaina Sapolu in 2023. He was sworn in in July 2026.

== Honours and awards ==
In April 2023 he was awarded an honorary Doctor of Laws by the University of Canterbury.

In August 2026 he was one of ten legal professionals awarded a lifetime achievement award by the Samoa Law Society.
