= Clarence Nelson =

Clarence Nelson may refer to:

- Bill Nelson (Clarence William Nelson II, born 1942), American politician
- Clarence Nelson (judge) (born 1955), Samoan judge
