= Tuatagaloa =

Tuatagaloa is both a given name and a surname. Notable people with the name include:

- Tuatagaloa Leutele Te'o (1908–1980), Western Samoan high chief
- Belgium Tuatagaloa (born 1989), New Zealand rugby union player
- Mata Tuatagaloa, Samoan judge
- Natu Tuatagaloa (born 1966), American football player
- Taimalelagi Fagamalama Tuatagaloa-Leota, Samoan Anglican archdeacon
