= Fepuleai =

Fepuleai is a Samoan-language masculine given name and Samoan-language surname. Notable people with the name include:

== Given name ==
- Fepuleai Ameperosa Roma (born ~1977), Samoan judge
- Fepuleai Semi, Samoan politician
- Fepuleai Fa'asavalu Faimata Su'a (born ~1974), Samoan politician

== Surname ==
- Daniel Fepuleai (born 1988), Cook Islands rugby league footballer
- Toa Fepuleai, New Zealand rugby league footballer
- Tofiga Fepulea'i (born 1974), New Zealand actor and comedian
- Vincent Fepulea'i, Samoan rugby union footballer
