= Waitangi Tribunal =

Permanent commission of inquiry in New Zealand

- Te Rōpū Whakamana i te Tiriti

Agency overview
- Formed: 1975
- Headquarters: Wellington, New Zealand
- Employees: 60 (excluding members)
- Parent department: Special Jurisdictions
- Parent agency: Ministry of Justice
- Key document: Treaty of Waitangi
- Website: Tribunal website

The Waitangi Tribunal (Māori: Te Rōpū Whakamana i te Tiriti o Waitangi) is a New Zealand permanent commission of inquiry established under the Treaty of Waitangi Act 1975. It is charged with investigating and making recommendations on claims brought by Māori relating to actions or omissions of the Crown, in the period largely since 1840, that breach the promises made in the Treaty of Waitangi. The Tribunal is not a court of law; therefore, the Tribunal's recommendations and findings are not binding on the Crown. They are sometimes not acted on, for instance in the foreshore and seabed dispute.

The inquiry process contributes to the resolution of Treaty claims and to the reconciliation of outstanding issues between Māori and Pākehā. In 2014, the Tribunal found that Ngāpuhi rangatira did not give up their sovereignty when they signed the Treaty of Waitangi in 1840.

== History ==
In 1975, protests from Māori about unresolved Treaty of Waitangi grievances had been increasing for some time, and the Tribunal was set up to provide a legal process for the investigation of those grievances. Matiu Rata, a Minister of Māori Affairs in the early 1970s, took a leading role in the Tribunal's creation.

Originally the Tribunal could investigate grievances only since 1975, but in 1985, a law change meant the Tribunal's jurisdiction was extended back to 1840, the date of the Waitangi Treaty. The subsequent findings of many Treaty breaches by the Crown in various inquiries led to a public backlash against the Tribunal. The Tribunal has often been a political issue in the 1990s and 2000s.

Originally a Tribunal investigation and report was a prerequisite for a Treaty settlement, but in 1999, to speed up settlements, parliament changed the process so that claimants could go straight to settlement with the Office of Treaty Settlements without engaging in the Tribunal process. This was an increasingly popular shortcut to settlement in the face of the slow Tribunal process. The deadline for submitting historical claims was 1 September 2008, but contemporary claims can still be filed.

In late October 2024, the Government appointed retired cabinet minister Richard Prebble and senior insurer Ken Williamson to the Tribunal. Kevin Prime was reappointed for a second term. Labour Member of Parliament Willie Jackson objected to Prebble's appointment, citing his alignment with the ACT Party's policies towards Māori including the controversial Treaty Principles Bill.

On 17 January 2025, Minister for Māori Development Tama Potaka announced an overhaul of the Waitangi Tribunal's membership. He appointed eight new members including Rangitāne Tū Mai Rā Trust general manager Tipene Crisp, lawyer and New Zealand On Air board member Philip Crump, Ngāti Raukawa Treaty negotiator Vanessa Eparaima, veteran public servant Rex Edward Hale, Manawatū District Councillor Grant Hadfield, Tupuora Education founder and managing director Kingi Kiriona, former Defence Minister and Mayor of Carterton Ron Mark, and University of Waikato law Professor Tafaoimalo Leilani Tuala-Warren. In addition, Potaka renewed the warrants of six existing Tribunal members including Ruakere Hond, Derek Fox, Kim Ngārimu, Hana O'Regan, Pou Temara and Kevin Prime. Ten members including Linda Tuhiwai Smith, Tom Roa, Rawinia Higgins, Herewini Te Koha, Prue Kapua, Monty Soutar, Ron Crosby, Robyn Anderson, Tania Simpson and Grant Phillipson did not have their terms renewed. Te Pāti Māori co-leader Debbie Ngarewa-Packer described the removal of several well known Māori academics as a "whitewash." In response, Potaka said that Ngarewa-Packer's comments were "unhelpful" and undermined the knowledge and experience of the new appointees.

On 9 May, Potaka announced that an "independent technical advisory group" would review the Treaty of Waitangi Act 1975, which governs the scope of the Waitangi Tribunal. This review was part of the Sixth National Government's coalition agreements with the ACT and New Zealand First parties to review the scope of the Waitangi Tribunal.

In early October 2025, Potaka appointed ASB Bank and Whai Rawa Fund director Juliet Tainui-Hernandez as a member of the Waitangi Tribunal.

== Organisational structure and powers ==
=== Investigatory powers ===
The Waitangi Tribunal is not a court. Since it was established as a permanent commission of inquiry, its method of investigation differs significantly from that of a court in several important respects:

- Generally, the Tribunal has authority only to make recommendations. In certain limited situations, the Tribunal does have binding powers, but in most instances, its recommendations do not bind the Crown, the claimants, or any others participating in its inquiries. In contrast, courts can make rulings that bind the parties to whom they relate.
- The Tribunal's process is more inquisitorial and less adversarial than that followed in the courts. In particular, it can conduct its own research to try and find the truth of a matter, whereas courts generally must decide a matter solely on the evidence and legal arguments presented by the participating parties. Generally, a historian carries out historical research for the tribunal claimants.
- The Tribunal's process is flexible; it is not required to follow the rules of evidence that generally apply in the courts, and it may adapt its procedures as it thinks fit. For example, it may not allow cross examination, and hearsay or oral evidence is routinely accepted. For example, the Tribunal may follow 'te kawa o te marae'. In contrast, court procedures are stricter and dependent on evidence.
- The Tribunal does not have final authority to decide points of law. The power rests with the courts. However, the Tribunal has exclusive authority to determine the meaning and effect of the Treaty as it is embodied in both the Māori and English texts.
- The Tribunal has a limited power to summon witnesses, require the production of documents, and maintain order at its hearings. It does not have a general power to make orders preventing something from happening or compelling something to happen; nor can it make a party to Tribunal proceedings pay the costs.
- The Tribunal does not settle claims; in fact, it only makes recommendations to the Government. It is not involved in the settlement process, and claimants agree not to pursue matters through the Tribunal while they are engaged in the negotiation process.
- Claims are settled by negotiation with the Government. The Office of Treaty Settlements manages the negotiation of Treaty settlements for the Government, and all matters related to negotiations should be addressed to that office.
- The Tribunal cannot make recommendations over the return of private land. It may inquire into, and report on, claims relating to land that is privately owned, but unless the land is memorialised, the Tribunal may not recommend that it be returned to Māori ownership or that the Crown acquire it. Memorialised lands are lands owned, or formerly owned, by a State-owned enterprise or a tertiary institution, or former New Zealand Railways lands, that have a memorial (or notation) on their certificate of title advising that the Waitangi Tribunal may recommend that the land be returned to Māori ownership.
- The Tribunal can register the claim of any Māori with a grievance against a policy, practice, act, or omission of the Crown. The Tribunal is not required to check that a claimant has a mandate from any group, but it may refuse to inquire into a claim that is considered to be frivolous or vexatious.

The Tribunal process is inquisitorial, not adversarial. It seeks to get to the truth of the matter. The aim is to determine whether a claim is well founded.

=== Tribunal members ===
The Tribunal may have a chairperson and up to 20 members at any one time. Members are appointed by the Governor-General on behalf of the Sovereign on the recommendation of the Minister of Māori Affairs in consultation with the Minister of Justice, for a renewable term of up to three years. For specific inquiries, a panel is composed of three to seven members, at least one of whom must be Māori. The chairperson of the Waitangi Tribunal can also appoint a Māori Land Court judge to act as presiding officer. This panel is then known as the Tribunal for that inquiry, e.g. the Central North Island Tribunal or the Taranaki Tribunal.

As of May 2025, the membership of the Tribunal was:

- Chairperson
  - Chief Judge Dr Caren Fox, Chief Judge Māori Land Court
- Deputy Chairperson
  - Judge Sarah Reeves, Māori Land Court
- Other Māori Land Court judges
- Ordinary members
  - Dr Robyn Anderson, historian
  - Tipene Crisp
  - Ron Crosby, lawyer
  - Philip Crump, lawyer
  - Vanessa Eparaima
  - Derek Fox, broadcaster
  - Grant Hadfield, realtor and Manawatu District Councillor
  - Rex Edward Hale, author and public servant
  - Dr Paul Hamer, historian
  - Prof Rawinia Higgins, academic
  - Dr Ruakere Hond, academic
  - Prue Kapua, lawyer
  - Ron Mark, Mayor of Carterton, former politician and government minister
  - Basil Morrison CNZM, former local politician and president of Local Government New Zealand
  - Kim Ngarimu, consultant
  - Dr Hana O'Regan ONZM, academic
  - Dr Ann Parsonson, historian
  - Dr Grant Phillipson, historian
  - Kevin Prime CNZM, farmer, forester, Environment Court commissioner
  - Dr Thomas Roa, kaumatua
  - Tania Simpson ONZM, director of Auckland International Airport, Meridian Energy, and Tainui Group Holdings
  - Prof Linda Tuhiwai Smith CNZM, academic
  - Dr Monty Soutar ONZM, historian
  - Prof Sir Pou Temara KNZM, academic
  - Tafaoimalo Leilani Tuala-Warren, former Supreme Court of Samoa judge and professor of law at University of Waikato
  - Prof David Williams, historian, lawyer, Anglican priest
  - Ken Williamson, fellow of the Insurance Brokers Association of New Zealand
  - Gerrard Albert
  - Juliet Tainui-Hernandez

=== The Waitangi Tribunal Unit ===
The Waitangi Tribunal Unit is a special jurisdiction unit of the Ministry of Justice which provides support and services necessary for the Tribunal to do its work. Approximately 60 full-time staff work at the Tribunal, who are divided into the research, claims and registration, report writing, and inquiry facilitation teams.

== Notable tribunal inquiries ==
=== Taonga and the Wai 26 and 150 claim regarding radio frequencies ===
In June 1986, the Waitangi Tribunal received the Wai 26 claim that the Treaty of Waitangi was breached by the Crown who failed to await recommendations within the Tribunal's te reo Māori (1986) report before introducing a bill on the Māori language. This raised dispute as Māori were concerned that the bill might preempt and therefore not fully take into account the recommendations of the Waitangi Tribunal report. The second part of the claim identified that Te reo Māori held taonga status and the (then) Broadcasting Corporation of New Zealand "had not provided adequately for Māori radio listeners and television viewers." when the Crown had an obligation to uphold and promote te reo Māori through electronic mediums.

In June 1990, claim Wai 150 was lodged by Sir Graham Latimer on behalf of the New Zealand Māori Council. The claim was in respect of the Rangatiratanga over the allocation of radio frequencies; the claim being that in the absence of an agreement with the Māori, the sale of frequency management licences under the Radiocommunications Act 1989 would be in breach of the Treaty of Waitangi; denying Māori rights to the radio spectrum would therefore deny an instrumental means of providing te reo Māori to New Zealand. The Waitangi Tribunal amalgamated the Wai 26 with the Wai 150 claim. The final report of the Tribunal recommended that the Crown suspend the radio frequency tender process and proceed to negotiate with the Iwi.

=== Ngāi Tahu claim ===
The Ngāi Tahu Maori Trust Board filed the claim with the Waitangi Tribunal in 1986. The claim covered nine different areas and was heard over two years from 1987. The Tribunal released its three-volume report in 1991 – at that time it was the tribunal's most comprehensive inquiry. It found that "the Crown acted unconscionably and in repeated breach of the Treaty of Waitangi" in its land dealings with the tribe, and recommended substantial compensation. Ngāi Tahu also filed a claim in regards to commercial fisheries, in regards to which the Tribunal released its report in 1993. Ngāi Tahu settled with the Crown in 1998, and received $170 million in compensation, an apology, and the return of its sacred mountain Aoraki/Mount Cook (the tribe later gifted this back to the Nation).

=== The Wai 262 claim in respect of mātauranga Māori ===
On 2 July 2011, the Tribunal released its long-awaited report into the Wai 262 claim: "Ko Aotearoa Tēnei" (‘This is Aotearoa’ or ‘This is New Zealand’). The Wai 262 claim concerns the ownership of, and rights to, mātauranga Māori (Māori knowledge) in respect of indigenous flora and fauna. The Wai 262 claim, and the subsequent Ko Aotearoa Tēnei report, is unusual in Tribunal terms because of its wide scope and the contemporary nature of the issues being grappled with. It was the Tribunal's first 'whole-of-government' inquiry, and considers more than 20 government departments and agencies, and makes recommendations as to reforms of "laws, policies or practices relating to health, education, science, intellectual property, indigenous flora and fauna, resource management, conservation, the Māori language, arts and culture, heritage, and the involvement of Māori in the development of New Zealand's positions on international instruments affecting indigenous rights."

In the cover letter of the report, the Tribunal argues that:

"[w]hat we saw and heard in sittings over many years left us in no doubt that unless it is accepted that New Zealand has two founding cultures, not one; unless Māori culture and identity are valued in everything government says and does; and unless they are welcomed into the very centre of the way we do things in this country, nothing will change. Māori will continue to be perceived, and know they are perceived, as an alien and resented minority, a problem to be managed with a seemingly endless stream of taxpayer-funded programmes, but never solved."

=== Water and geothermal rights inquiry ===
The New Zealand Māori Council brought the claim before the Tribunal in early 2012, arguing that the sale of 49 per cent of Mighty River Power (now Mercury Energy), Meridian Energy, and Genesis Energy would prejudice any possible future recognition of Māori rights in water and geothermal resources. On 1 August 2012, the Tribunal released a memorandum finding that the government should temporarily halt its asset sales programme until it had released its interim full report. The pre-publications report was subsequently released on 24 August, and suggested that the government should postpone the asset sales programme until the issue had been resolved with Māori around the country. This finding was reached on the basis that, if the government were to proceed with the partial-privatisation programme, it would reduce its ability to resolve outstanding claims to water and geothermal rights. In terms of potential avenues for resolution, the Tribunal recommended a national hui be called so that all parties to the dispute could voice their positions.

‘[T]here is a nexus between the asset to be transferred (shares in the power companies) and the Māori claim (to rights in the water used by the power companies), sufficient to require a halt if the sale would put the issue of rights recognition and remedy beyond the Crown’s ability to deliver.’

In response to the findings of The Tribunal, the National Government postponed the float of Mighty River Power until early 2013, but rejected calls for a national hui and the "shares plus" idea. Nevertheless, a hui was called for September 2012, but no representatives from the Government or the National Party attended. The issue was taken to court, with the courts ultimately ruling that the partial privatisation programme would not affect the Crown's ability to provide redress to Maori, so the sales could continue.

=== Te Paparahi o te Raki inquiry ===
The Tribunal, Te Paparahi o te Raki inquiry (Wai 1040) is in the process of considering the Māori and Crown understandings of He Whakaputanga o te Rangatiratanga / The Declaration of Independence 1835 and Te Tiriti o Waitangi / the Treaty of Waitangi 1840. This aspect of the inquiry raises issues as to the nature of sovereignty and whether the Māori signatories to the Treaty of Waitangi intended to transfer sovereignty.

The first stage of the report was released in November 2014. It found that Ngāpuhi chiefs never agreed to give up their sovereignty when they signed the Treaty of Waitangi in 1840. Tribunal manager Julie Tangaere said at the report's release to the Ngāpuhi claimants:

"Your tupuna [ancestors] did not give away their mana at Waitangi, at Waimate, at Mangungu. They did not cede their sovereignty. This is the truth you have been waiting a long time to hear."

=== TPP/CPTPP inquiry ===
In late June 2015, several prominent Māori figures including Dr Papaarangi Reid, Moana Jackson, Rikirangi Gage, Angeline Greensill, Hone Harawira and Moana Maniapoto filed a claim and urgent application with the Tribunal alleging that the New Zealand Government was breaching the Treaty of Waitangi in the way it was negotiating the Trans Pacific Partnership Agreement (TPP). The claimants argued that New Zealand's adoption of the agreement would not require the consent of the New Zealand Parliament, objected to the lack of Māori involvement in the negotiation process and there was no legal obligation to assess the implications of the TPPA for the Treaty of Waitangi. In response to the claim, the Government argued that the secret nature of the TPP negotiations would allow the New Zealand Crown to negotiate in the best interests of the country. The Government also said that it had take steps to show that it had been considering Māori interests under the Treaty and maintained that it has been consulting with Māori in relation to the TPP. In early May 2016, the Waitangi Tribunal backed the inclusion of a Treaty of Waitangi clause in the finalised TPP trade deal. However, the Tribunal expressed concern that a clause allowing foreign investors to bring claims against the New Zealand Government could affect the Crown's willingness or ability to meet its Treaty obligations.

In mid November 2021, the Waitangi Tribunal found that the New Zealand Crown had failed to meet its Treaty obligations to protect Māori interests as part of the Comprehensive and Progressive Agreement for Trans-Pacific Partnership (CPTPP), the successor to the TPP, but acknowledged that several major changes occurred in the negotiation process. While the issues around the Crown's engagement with Māori over the TPP/CPTPP and secrecy were resolved through mediation, the Tribunal found there were significant risks to Māori in the e-commerce provisions of the CPTPP and data sovereignty. As a result of the 2016 Tribunal ruling, a Māori advisory committee called Te Taumata was established while a second body known as Ngā Toki Whakarururanga was established as a result of the mediation agreement. Maniapoto welcomed the 2021 ruling as a vindication of Māori efforts to protect their Treaty rights in international agreements.

=== COVID-19 pandemic ===
On 19 November 2021, several members of the New Zealand Māori Council including Archdeacon Harvey Ruru and Tā Edward Durie filed an application for an urgent inquiry by the Waitangi Tribunal into Government's response to the COVID-19 pandemic in New Zealand for Māori. The plaintiffs argued that the Government's vaccination rollout policies and plans to ease lockdown restrictions in December 2021 placed Māori at risk.

On 21 December, the Waitangi Tribunal ruled that the Government's vaccination rollout and "traffic light system" breached the Treaty of Waitangi's principles of active protection and equity. The Tribunal criticised the Government's decision to prioritise those aged over 65 years and with health conditions during the vaccine rollout, arguing that they failed to address the youthful nature of the Māori population and its health vulnerabilities. The Tribunal also ruled that the Government's transition to the "traffic light system" failed to take into account the lower Māori vaccination rate and health needs. The Tribunal also found that Government had not adequately consulted with Māori health providers and leaders and determined that efforts to address Māori needs such as the "Māori communities Covid-19 fund" were inadequate. The Waitangi Tribunal recommended that the Government improve data collection, improve engagement with the Māori community, and provided better support for ongoing vaccination efforts, testing, contact tracing, and support for Māori infected with COVID-19. The Tribunal's ruling was welcomed by the Māori Council.

=== Hearings during the Sixth National Government (2023–present) ===
Following the 2023 New Zealand general election, the Sixth National Government and its ACT and New Zealand First coalition partners announced plans to roll out several policies, a move to which Māori objected. These included prioritising the use of the English language in the public service; a proposed Treaty Principles Bill; abolishing Te Aka Whai Ora (the Māori Health Authority); repealing Section 7AA of the Oranga Tamariki Act 1989 (Children's and Young People's Well-being Act 1989) and the Smokefree Environments and Regulated Products (Smoked Tobacco) Amendment Act 2022. In response to these developments, the Waitangi Tribunal received several claims by various iwi (tribes) and individuals challenging the Government's policies:

==== Māori language urgent claim ====
On 12 December 2023, the Tauranga-based iwi Ngai Te Rangi Settlement Trust filed an urgent claim arguing that the Government's decision to discontinue financial incentives for public servants to learn the Māori language and directive for government departments Waka Kotahi (NZ Transport Agency) and Te Whatu Ora (Health NZ) to give primacy to their English names breached the Treaty of Waitangi and the New Zealand Bill of Rights.

On 10 June 2024, the Waitangi Tribunal began hearing Ngai Te Rangi's Māori language claim, which was supported by Ngā Kaiwhakapūmau i te Reo (the Wellington Māori Language Board). The hearing was held in Wellington, with a contingent of iwi representatives travelling to the capital. The Tribunal heard from both iwi and Crown-nominated relatives. On the first day of the hearing, Ngai Te Rangi's lawyer Mataanuku Mahuika argued that the Government had failed to abide with its legal obligation under the Māori Language Act to consult with iwi on issues regarding the Māori language. During the hearing, the Crown's counsel said that the Government was committed to uphold its obligations under the Māori Language Act. Ngāi Te Rangi representative Roimata Stanley-Kaweroa claimed that the Government had targeted the Māori language and its speakers since it had come into power. Stanley Kaweroa only spoke in Māori during the proceedings, which led to long pauses between questions and answers. While National's coalition agreement with New Zealand First contained a commitment that all public service departments should communicate primarily in English and prioritise their Pakeha names, Crown lawyers testified that Public Service Minister Nicola Willis had decided against issuing directives to the public sector regarding the use of Māori but had given latitude to individual ministers and their agencies. Veteran civil servant and iwi leader Haami Piripi contended that the coalition agreement would override any minister's commitment to the Māori language. The tribunal is expected to last until 14 June.

On 11 June, the Crown delivered its case. Acting Public Service Commissioner Heather Baggot, who is of Ngāti Maniapoto and Te Āti Awa descent, was cross-examined by Māori lawyer Mataanuku Mahuika. Baggot testified that all government departments apart from Te Puni Kōkiri (Ministry for Māori Development) and Oranga Tamariki (Ministry for Children) had their legal names in English. Mahuika responded by arguing about the changing place names of Mount Egmont and Mount Taranaki.

==== Te Aka Whai Ora urgent claims ====
On 14 December 2023, Lady Tureiti Moxon and Janice Kuka filed the "Wai 3307 Te Aka Whai Ora (Māori Health Authority) Urgent Claim," challenging the Government's plans to dissolve Te Aka Whai Ora (the Māori Health Authority), claiming that it breached the Treaty of Waitangi. On 18 December, the Government filed a memorandum of counsel opposing Moxon and Kuka's claim but conceded that it had no specific plan to address poor Māori health outcomes and had not consulted Māori in accordance with Treaty principles.

The Waitangi Tribunal was scheduled to hold an urgent hearing between 29 February and 1 March 2024 to critique the Government's Te Aka Whai Ora repeal bill. However, the Government decided to pass urgent legislation dissolving the Māori Health Authority on 27 February. Since the Tribunal has no authority to consider issues being submitted before Parliament, its jurisdiction ended before the hearings could begin. In response, Lady Moxon denounced the Government's decision to pass legislation dissolving the Māori Health Authority before the scheduled Tribunal hearing as disrespectful.

In mid May 2024, the Tribunal agreed to hear a second claim by Lady Moxon and Kuka for a "priority inquiry" into the Crown's alternative proposals to improve Māori health in the absence of a Māori Health Authority. This priority is scheduled for October 2024 and will also look at the Government's processes for disestablishing Te Aka Whai Ora. In January 2024, the Crown had decline to articulate its alternative proposal for improving Māori health, claiming it was still in development. By April 2024, the Crown had responded that Māori health was the subject of an ongoing law reform process. The Tribunal also directed the Crown to file a memorandum with an update on the matter by 27 May 2024.

On 29 November 2024, the Tribunal found that the Crown had breached the Treaty of Waitangi by disestablishing Te Aka Whai Ora. The Tribunal recommended that the Government reconsider establishing a stand-alone Māori health authority and consult with Māori. The claimants Moxon and Kuka welcomed the Tribunal's report. On 25 September 2026, the Tribunal released its second report on the disestablishment of Te Aka Whai Ora, which criticised the Crown for not developing an alternative Māori health plan after its dissolution and failing to meaningfully consult with Māori on dissolving that agency. The Tribunal also recommended that the Crown revisit the idea of reestablishing a Māori Health Authority.

==== Section 7AA claim ====
On 23 December 2023 Te Tāwharau o Ngāti Pūkenga, the post settlement body for the Ngāti Pūkenga iwi, filed an urgent claim challenging the Government's plans to repeal Section 7AA of the Oranga Tamariki Act 1989. Section 7AA requires Oranga Tamariki (the Ministry for Children) to take into account Māori children's ancestry or whakapapa (genealogy) when uplifting children in order to keep them connected to their culture and families. Minister for Children and ACT MP Karen Chhour had lobbied for the repeal of Section 7AA, arguing that the policy prioritised the Treaty of Waitangi and cultural needs over the well-being of vulnerable Māori children.

In mid-April 2024, the Waitangi Tribunal summoned Chhour to attend an urgent inquiry into the proposed repeal of Section 7AA of the Oranga Tamariki Act. The Tribunal requested Chhour submit figures on the number of caregivers who had expressed concern about the impact of Section 7AA and examples of children being placed into unsafe conditions as a result of Section 7AA. On 17 April, Crown lawyers filed judicial proceedings in the High Court seeking to block the Tribunal's summons. On 24 April, the High Court overturned the Waitangi Tribunal's subpoena to Chhour. In response, Treaty rights activist and lawyer Annete Sykes confirmed that she would be appealing the High Court's ruling. According to Crown Law, Chhour plans to introduce legislation repealing Section 7AA in mid-May. Once Parliament has received the repeal bill, the Tribunal is compelled by law to cease any investigations into the matter. On 29 April, the Tribunal released an interim report expressing concern that the repeal of Section 7AA would harm vulnerable children. The full Tribunal report is due on 12 May 2024.

On 11 May, the Tribunal ruled that the Government's proposed repeal of Section 7AA of the Oranga Tamariki Act breached the Treaty's guarantee of Māori self-determination and the Treaty principles of partnership and active protection. They urged the Government to stop work on repealing the legislation. On 13 May, the New Zealand Court of Appeal overturns the High Court decision squashing the Waitangi Tribunal's summons to Chhour to testify at a hearing about the Government's legislation to overturn Section 7AA. That same day, the Government's repeal legislation was introduced into Parliament. The Oranga Tamariki (Repeal of Section 7AA) Amendment Act 2025 passed into law on 3 April 2025.

==== Smokefree repeal legislation claims ====
On 3 February 2024, public health strategist Beverly Te Huia and the anti-smoking coalition Te Rōpū Tupeka Kore filed separate claims opposing the Government's proposed repeal of the Smokefree Environments and Regulated Products (Smoked Tobacco) Amendment Act 2022. The Tribunal was scheduled to hold a hearing on the Smokefree repeal legislation between late February and early March 2024. On 27 February, the Government also introduced another urgent bill repealing the Smokefree legislation. Since the Tribunal has no authority to consider issues being submitted before Parliament, its jurisdiction ended before the hearings could begin. The Smokefree repeal legislation passed into law on 28 February.

==== Māori wards claim ====
On 8 May 2024, Pita Tipene, chairperson for Te Rūnanga o Ngāti Hine, challenged the Government's decision to reinstate referendums on Māori wards and constituencies in local government bodies as an attack on their efforts to uphold their Treaty of Waitangi obligations. The Tribunal will hold an urgent inquiry prior to the introduction of the Government's Māori wards referendum legislation on 20 May 2024. On 17 May, the Tribunal ruled that the Government's plans to reinstate referendum requirements violated the Treaty of Waitangi.

==== Treaty Principles claim ====
On 9 May 2024, Ngāpuhi Kaumātua (tribal elder) Hone Sadler and several claimants argued that ACT's proposed Treaty Principles Bill's interpretation of the Treaty of Waitangi was "inaccurate and misleading." They also contended that Māori never ceded sovereignty to the New Zealand Crown. On 15 May, the Tribunal heard testimony from University of Auckland Māori Studies Professor Margaret Mutu, who described ACT's Co-Government Policy Paper as "nonsensical" and as misinterpretation of the Treaty. In addition, Northland iwi Ngāti Kahu submitted a letter to King Charles III, calling on him to stop what they called a "violent attack" on the Treaty.

On 16 August 2024, the Waitangi Tribunal released its interim report into the ACT party's Treaty Principles Bill and New Zealand First's proposed review of the Treaty clauses. The Tribunal made four recommendations: that the Treaty Principles Bill be scrapped, that the Crown constitute a Cabinet Māori-Crown relations committee that has oversight of the Crown's Treaty of Waitangi policies, that the Treaty clause review policy be suspended while it be reconceptualised through engagement with Māori, and that the Crown undertake a process to undo damage to the Māori-Crown relationship.

==== Proposed foreshore and seabed changes ====
On 21 May 2024, Treaty Negotiations Minister Paul Goldsmith, Oceans Fisheries Minister Shane Jones met with representatives of the seafood industry to discuss industry concerns about Māori customary marine titles and claims. On 30 July, Goldsmith announced that the National-led coalition government would disregard a 2023 New Zealand Court of Appeal ruling that lowered the threshold for proving Māori customary marine title claims. Goldsmith announce that the Government would also amend section 58 of the Marine and Coastal Area (Takutai Moana) Act 2011 to require marine title claimants to prove they had continual exclusive use and ownership of the area since 1840. This proposed law change was part of National's coalition agreement with NZ First.

On 26 August 2024, the Waitangi Tribunal commenced an urgent inquiry into the Government's plans to change the law to tighten the threshold for Māori customary marine title claims. The hearing was heard by Maori Land Court Judge Miharo Armstrong along with Tribunal members Ron Crosby and Pou Temara. On the first day, Treaty of Waitangi lawyer Tom Bennion criticised the Government for its perceived "two-faced" approach towards Māori and seeking to undermine Māori customary marine claims. On the second day, the Tribunal heard testimony from Te Arawhiti (Office for Māori Crown Relations) deputy secretary Tui Marsh, who had attended the 21 May meeting between cabinet ministers and seafood industry representatives.

On 13 September 2024, the Waitangi Tribunal released its initial report into the proposed changes to the Marine and Coastal Area (Takutai Moana) Act 2011. The Tribunal concluded that the Government had ignored official advice, failed to consult with Māori and breached several principles including active protection and good governance.

==== Regulatory Standards Bill ====
On 29 January 2025 the advocacy group Toitū te Tiriti, which organised the Hīkoi mō te Tiriti, filed an urgent Waitangi Tribunal claim opposing the proposed Regulatory Standards Bill. They claimed that the proposed legislation undermined the Treaty of Waitangi and would adversely affect Māori today and for future generations. In mid May 2025, the Tribunal heard evidence from lawyers representing 18,000 New Zealanders opposed to the bill. On 16 May, the Tribunal released an interim report urging the New Zealand Crown to halt work on the Regulatory Standards Bill to facilitate "meaningful consultation" with Māori.

==== New Zealand citizenship law ====
On 31 October 2025, the Waitangi Tribunal issued a ruling that the Citizenship Act 1977 breached the Treaty of Waitangi by limiting eligibility for citizenship by descent for Māori people to one generation and failing to recognise Māori as tangata whenua ("People of the Land"). The Tribunal was acting on a claim submitted by Ngāpuhi man John Ruddock, a New Zealand citizen by descent whose overseas-born children were denied automatic New Zealand citizenship since neither of their parents were born in New Zealand. Ruddock's claim was supported by other witnesses including actress Keisha Castle-Hughes, who was born in Australia and whose daughter was born in the United States; making them ineligible for New Zealand citizenship by descent under current law. The Tribunal recommended that Parliament amend the Citizenship Act 1977 to include a Treaty clause recognising Māori as tangata whenua, create a whakapapa pathway for Māori to claim New Zealand citizenship, and consult with Māori communities when designing citizenship legislation. Minister of Internal Affairs Brooke van Velden acknowledged the Tribunal's decision but stated that her government had no plans to review the Citizenship Act 1977. van Velden stated that citizenship should not be granted on the basis of race.

==== School board and curriculum changes ====
In late 2025, the Northland iwi (tribe) Ngāti Hine and hapū (clan) Te Kapotai sought an urgent Waitangi Tribunal inquiry into the New Zealand government's decision to scrap school boards' legal obligations to uphold the Treaty of Waitangi and reset the New Zealand school curriculum, claiming they were inconsistent with the Treaty and caused "significant and irreversible prejudice" to Māori. On 11 March 2026, the Tribunal granted urgency to the plaintiffs' claim. By that time, the two parties had been joined by the primary school teachers' union, the New Zealand Educational Institute (NZEI). On 15 April 2026, the Tribunal began hearing the urgent inquiry into the government's school board and curriculum changes, which is expected to last until 17 April

On 15 May 2026, the Waitangi Tribunal's interim report found that the Government's proposed overhaul of Treaty clauses in education law constituted a breach of the Principles of the Treaty of Waitangi, and urged the Government to abandon work on such legislation and begin meaningful co-design with Māori. The report also criticised the Government's consultation with Māori as inadequate and Justice Minister Goldsmith's reliance on the select committee process. while the NZEI president Ripeka Lessels welcomed the Tribunal's findings that the Government had failed to adequately consult with Māori, Goldsmith said the Government was seeking "greater consistency" in how Treaty clauses operated across legislation.

On 17 September, the Tribunal released its full report on the Government's school curriculum changes, which concluded that the rewrite of the school curriculum was ideologically-motivated, aided by people "hostile" towards Māori knowledge, and breached multiple Treaty principles. While Education Minister Erica Stanford said the Government would take the report into consideration, Green MP Lawrence Xu-Nan accused the Government of prioritising overseas lobbyists over Māori. On 30 October, the Tribunal ruled that the Crown had breached the Treaty of Waitangi by passing legislation in 2026 stripping school boards of their Treaty obligations. The Tribunal found that this law change created "widespread sector confusion" and damaged relations between Māori and the Crown.

==== Treaty clauses review ====
Between 2 and 3 June 2026, the Waitangi Tribunal held a two-day hearing in Wellington on the Government's proposal to weaken Treaty of Waitangi clauses in over 20 laws including the Smokefree Environments and Regulated Products Act 1990, Data and Statistics Act 2022 and the Digital Identity Services Trust Framework Act 2023. As part of the National Party's coalition agreement with New Zealand First, Justice Minister Paul Goldsmith had confirmed that the Government would seek to remove Treaty references from six acts and weaken them in ten other laws. The Tribunal had launched Te Tinihanga o Ngā Mātāpono o Te Tiriti (the Treaty Principles Reform Urgent Inquiry) in May 2026 following an application by Ngāti Hine for an urgent inquiry, which argued that the reforms would cause "significant and irreversible prejudice" to Māori if they were allowed to proceed without scrutiny. Tribunal's panel consisted of Judge Caren Fox, Derek Fox, Paul Hamer and Kevin Prime. The Tribunal heard from several parties including law lecturer Carwyn Jones, the anti-smoking collective "Te Rōpū Tupeka Kore" (Smokefree Aotearoa) and its representative Hone Harawira, the National Iwi Chairs Forum, Te Whakakitenga o Waikato, Te Kahui Raraunga, Te Rūnanga o Ngāti Ranginui, and representatives of the Crown.

On 31 July 2026, the Tribunal criticised the Government's plan to review references to the Treaty of Waitangi across 19 laws and accused cabinet Ministers of putting politics ahead of Māori welfare. The Tribunal urged the Government to pause work on this review and engage in "meaningful consultation" with Māori stakeholders on the review and their potential impact on Treaty settlements.

==== 2026 Ohakea land contamination ====
In mid-July 2026, the Waitangi Tribunal heard complaint from representatives of Ngāti Parewahawaha about the environmental effects of PFAS chemicals linked to RNZAF Ohakea's foam-based firefighting equipment on the surrounding landscape. The iwi/tribe said that base's chemical pollution harmed their relationship with the environment. They also sought accountability from the New Zealand Crown and New Zealand Defence Force.

==== Disability system breaches ====
On 5 September 2026, the Tribunal found that the New Zealand Crown had breached the principles of the Treaty of Waitangi by failing to consult with Māori communities while designing the disability system. The Tribunal had heard from 48 claimants and 13 interested parties over a period of 11 weeks between 2022 and 2025.

==== Reactions ====
The Waitangi Tribunal's decision to hear these claims drew criticism from several figures in the Sixth National Government including NZ First MP and cabinet minister Shane Jones and ACT leader David Seymour, who regarded them as interferences into government policy delivery. On two occasions in January and February 2024, Jones called for the Tribunal's powers to be reviewed and claimed the Government was delivering on election promises, stating that "an institution that's been around for 50 years should not expect to continue on uncritically for another set of decades without being reviewed." After the Waitangi Tribunal summoned Chhour in mid-April 2024, Jones likened the Tribunal to behaving like a star chamber. Jones' remarks were criticised by the Māori Law Society, who issued a letter to Prime Minister Christopher Luxon and Attorney-General Judith Collins complaining that Jones' remarks breached the Cabinet Manual and undermined the Tribunal's work. Similarly, Seymour accused the Waitangi Tribunal of "racial fanaticism" and defended his ACT colleague Chhour's efforts to repeal Section 7AA of the Oranga Tamariki Act. In response to media coverage, Luxon conceded that Jones and Seymour's remarks were "ill-considered," adding "we expect all ministers to exercise good judgment on matters like this."

A provision within National's coalition agreement with New Zealand First is that the coalition government will "amend the Waitangi Tribunal legislation to refocus the scope, purpose and nature of its inquiries back to the original intent of that legislation." Ahunga Tikanga head law lecturer Carwyn Jones has described the wording of the agreement as vague while Victoria University of Wellington law lecturer Dr Luke Fitzmaurice-Brown expressed concerns about limiting the scope and powers of the Tribunal. By contrast, former Prime Minister Jenny Shipley and former Treaty Negotiations Minister Doug Graham have supported reviewing the powers and scope of the Waitangi Tribunal.

During the lead-up to the 2026 New Zealand general election, the ACT and New Zealand First parties campaigned on abolishing the Waitangi Tribunal once all outstanding claims filed by 1 September 2008 had been resolved. By contrast, Te Pāti Māori has campaigned on creating an independent "Te Tiriti Commission" to investigate alleged breaches of the Treaty of Waitangi by the New Zealand Crown and making the Waitangi Tribunal's recommendations legally binding.

== See also ==
- Treaty of Waitangi claims and settlements
- Treaty Principles Bill
- New Zealand Wars
- New Zealand land confiscations
- History of New Zealand
- New Zealand Maori Council v Attorney-General 1987

== Bibliography ==
- Moon, Paul (1 January 2017). "Originalism and the treaty of Waitangi". Journal of New Zealand Studies (24): 2–14. ISSN 1176-306X.
- Mutu, Margaret (October 2019). "The Treaty Claims Settlement Process in New Zealand and its Impact on Māori". Land. 8 (24): 152. doi:10.3390/land8100152. hdl:2292/49204. S2CID 211389910. (Note: Not objective - see 2.1)
