= New Zealand Veterinary Association =

Professional scientific association

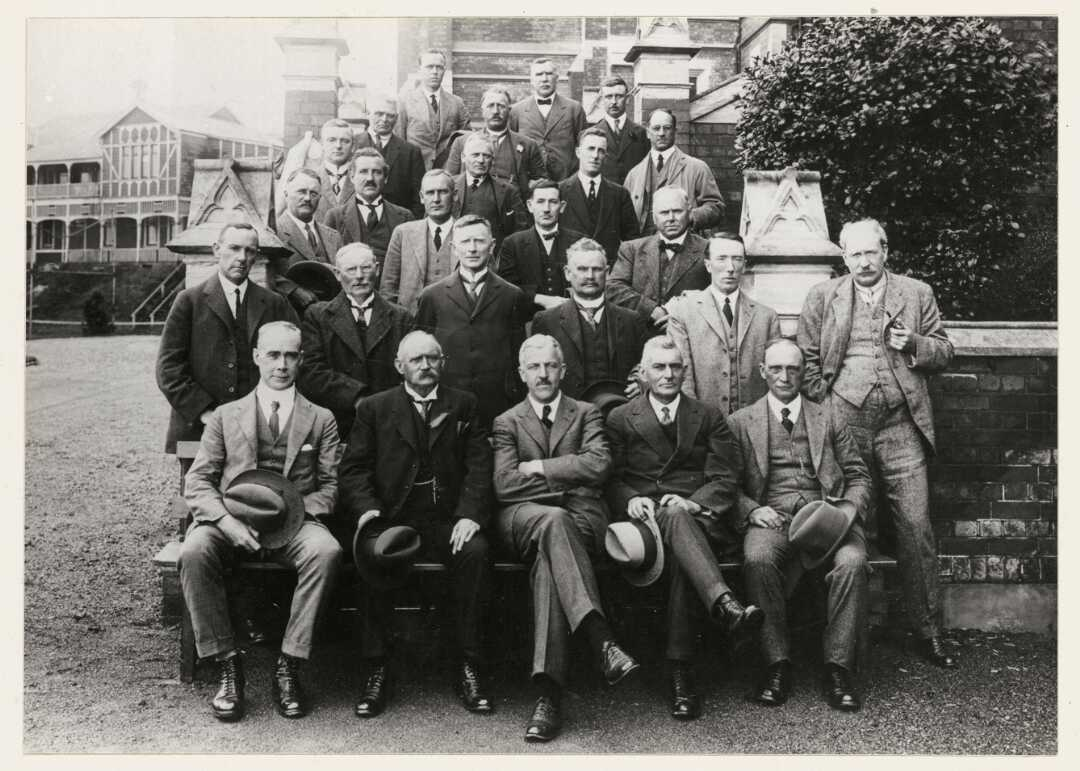
- The first meeting of the NZVA in 1923
- Abbreviation: NZAS
- Formation: 1923
- Headquarters: Wellington
- President: Kate Hill
- Website: nzva.org.nz

The New Zealand Veterinary Association (NZVA) is a professional organisation in New Zealand.

The association was established in 1923 to "assist in the development of the profession, including the registration of veterinarians, making submissions to Parliament and other bodies, negotiating conditions of employment and to advocate veterinary training in New Zealand". In 2023, the organisation's stated purpose is "To build exceptional working lives as veterinary professionals by providing support, resources and advocacy."

== History ==
As of 2023, the elected President is Kate Hill. On 29 May 2023, the organisation announced that it would use the Māori term Te Pae Kīrehe in addition to its English name in order to be more inclusive. The translation was provided by Rawinia Higgins, Chair of the Māori Language Commission (Māori: Te Taura Whiri i te Reo Māori).

== Activities ==
The NZAS has fifteen regional networks throughout New Zealand and twelve special interest branches. It hosts several annual conferences, meetings and events for members.

The NZAS publishes the New Zealand Veterinary Journal, as well as the magazine VetScript and SciQuest, an e-library of Australian and New Zealand veterinary publications.

== Awards ==
The NZAS gives out a number of awards, including:

- Outstanding Service Award (established 2002) to recognise "individuals who deserve special recognition for service on behalf of the New Zealand Veterinary Association Te Pae Kīrehe (NZVA)".
- President's Award, which "recognises meritorious service to the veterinary profession in the broadest sense".
- Honorary Life Membership, which "recognises individuals whose contribution to the New Zealand Veterinary Association Te Pae Kīrehe (NZVA) has been of an exceptional nature".
- Veterinary Impact Award, established in 2017, for "an individual who has made a considerable positive impact for the veterinary profession, animal health or welfare, or public health during the past two years. Such impact could have been made through any field of veterinary endeavour, for example clinical practice, research, education, or veterinary politics."
- Young Veterinarian Award, established in 2017, for individuals up to the age of 35 "who have shown outstanding veterinary, communication and leadership skills since graduating as a veterinarian".

Notable recipients include Richard Wild, who was awarded the President's Award in 2016.

== Honorary life members ==
Honorary life members include Jack Filmer, Geoff Moon, Cyril Hopkirk, Bill Manktelow, Neil Bruère, and Jenny Weston.
