= Maiava Iulai Toma =

Ombudsman of Samoa

3rd Samoan Ombudsman
- In office 1994–2020
- Nominated by: Tofilau Eti Alesana
- Appointed by: Malietoa Tanumafili II
- Preceded by: Vaovasamanaia Filipo
- Succeeded by: Luamanuvao Katalaina Sapolu

Personal details
- Born: Samoa
- Education: University of the South Pacific

Maiava Iulai Toma is a Samoan diplomat and civil servant. He served as Samoa's Ombudsman from 1994 — 2020.

Maiava was born in Samoa and educated in Hamilton, New Zealand. While later serving as Ombudsman he completed a Bachelor of Laws at the University of the South Pacific.

== Civil servant and diplomat ==
He worked as a civil servant, serving as Secretary to the Samoan Government, chief executive of the Department of Prime Minister, Foreign Affairs & Cabinet, and Commissioner to the South Pacific Commission. In January 1978 he was appointed ambassador to the United States, permanent representative to the United Nations, and High Commissioner to Canada. He was recalled from those positions in 1982 by the new government of Vaʻai Kolone, sent back when Tofilau Eti Alesana took power later that year, and finally recalled in January 1983 to return to his old role as secretary to the government.

== Ombudsman ==
In 1994 Maiava was appointed Ombudsman. Shortly after his appointment he was asked by the government to investigate auditor-general Sua Rimoni Ah Chong's findings of corruption by government ministers. His report cleared the ministers, and was used by the government as justification to suspend Ah Chong. In 1998 he chaired a commission of inquiry into the leaking of Prime Minister Tofilau Eti Alesana's police record, in which he ordered the media not to report on proceedings. In 2000 he chaired the Electoral Reform Commission. His appointment to the position caused another member, Savea Sano Malifa, to resign.

In 2007 an inquiry by Maiava into sexual harassment by the chief executive of the Samoa Tourism authority saw the chief executive fired. In 2008 he chaired a commission of inquiry into the smuggling of weapons from American Samoa aboard the police patrol boat Nafanua. The inquiry found police commissioner Papalii Lorenese Neru and the Nafanua's captain in breach of duty and recommended a criminal investigation, but the latter recommendation was ignored by the government.

In 2013 he led an inquiry into mismanagement and abuse of power at Tafaigata prison which led to police commissioner Lilomaiava Fou Taioalo being fired.

In 2016 he led a major inquiry into domestic violence in Samoa. The inquiry reported back in 2018, recommending the creation of a Family Violence Prevention Office.

In 2018 he opposed proposals by the Samoan government to reinstate corporal punishment in schools. In 2020 he opposed the government's Land and Titles Bill.

He retired in 2020 and was replaced by Luamanuvao Katalaina Sapolu.
