= Fepuleai Ameperosa Roma =

Fepuleai Ameperosa Roma (born ~1977) is a Samoan judge. He has been a judge of the Supreme Court of Samoa since 15 January 2020.

In 1998, Fepuleai graduated from the University of the South Pacific law school. After working for the Inland Revenue Department and Samoa National Provident Fund, he became a staff solicitor at Sapolu and Lussick, where he was mentored by Luamanuvao Katalaina Sapolu. He then established his own firm, and worked as a defence counsel. In 2014 he became the youngest judge ever appointed to the District Court of Samoa. He has also sat on the Land and Titles Court of Samoa. In January 2020 he was appointed to the Supreme Court of Samoa.

Fepuleai is married to Deputy President of the Lands and Titles Court Siliga Lauano Diana Roma.
