= Mata Tuatagaloa =

Samoan judge

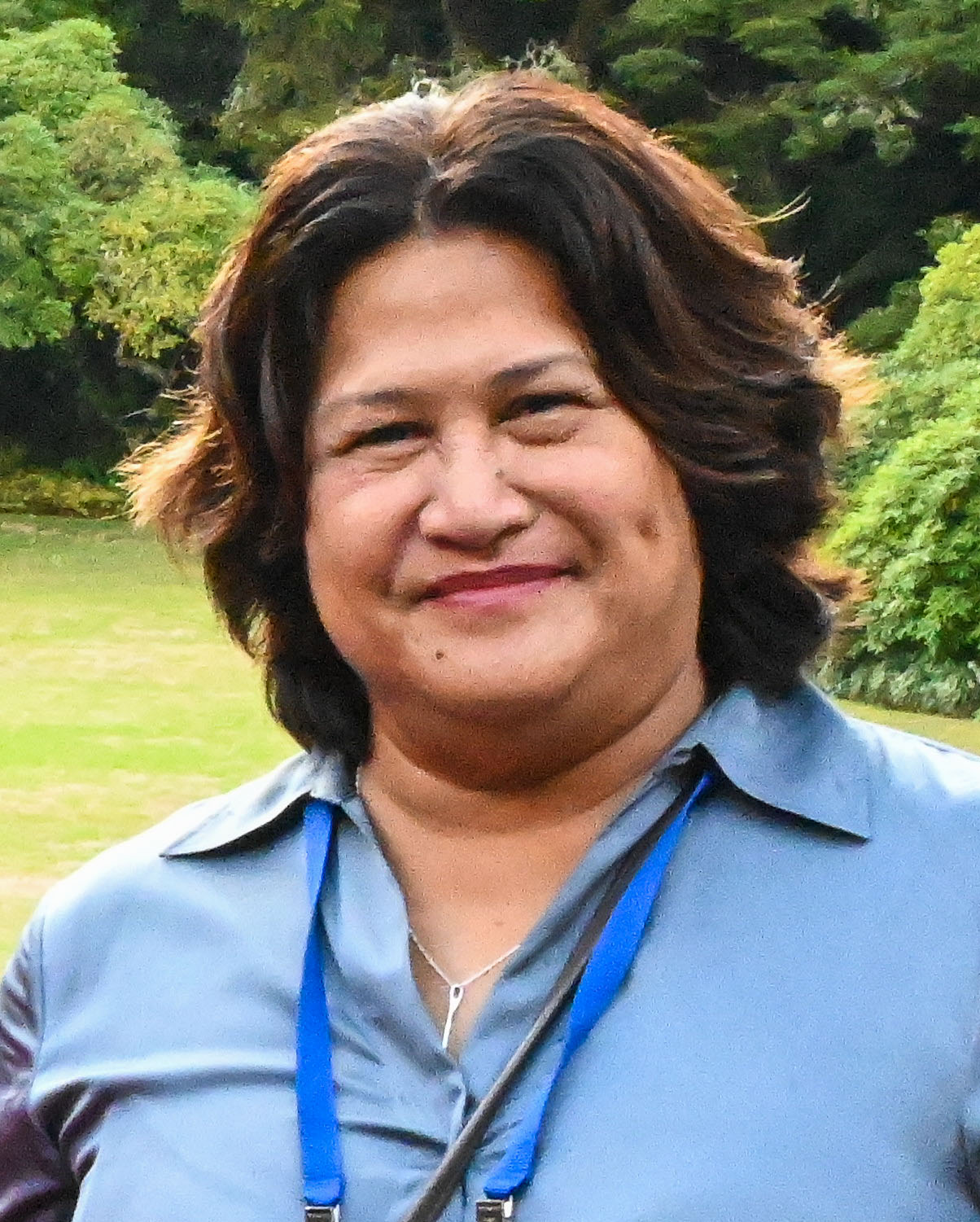
Tuatagaloa in 2025

Mata Keli Tuatagaloa is a Samoan judge. She was the first woman judge in Samoa, having been appointed to the District Court of Samoa in 2011, and has been a judge of the Supreme Court of Samoa since August 2015. New Zealand judge Ida Malosi had been the first woman to be appointed to the Supreme Court, however her appointment was on a temporary basis and Tuatagaloa was the first woman to be permanently appointed.

Tuatagaloa was born in Samoa however she obtained her legal education in New Zealand and Australia, graduating with a Bachelor of Arts from Waikato University, a Bachelor of Laws from the University of NSW and pursued further legal studies at the Australian National University. In 2000 Tuatagaloa became a partner at the law firm Brunt Kell, before moving in 2007 to be a partner at Richards Law Firm. Tuatagaloa was also the president of the Samoa Law Society.

In 2011 Tuatagaloa was appointed a judge of the District Court and heard mostly criminal trials in both the District Court and the Youth Court.

In 2015 Tuatagaloa was appointed to the Supreme Court and continued to hear criminal trials. In 2016 Tuatagaloa heard charges of forgery and fraud against Associate Minister Peseta Vaifou Tevaga. Tuatagaloa found the prosecution failed to prove the charges and they were dismissed. Tuatagaloa was described by Talamua Online News as being tough on domestic violence, after sentencing a man to 11 years and 9 months in prison for attempted murder after he attacked a woman with a machete, breaching a protection order against him.

Tuatagaloa has sat in the Alcohol and Drugs Court since its establishment in February 2016 and credited the court process and engagement of the community with a reduction in alcohol related cases from 61% to 55% of all cases.

In October 2020 she became Acting Chief Justice after Chief Justice Satiu Simativa Perese was evacuated to New Zealand for medical treatment.
