= Pou Temara =

New Zealand Māori academic (1948–2026)

Sir Pou Temara KNZM
- Tā Pou Te Rangiua Temara
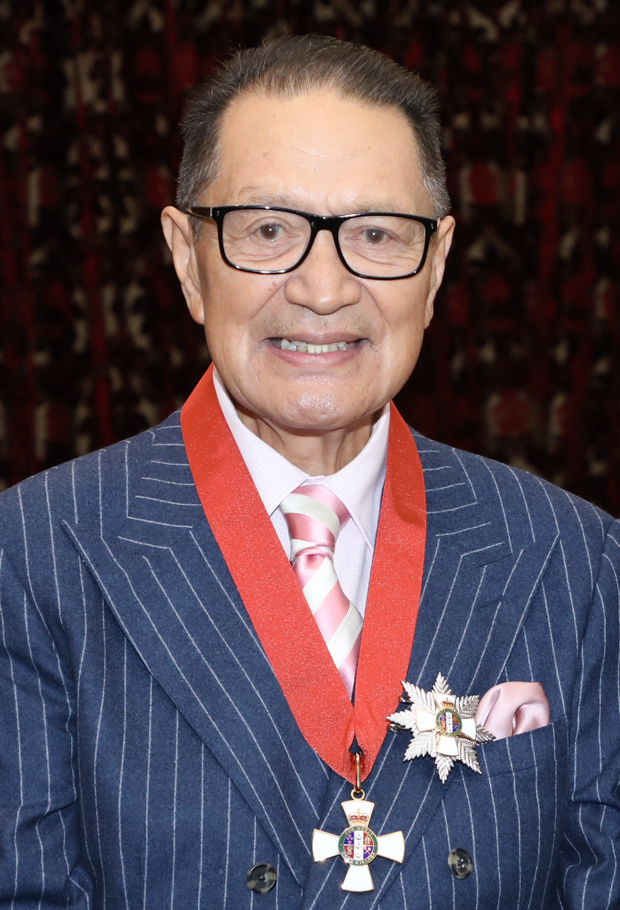
- Temara in 2021
- Born: William Te Rangiua Temara; 1948; Ruatāhuna, New Zealand
- Died: 8 November 2026 (aged 78)

Academic background
- Education: Victoria University of Wellington

Academic work
- Discipline: Te reo Māori; Tikanga Māori

Sir William Te Rangiua "Pou" Temara (1948 – 8 November 2026) was a New Zealand academic. He was professor of Māori language and tikanga Māori (practices) at the University of Waikato, and a cultural authority on whaikōrero (oratory), whakapapa (genealogy) and karakia (prayers and incantations). Prior to working at Waikato, he taught at Victoria University of Wellington, and at Te Whare Wānanga o Awanuiārangi. He was latterly professor of Māori philosophy at Awanuiārangi. He was a member of the Ngāi Tūhoe iwi (tribe).

== Early life and education ==
Temara was born in 1948 in Ruatāhuna, the son of George Temara, a WWII veteran of the Māori Battalion, and Puti (Nani) Tinimēne. He was his mother's first child and so, as was common Māori practice in those times, was raised by her parents, Tamahou Tinimēne and Pareraututu. When he was about 10 months old, his grandparents and he moved from Ruatāhuna to a small clearing in the Te Urewera forest between Maungapōhatu and Rūātoki, where there was just the three of them. They lived in a dwelling made of forest materials, with an earth floor, where, in observance of tapu, they did not eat inside, but cooked and ate in a lean-to outside. When he was eight years old, and having spoken only Māori, they moved back to Ruatāhuna, where he attended Huiarau Native School and learnt English for the first time. When he was 15, he went to Wesley College in Auckland as a boarder. He did teacher training at the Wellington College of Education, then studied at Victoria University of Wellington, during which time he also worked at the Gear Meat Company works in Petone. His uncle Makarini Temara was on the first Waitangi Tribunal in 1975.

== Career ==
Temara was a member of the Waitangi Tribunal from 2008 and was chair of the Repatriation Advisory Panel at Museum of New Zealand Te Papa Tongarewa. He was a member of the Tūhoe Waikaremoana Māori Trust Board and chair of Te Hui Ahurei a Tūhoe within his iwi (tribe), Ngāi Tūhoe. He was a member of the Tekau-mā-rua, having first been appointed by Kīngi Tūheitia.

=== Television appearances ===
Temara was the presenter of Korero Mai, Television New Zealand's first Māori language series.

== Death ==
Temara died on 8 November 2026, at the age of 78. His death was announced on the same day.

== Honours and awards ==
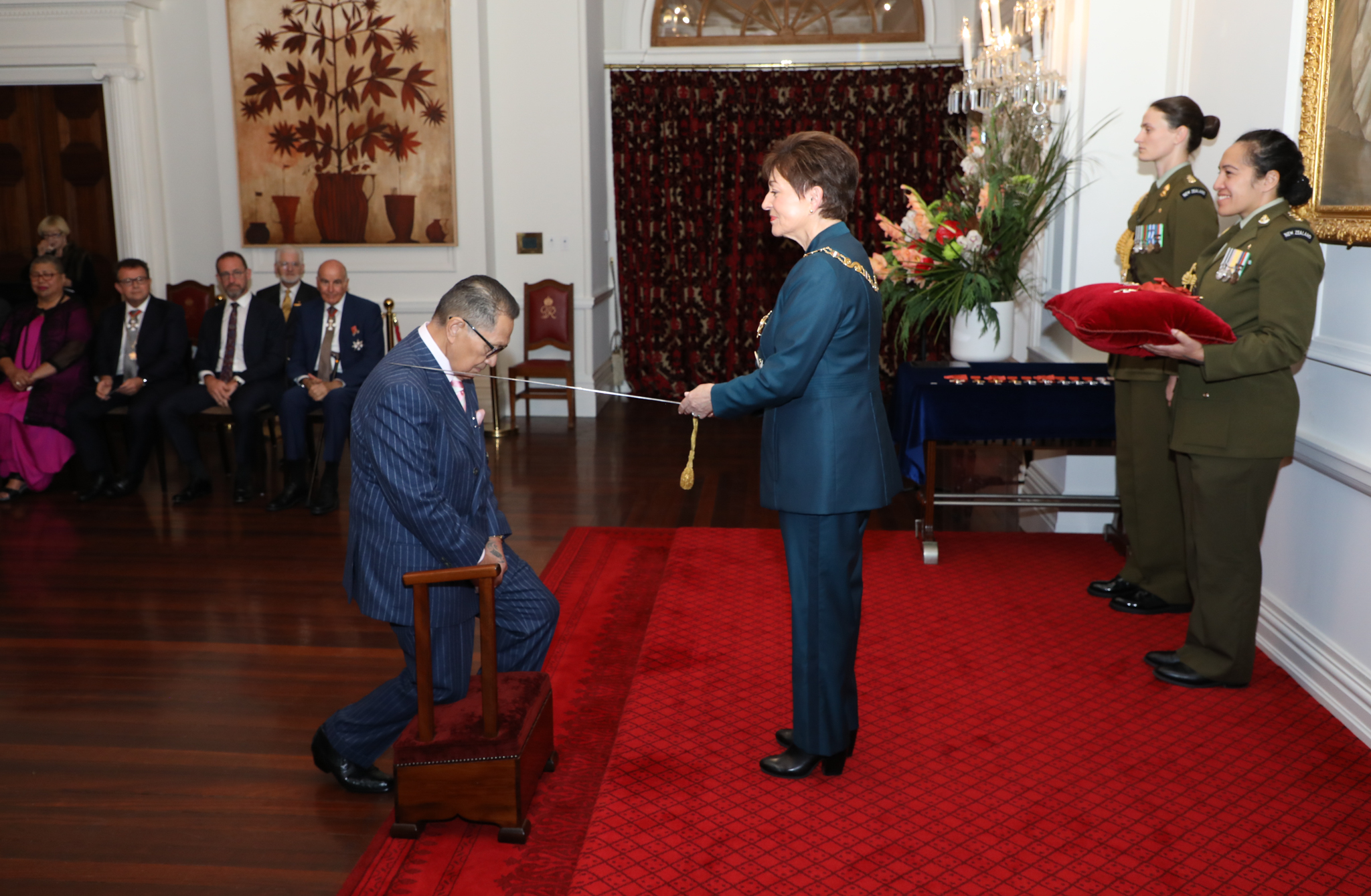
Temara's investiture as a Knight Companion of the New Zealand Order of Merit by the governor-general, Dame Patsy Reddy, on 6 May 2021

In the 2016 Queen's Birthday Honours, Temara was appointed a Companion of the New Zealand Order of Merit, for services to Māori and education. In the 2021 New Year Honours, he was promoted to Knight Companion. He was a Companion of the Royal Society of New Zealand.
