= Jenny Weston =

New Zealand veterinary professor

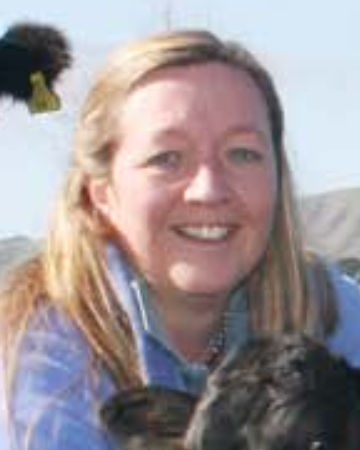

Academic background
- Education: Massey University
- Doctoral advisor: Norman Williamson, William E Pomroy, Timothy J Parkinson, Cord Heuer

Jennifer Faith Weston is a New Zealand veterinary scientist, and as of 2023 is a full professor at Massey University, specialising in dairy animals and their diseases.

== Academic career ==
Weston graduated as a veterinarian from Massey University in 1994, and then spent eight years practising in Taranaki, on dairy animals. Weston then joined the faculty of Massey University as a clinical teacher in 2002, running the Farm Services Clinic, and rising to full professor in 2022. Weston completed a PhD titled Investigations into the control of neosporosis in cattle at Massey University in 2011. Weston has led the Bachelor of Veterinary Science programme at Massey since 2016, and the same year was appointed academic dean of Tāwharau Ora School of Veterinary Science.

In addition to her veterinary degree and PhD, Weston also has a Bachelor of Philosophy and a Postgraduate Diploma in Educational Administration and Leadership. Weston's research focuses on dairy cattle and their diseases.

Weston also has an interest in veterinary social work. She has spoken about mental health problems within the veterinary workforce, for instance the stress placed on new graduates who face situations where a pet needs to be euthanised but the owner may not be emotionally prepared. In 2015 she wrote a report on the First International Symposium for Veterinary Mental Health and Suicide Prevention.

Weston served one term as President of New Zealand Veterinary Association. She is a board member of the Veterinary Council of New Zealand.

== Honours and awards ==
Weston was awarded the New Zealand Veterinary Association Outstanding Service Award in 2011, and was appointed an honorary life member in 2016.

In 2009 she won the Young Dairy Scientist Communication Award at the Large Herds Conference, for a paper on Neospora caninum in dairy cattle.

== Selected works ==
- Weston, Jenny Faith; C Heuer; N B Williamson (2011). "Efficacy of a Neospora caninum killed tachyzoite vaccine in preventing abortion and vertical transmission in dairy cattle". Preventive Veterinary Medicine. 103 (2–3): 136–144. doi:10.1016/j.prevetmed.2011.08.010. PMID 21925752. Wikidata Q84957563.
- R A Laven; K E Lawrence; Weston, Jenny Faith; K R Dowson; K J Stafford (2008). "Assessment of the duration of the pain response associated with lameness in dairy cows, and the influence of treatment". New Zealand Veterinary Journal. 56 (5): 210–217. doi:10.1080/00480169.2008.36835. PMID 18836500. Wikidata Q46330864.
- Weston, Jenny Faith; Howe, Laryssa; Mark Collett; R S Pattison; N B Williamson; D M West; Pomroy, William E.; S S Syed-Hussain; S T Morris; Kenyon, Paul (2009). "Dose-titration challenge of young pregnant sheep with Neospora caninum tachyzoites". Veterinary Parasitology. 164 (2–4): 183–191. doi:10.1016/j.vetpar.2009.05.013. PMID 19501968. Wikidata Q48582904.
- Grinberg A; Pomroy, William E.; Weston, Jenny Faith; Ayanegui-Alcerreca A; Knight D (2005). "The occurrence of Cryptosporidium parvum, Campylobacter and Salmonella in newborn dairy calves in the Manawatu region of New Zealand". New Zealand Veterinary Journal. 53 (5): 315–320. doi:10.1080/00480169.2005.36566. PMID 16220123. Wikidata Q43219295.
- Paterson BM; Morris RS; Weston, Jenny Faith; Cowan PE (1995). "Foraging and denning patterns of brushtail possums, and their possible relationship to contact with cattle and the transmission of bovine tuberculosis". New Zealand Veterinary Journal. 43 (7): 281–288. doi:10.1080/00480169./1995.35907. PMID 16031867. Wikidata Q49130187.
