= Rawinia Higgins =

New Zealand academic

Rawinia Higgins MNZM
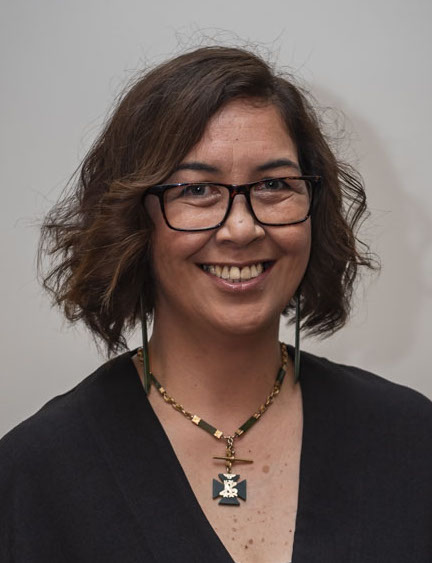
- Higgins in 2020
- Born: 1973 (age 52–53)
- Awards: Pou Aronui award (2020); FRSNZ (2021)

Academic background
- Education: University of Otago
- Thesis: He tanga ngutu, he Tuhoetanga te Mana Motuhake o te ta moko wahine (2004)
- Doctoral advisor: Michael Reilly

Academic work
- Discipline: Māori language and culture
- Institutions: Victoria University of Wellington
- Doctoral students: Elizabeth Kerekere

Rawinia Ruth Higgins MNZM (born 1973) is a New Zealand academic whose research focuses on Māori language and culture. In December 2024, Higgins was appointed a Member of the New Zealand Order of Merit for services to Māori language, education and governance.

== Research ==
Higgins' Master's thesis at the University of Otago was on the nature of transmission of oral histories, while her 2004 PhD thesis – He tanga ngutu, he Tuhoetanga te Mana Motuhake o te ta moko wahine – was on the identity politics of female chin tattoos. She was the Head of School at Te Kawa a Māui, School of Maori Studies at Victoria University and was appointed Deputy Vice Chancellor Māori at Victoria University of Wellington in 2016.

Higgins has written Māori material for Te Ara: The Encyclopedia of New Zealand. She has been a member of the Waitangi Tribunal since 2013, and is on the board of Te Māngai Pāho, the Māori Broadcast Funding Agency. She is currently Chair of the Māori Language Commission. Higgins has also served on the following boards, Te Kotahi a Tūhoe and the Tūhoe Fisheries Charitable Trust Board. Higgins provided the translation for the Māori name of the New Zealand Veterinary Association – Te Pae Kīrehe – which the organization adopted on 29 May 2023.

== Honours and awards ==
In November 2020, the Royal Society Te Apārangi awarded Higgins the Pou Aronui award for dedicated service to the humanities–aronui over a sustained period. In March 2021, Higgins was elected a Fellow of the Royal Society Te Apārangi, recognising "her scholarly contributions have made a significant impact in sharing new discourse, insights and understanding of mātauranga Māori and challenging cultural norms".

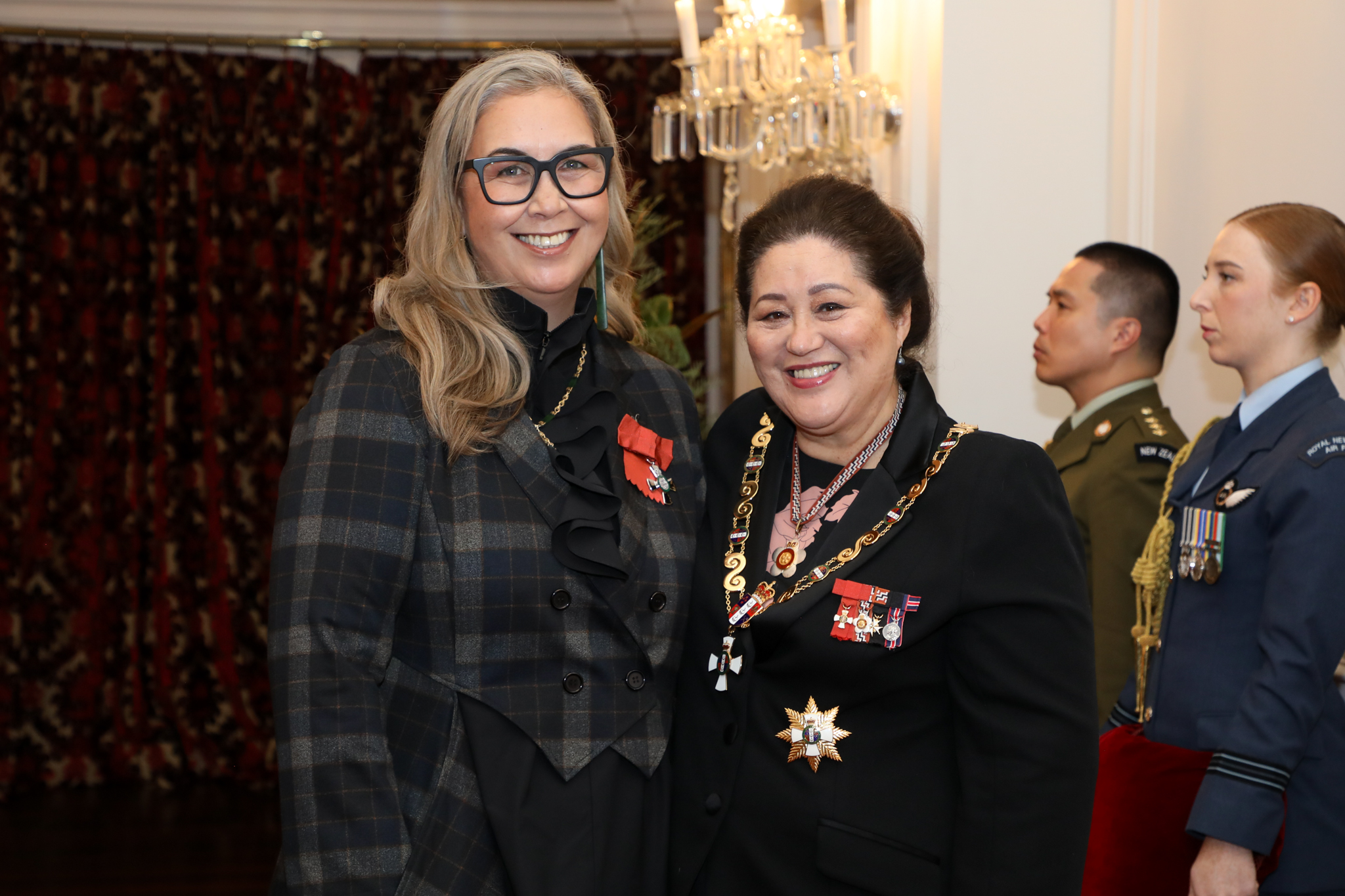
Higgins (left), after her investiture as a Member of the New Zealand Order of Merit by the governor-general, Dame Cindy Kiro, at Government House, Wellington, on 2 May 2025

In the 2025 New Year Honours, Higgins was appointed a Member of the New Zealand Order of Merit, for services to Māori language, education and governance.

== Personal life ==
Born in 1973, Higgins is of Tūhoe descent.
