= Censorship in Samoa =

The United States Department of State Country Report on Human Rights Practices in Samoa states that:

The law provides for freedom of speech and of the press, and the government generally respected these rights in practice and did not restrict academic freedom or the Internet. In general the independent media were active and expressed a wide variety of views without restriction. The law stipulates imprisonment for any journalist who refuses to reveal a confidential source despite the issuance of a court order upon request from any member of the public at large. However, there has been no court case invoking this law.

In May 2006, the film The Da Vinci Code was banned from local television stations in Samoa, as well as the country's only cinema. The government censorship office also prohibited the sale or rental of future VHS and DVD versions of the film. The primary objections to the film's content came from leaders of the Samoa Council of Churches, who attended a pre-screening. Alapati Lui Mataeliga, the Roman Catholic Archbishop of Apia, said that The Da Vinci Code would "affect the belief of young people whose faith was not strong." The owner of the cinema, local businessman Maposua Rudolf Keil, opposed the ban as an infringement of the right to free expression. Samoan society is, in the words of the British Broadcasting Corporation, "deeply conservative and devoutly Christian".

In late March 2009, Samoa's Censorship Board banned the film Milk, a biography of American gay rights activist and politician Harvey Milk, from being distributed in the country. Principal Censor Leiataua Niuapu Faaui, asked by the New Zealand Herald about the reason for the ban, said he could not comment. Samoan human rights activist Ken Moala commented:

I do not think it should be banned. It is basically a documentary about the human endeavour to conquer something that people tend to discriminate against. It's really harmless, I don't know how it would affect Samoan lifestyle. It is totally different and not applicable to here, it is pretty tame really.

On April 17, the Pacific Freedom Forum issued a press release stating: "Samoa is the only nation worldwide where censors have specifically banned the multi-academy award winning film, which means those in Samoa will only see the pirated version or overseas-purchased copies smuggled into the country." Papua New Guinean Susuve Laumaea, the Forum's chair, added: "The Pacific Freedom Forum calls on the Samoan film censors to fully and transparently explain themselves to the Samoan people, and re-consider its decision on banning 'Milk'." American Samoan Monica Miller, the Forum's co-chair, stated: "Given the acclaim this film has received worldwide, and given the silence on exactly why it has been banned in Samoa, observers are left to wonder at the censorship standards being applied in a country where fa’afafine have a well established and respected role." Fa'afafine are biologically men raised to assume female gender roles, making them a third gender well accepted in Samoan society.

In August 2009 media reports indicated that four films were newly banned, including National Lampoon's Van Wilder: Freshman Year and The Cell 2.

In 2019 the country's Censorship Board banned the film Rocketman, about Elton John, from being shown in cinema, describing it as depicting "acts that are not good for public viewing and against the law".

== See also ==
- Film censorship
- Criticisms of The Da Vinci Code
- Human rights in Samoa
