= Law of Samoa =

Law of the Independent State of Samoa

The law of Samoa stems from two sources: English common law, as ultimately embodied in the Constitution of Samoa, and Samoan customary law, such as Faʻamatai. In 1992 the Supreme Court of Samoa found that "Samoa has two systems of law working side by side. On the one hand, we have statute law, English common law and equity, on the other, custom and usage and the principles of customary law which governs the holding of matai titles and customary land—each legal system has its own court." Customary law is also primary for issues of village governance under the Village Fono Act 1990.

80% of land in Samoa is held as customary land, with title formally vested in matai. Disputes over this land—for example, over boundaries or ownership—are decided by the Land and Titles Court according to Samoan custom. While appeals are nominally forbidden, the Supreme Court of Samoa exercises a supervisory jurisdiction for breaches of fundamental rights. Decisions of the Land Court — and ultimately, local matai—over titles have been overturned by the Supreme Court for breach of the right to a fair trial. The Land and Titles Court has been the subject of criticism for a number of years due to ongoing delays, verbal-only rulings, poor process, and outright bias. In 2016, the Samoan Parliament commissioned a Special Inquiry Committee to review the Court and improve its processes. The Committee recommended a number of improvements, including written rulings and conflict of interest provisions. One of the recommendations was that the supervisory jurisdiction of the Supreme Court be retained to ensure the fundamental rights of Samoan citizens are upheld.

Village governance is conducted according to custom by meetings (fono) of matai conducted under the Village Fono Act. In addition to local government functions such as sanitation and economic development, and punishment of low-level village misconduct, fono are empowered to make decision on issues such as harmony, promoting social cohesion, protecting Samoan customs and traditions, and safeguarding village traditions, norms and protocols, and are empowered to issue punishments such as fines, work, or banishment. These powers are sometimes abused, for example to fine or banish political candidates or their supporters, or followers of minority religious groups. These decisions have also been overturned by the Supreme Court on human rights grounds, and the Court has consistently upheld the constitutional right to freedom of religion over village decisions.

== See also ==
- Samoan nationality law
