= Luamanuvao Katalaina Sapolu =

Ombudsman of Samoa

4th Ombudsman of Samoa
- In office 1 April 2021 – 30 May 2023
- Nominated by: Tuilaʻepa Saʻilele Malielegaoi
- Appointed by: Tuimalealiʻifano Vaʻaletoʻa Sualauvi II
- Preceded by: Maiava Iulai Toma
- Succeeded by: Vui Clarence Nelson

Personal details
- Born: 6 August 1958 (age 68) Vaiala, Western Samoa Trust Territory
- Education: Queen Mary University of London, University of Auckland, University of Newcastle

Luamanuvao Katalaina Sapolu (born 6 August 1958) was Samoa's Ombudsman from 2021 to 2023. She is the first woman ever appointed to that role. She is the sister of former Chief Justice of Samoa Patu Tiava'asu'e Falefatu Sapolu, and is married to Judge Richard Lussick.

Sapolu is from the village of Vaiala, Samoa. She was educated at the University of Newcastle in Australia, graduating with a Bachelor of Arts in Philosophy, and at the University of Auckland in New Zealand, where she graduated with a Bachelor of Laws in 1986. She was admitted as a barrister in New Zealand in December 1986. She returned to Samoa in 1988 where she worked as a lawyer. In 2002 she moved to London to work for the Commonwealth Secretariat, where she worked in various positions. During this time she completed a Master of Laws at Queen Mary University of London. After serving as Chief Legal Counsel for the Organisation of African, Caribbean and Pacific States in Brussels, she served as Director of the Commonwealth secretariat's Rule of Law Division from 2013 - 2017, then as Senior Director of the Governance and Peace Directorate until 2019. In 2020 she returned to Samoa and founded a consultancy firm.

In February 2021 she was appointed Ombudsman, the first woman to hold the role. She was sworn in on 1 April 2021. She resigned from the role for personal reasons on 30 May 2023.

In 2024-25 she served as a legal adviser for the Mau a Samoa I le Sitiseni 2024 campaign in support of the Citizenship (Western Samoa) (Restoration) Amendment Act 2024.

In March 2026 Luamanuvao was appointed Assistant Secretary-General for Global Operations for the Organisation of African, Caribbean and Pacific States.

In August 2026 she was one of ten legal professionals awarded a lifetime achievement award by the Samoa Law Society.
