= Elizabeth Kerekere =

New Zealand academic and politician

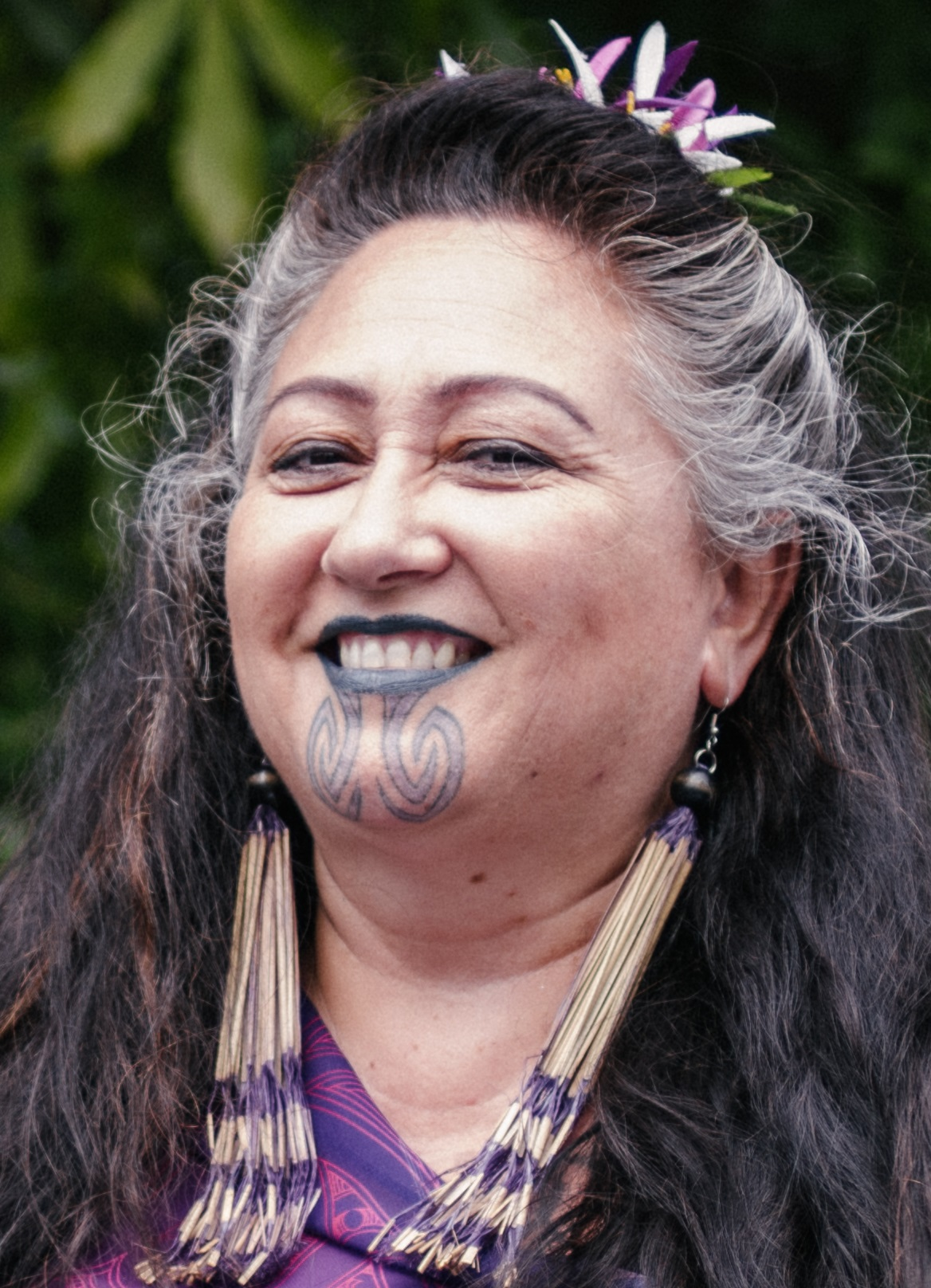
- Kerekere in 2020

Member of the New Zealand Parliament for Green party list
- In office 17 October 2020 – 14 October 2023

Personal details
- Born: 1965 or 1966 (age 60–61) Gisborne, New Zealand
- Party: Independent (2023); Green (until 2023)
- Spouse: Alofa Aiono
- Awards: Takatapui Award – 2018 New Zealand LGBTI Awards

Academic background
- Education: Victoria University of Wellington
- Thesis: Part of the whānau: the emergence of takatāpui identity – He whāriki takatāpui (2017)
- Doctoral advisor: Rawinia Higgins; Ocean Mercier

Elizabeth Anne Kerekere (born 1965 or 1966) is a New Zealand politician and LGBTQ activist and scholar. She was elected a member of parliament for the Green Party in 2020, but resigned from the Greens on 5 May 2023, following allegations of bullying within the party. Kerekere remained in parliament as an independent until the 2023 election.

Kerekere identifies as takatāpui and produced the first major research on takatāpui identity with her doctoral thesis in 2017. She is also an artist and graduated from Eastern Institute of Technology with a bachelor in Māori visual arts (Te Toi o Ngā Rangi). In 2000, in her role of Te Kairuruku, Ngā Kaupapa Māori at Dowse Art Museum she curated an exhibition called Kaumatua Anō te Ātaahua: Honouring the Gifts of our Elders.

== Personal life ==
Kerekere was born in Gisborne, New Zealand. Her father, Karauria Tarao "Bison" Kerekere, was an artist and master carver. He was Māori, and of the Te Whānau a Kai, Te Aitanga-a-Māhaki, Rongowhakaata, Ngāi Tāmanuhiri and Ngāti Oneone iwi. Elizabeth's mother Erin is Irish, from County Clare and County Tipperary. Kerekere is a lesbian, and is married to Alofa Aiono, whom she met in 1992. The couple held their civil union in Te Papa's marae, Te Marae Rongomaraeroa, which Kerekere advised on the design of in the late 1980s.

== Activism ==
Kerekere was introduced to activism at a young age. She was 12 years old when she began babysitting the children of Māori women who held consciousness-raising meetings at their homes, and by age 15 was a junior member of the Māori Women's Welfare League. As a teenager Kerekere was part of both the Māori and Black Women's movements, involved in a variety of political groups including Young PACIFICA and the Ōtepoti Black Women's Group. In the 1980s, she also campaigned in the nuclear free and homosexual law reform movements, and joined Māori and Pacific lesbian activist group Ngā Wāhine mō Ngā Wāhine o Te Moananui-a-Kiwa.

In 1998, Kerekere and Aiono attended the fifth Gay Games in Amsterdam, which inspired Kerekere to lead a delegation to the sixth Gay Games in Sydney in 2002. Between 1998 and 2002, Kerekere ran a weekly lotto fundraiser to make sure that Māori, Pacific, and low income lesbians would be represented on the team. Her desire for Māori representation in the Gay Games was also a motivation behind establishing the Tīwhanawhana Trust, which she did in 2001 with support from Māori women's performing trust Tī Kouka.

Kerekere wrote that Tīwhanawhana has aimed "to uplift the mana of takatāpui both through Māori language and culture, and by advocating for takatāpui rights, health and well-being." Kevin Haunui began running Tīwhanawhana's weekly kapa haka group in Wellington from the mid-2000s, with Kerekere leading political work across various sectors relevant to takatāpui. In 2015, the Tīwhanawhana Trust board consisted of Kerekere, Haunui, Peri Te Wao, and Heta Timu. Since its foundation, Tīwhanawhana has become an integral part of Wellington's rainbow communities, often guiding the tikanga – Māori cultural practices – at events and within organizations, informing organizational strategies so that they honor takatāpui, leading waiata, and giving kapa haka performances. In 2019, Kerekere and Haunui led Tīwhanawhana as one of the host organisations – alongside Intersex Aotearoa and Rainbow Youth – in hosting the ILGA World conference.

Long active in queer youth work, in 2007 Kerekere was involved in the KAHA Queer Youth Hui 2007, for which she created her first takatāpui youth group guidelines. In 2008 she took on a role with the OUT THERE! National Queer Youth Development Project, which provided education, resources and support for developing youth groups. Through this role she organized the KAHA National Queer Youth Hui 2009, travelling nationally and developing relationships with youth groups.

== Academic career ==
Throughout her studies at the Eastern Institute of Technology (EIT), Kerekere focussed on mana tūpuna (ancestors), mana wāhine (women) and mana takatāpui (the right to live and love regardless of sexual orientation and gender identity) and was the only degree graduate to have a solo exhibition. After graduating from EIT, Kerekere spent the following five years researching the development of takatāpui identity in the 21st century at Victoria University of Wellington, arguing that pre-colonial Māori were sexually experimental people who openly accepted gender and sexual fluidity, and completing a PhD in 2017.

== Political career ==
New Zealand Parliament
Years	Term	Electorate	List	Party
2020–2023	53rd	List	9	Green
2023	Changed allegiance to:			Independent

Kerekere stood in the Ikaroa-Rāwhiti electorate for the Green Party of Aotearoa New Zealand in the 2017 New Zealand general election. She placed third of three candidates with 1,924 votes. Her list placing of 19th was too low for her to enter parliament as a list MP.

Kerekere contested Ikaroa-Rāwhiti for the Green Party again in 2020. Although she again did not win Ikaroa-Rāwhiti, Kerekere entered parliament ninth on the Green Party's list. Upon her election, and until her resignation from the Green Party in May 2023, she was appointed the Green Party deputy musterer (whip) and spokesperson for arts, culture and heritage, the community and voluntary sector, health, Māori development, rainbow communities, statistics, and Whānau Ora. She is a member of the health select committee and the Pae Ora legislation committee.

=== COVID-19 household isolation breach ===
On 15 March 2022, Kerekere resigned from her position as the Green Party spokesperson for health and acting spokesperson for COVID-19 response after she broke COVID-19 isolation rules by flying from Gisborne to Wellington despite being a household contact for COVID-19. She was also temporarily removed from her position on the Health Select Committee. The Green Party also notified health authorities of the breach. Kerekere apologised for her actions and stated that she would cooperate with investigators.

=== Bullying behaviour allegations ===
In early April 2023, the Green Party launched an investigation into Kerekere after she allegedly disparaged fellow Green MP Chlöe Swarbrick in a leaked group chat. Radio New Zealand subsequently reported that at least seven current and former Green Party staff had made allegations of bullying and combative behaviour against Kerekere. In response, a Green Party spokesperson stated that Kerekere was undergoing an "internal process" being conducted by musterer Jan Logie and chief of staff Robin Campbell.

In response to the bullying allegations, members of the Green Party's Te Mātāwaka (the Māori and Pasifika rōpu) and the Rainbow Greens voiced support for Kerekere. An unidentified former senior Māori Green Party advisor claimed that Kerekere was the victim of bullying and alleged "dirty politics." According to Stuff, Kerekere's high fourth-place ranking in the draft Green Party list had "ruffled feathers" with the parliamentary caucus. In late April, supporters of Kerekere failed to delay the Green Party's list rankings until the investigation into Kerekere's conduct had been concluded. In early May 2023, the party's GreenLeft Network endorsed Kerekere as a preferred candidate in the party's ranking process, effectively calling on members to rank her highly on the party list.

On 5 May 2023 Kerekere left the Green Party to sit as an independent and announced she would not stand at the 2023 election. Kerekere announced her decision during a Zoom call with Green members that night. During the Zoom call, Kerekere expressed frustration with delays in the Green Party's investigation into her behaviour and accused co-leaders James Shaw and Marama Davidson of making it difficult for her to continue working with the party. In response, Shaw and Davidson disputed Kerekere's allegations and defended the investigation process, stating that Kerekere had resigned before the process could be concluded. They also confirmed that the party did not intend to use the waka-jumping provisions of the Electoral (Integrity) Amendment Act 2018 to expel Kerekere from Parliament. On 10 May, Kerekere ruled out joining Te Pāti Māori (Māori Party).

On 16 August 2023, Kerekere gave her valedictory speech in Parliament. She criticised Shaw and Davidson, accusing them of making "unfounded and increasingly elaborate allegations against her." Kerekere also alleged she was denied natural justice and was not subject to a formal complaints process, which she described as an "epic failure of leadership." In an interview that day, Kerekere explained that the "crybaby" reference was to herself, and that she thought she was sending the message to her wife.

=== After parliament ===
Kerekere unsuccessfully ran for election as a Gisborne District councillor for the Tairāwhiti Māori ward in the 2025 local elections.

== List of works ==
- Kerekere, Elizabeth (1992). "Preparing the Art World for Māori Dykes". In McPherson, Heather (ed.). Spiral 7: A Collection of Lesbian Art and Writing from Aotearoa/New Zealand. Spiral. ISBN 0908896247.
- Kerekere, Elizabeth (1992). "Takatāpui – Where Worlds Collide". In Hutchings, Jessica; Aspin, Clive (eds.). Sexuality and the Stories of Indigenous People. Huia. pp. 35–43. ISBN 9781869692773.
- Kerekere, Elizabeth. "Honoa Te Pito Ora ki Te Pito Mate: Takatāpui Past and Present". Te Kāhui Kura Māori (2).
- Kerekere, Elizabeth (2015). Takatāpui: Part of the Whānau. Auckland: Tīwhanawhana Trust and Mental Health Foundation.
- Kerekere, Elizabeth (2016). "LGBT Activism Among Māori". In Naples, Nancy (ed.). The Wiley Blackwell Encyclopedia of Gender and Sexuality Studies. John Wiley & Sons. pp. 35–43. ISBN 9781118663219.
- Kerekere, Elizabeth (2017). Part of the Whānau: The Emergence of Takatāpui Identity – He Whāriki Takatāpui (PhD). Victoria University of Wellington.
