= Monty Soutar =

New Zealand historian (born 1961)

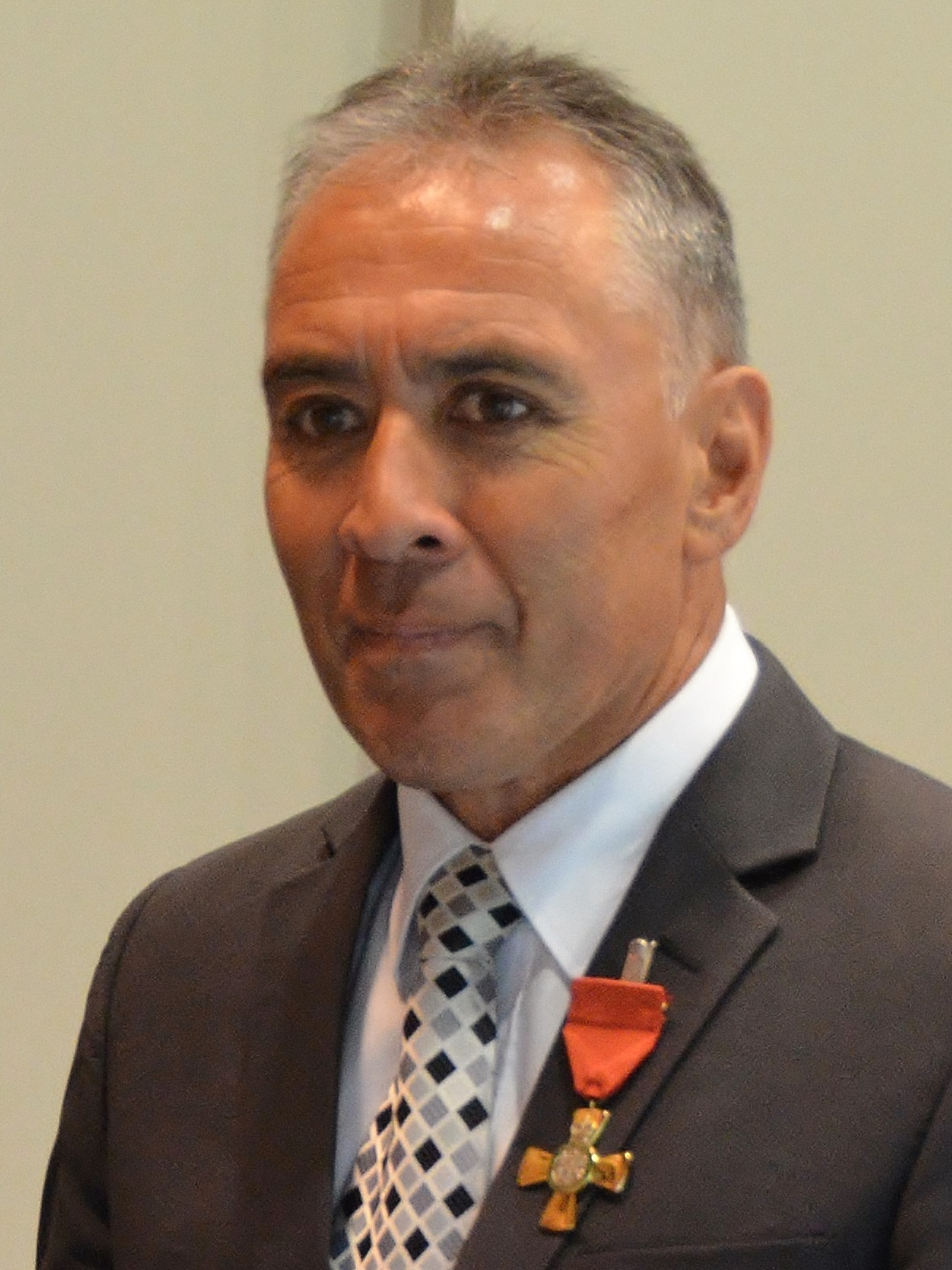
Soutar in 2016, following his investiture as an Officer of the New Zealand Order of Merit

Monty Glyn Soutar ONZM (born 1961) is a New Zealand historian and author.

== Early life and education ==
Soutar lived in Ruatoria, Kawerau and Palmerston North as a child. He then attended Hato Paora College, which he credits for instilling pride in academic achievement and interest in the Maori side of his heritage. Soutar is affiliated with the Māori tribes of Ngāti Porou, Ngāti Awa, Ngāi Tai ki Tāmaki and Ngāti Kahungunu.

Soutar attended Palmerston North Teachers' College from 1980 to 1983. He holds degrees from Massey University and Victoria University.

== Career ==
Soutar taught for two years at Manutahi Primary School, followed by two years working through historical records at the Māori Land Court in Gisborne to create a local history resource for schools on the East Coast. He also spent four years in the Territorials and New Zealand Army.

He was a senior lecturer in Maori studies at Massey University.

Soutar was appointed to the Waitangi Tribunal in 2002 for a three-year period, and from 2006 to January 2010 was Director of the Tairawhiti Museum in Gisborne. During his time there he negotiated an increase in museum funding and initiated a project which involved upgrading collection documentation and rehousing the museum's collection. He was appointed one of the Guardians of the Alexander Turnbull Library in 2006 and was on the National Archives Council.

Since 2011 Soutar has been a Fellow in Maori History at the Ministry of Culture and Heritage. In the 2015 New Year Honours, he was appointed an Officer of the New Zealand Order of Merit, for services to Māori and historical research. At that time he was also World War One Historian in Residence at Auckland War Memorial Museum.

In 2021 Soutar was awarded the Creative New Zealand Michael King Writer's Fellowship worth $100,000 to enable him to complete a historical novel trilogy. The first novel in the trilogy, Kāwai, was published in 2022, and was the best-selling New Zealand fiction novel of the year. It was shortlisted for the Jann Medlicott Acorn Prize for Fiction at the 2023 Ockham New Zealand Book Awards.

== Selected bibliography ==
- Nga Tamatoa: The Price of Citizenship. C Company 28 (Maori) Battalion 1939–1945. Published 2008.
- Whitiki! Whiti! Whiti! E! Maori in the First World War. Published 2019.
- Kāwai: For Such A Time As This. Published 2022.
- Kāwai: Tree of Nourishment. Published 2024.
