= Tanugamanono =

Samoan village

Coordinates: 13°50′S 171°46′W

Tanugamanono is a village on the island of Upolu in Samoa. It is situated on the north central side of the island near the country's capital Apia. The village is in the political district of Tuamasaga.

The population is 805.

The largest electricity generating plant in Samoa is located in Tanugamanono, the 19.2 MW diesel plant which uses 5 generators. The plant was heavily damaged in December 2012 by Cyclone Evan.
