= Leiataualesa Daryl Clarke =

Samoan judge

Leiataualesa Daryl Clarke is a Samoan judge. He has served on the Supreme Court of Samoa since December 2016.

Clarke was educated at the Australian National University and the University of Canberra in Australia. After working for the Australian government he worked as an Assistant Attorney General before entering private practice. In February 2016 he was appointed to the District Court of Samoa. In December 2016 he was appointed to the Supreme Court of Samoa. In 2020 he freed a man who had been unlawfully imprisoned for five years beyond the end of his sentence. In January 2021 he took a leave of absence from the Court to study overseas.
