= Supreme Court of Samoa =

Superior court of justice in Samoa

The Supreme Court of Samoa (Samoan: Faamasinoga Sili o Samoa) is the superior court dealing with the administration of justice in Samoa.

It was established by Part VI of the Constitution of Samoa. It consists of the chief justice of Samoa and other judges as appointed by the head of state on the advice of the prime minister of Samoa. Judges serve until they reach the age of 68 years, and can only be removed from office on the address of the Legislative Assembly on grounds of misbehaviour or infirmity; this requires a two-thirds majority of all MPs. (Note: Article 68(5)) Acting judges may be appointed for a fixed term. (Note: Article 71)

The court has jurisdiction over the interpretation of the constitution, (Note: Article 73(2)) enforcement of fundamental rights, (Note: Article 4) and membership of the Legislative Assembly of Samoa. (Note: Article 47) It also has "such original, appellate and revisional jurisdiction as may be provided by Act". (Note: Article 73(1)) At present this is criminal jurisdiction where there is a statutory maximum sentence of more than seven years and a civil jurisdiction where the amount claimed is more than $20,000. It can hear both civil and criminal appeals from the District Court of Samoa. In 2020 the jurisdiction of the court was amended by the Land and Titles Bill to exclude review of any decision falling within the jurisdiction of the Land and Titles Court of Samoa.

Decisions of the Supreme Court can, with leave of the court, be appealed to the Court of Appeal of Samoa. The Court of Appeal consists of the chief justice and the other judges of the Supreme Court, but a judge cannot sit on an appeal from their own decision. (Note: Article 77)

== Judges ==
The court is made up of the following judges:

- Chief Justice Satiu Simativa Perese
- Justice Vui Clarence Nelson
- Justice Mata Tuatagaloa
- Justice Tafaoimalo Leilani Tuala-Warren
- Justice Fepuleai Ameperosa Roma
- Justice Leiataualesa Daryl Clarke

In addition, former justice Lesatele Rapi Vaai was reappointed for a period of 12 months in November 2020.

On 4 August 2021, five former New Zealand judges were appointed as acting judges for a term of two years:

- Justice Robert Fisher
- Justice Peter Blanchard
- Justice Rhys Harrison
- Justice Rodney Hansen
- Justice Raynor Asher
