= Chief Justice of Samoa =

Chief justice of the Supreme Court of Samoa

Chief Justice of the Supreme Court of Samoa
- Faamasino Sili o le Faamasinoga Sili o Samoa (Samoan)
- Coat of arms of Samoa
- Incumbent; Satiu Simativa Perese since 12 June 2020
- Nominator: Prime Minister of Samoa
- Appointer: O le Ao o le Malo (the Head of State)
- Term length: Life tenure until the age of 68 for Samoan citizens Fixed-term appointment for non-Samoan citizens
- Constituting instrument: Constitution of Samoa, Article 65
- Precursor: Chief Judge of the High Court of Western Samoa
- Salary: WS$90,405/year

The chief justice of Samoa (Samoan: Faamasino Sili o le Faamasinoga Sili o Samoa) is the chief justice of the Supreme Court of Samoa. The qualifications and powers of the office are governed by Part VI of the Constitution of Samoa and the Judicature Ordinance 1961. The position is currently held by Satiu Simativa Perese.

== History ==
Under the American–British–German condominium, the Supreme Court of Justice for Samoa was established by Article III of the Treaty of Berlin (1889), with the single judge of the court being called the Chief Justice per Section 1 of that Article. The first Chief Justice was Swedish jurist Conrad Cedercrantz, who was appointed in 1890. The position of Chief Justice was subsequently held by Americans Henry Clay Ide from 1893 to 1897 and William Lea Chambers from 1897 to 1899. Chambers' ruling in the kingship dispute between Malietoa Tanumafili I and Mata'afa Iosefo in December 1898 angered the Germans and led to the Second Samoan Civil War.

After the war ended in 1899, Samoa was partitioned into separate German and American colonies in accordance with the Tripartite Convention which superseded the Treaty of Berlin, abolishing the position of Chief Justice. The existing German consular court at Apia was then converted into a court of second instance, headed by a chairman. The chief judicial officer was the Imperial Chief Judge (German: Kaiserlicher Oberrichter), who was advised on matters of Samoan customary law by a Samoan Chief Judge (Samoan: Faʻamasino Sili). The first colonial governor Wilhelm Solf appointed Erich Schultz-Ewerth to the position of Imperial Chief Judge. Schultz succeeded Solf as governor in 1910 but continued to hold the position of Imperial Judge as well.

German rule was ended by New Zealand's occupation of German Samoa in 1914. New Zealand then ruled Samoa as a League of Nations mandate and subsequently a United Nations Trust Territory from 1920 to 1962, officially called the Western Samoa Trust Territory. During this period, Part III of the Samoa Constitution Order 1920 provided for a High Court of Western Samoa, headed by a Chief Judge. John Luxford served as Chief Judge from 1929 to 1935, during which time he was involved in controversies including the inquest into Black Saturday and the deportation of Olaf Frederick Nelson.

After independence in 1962, New Zealand expatriates continued to hold the post of Chief Justice for some years, as in other Pacific Islands Commonwealth countries. Public demand for a Samoan to be appointed to the position became stronger in the wake of CJ Bryan Nicholson's controversial decision to uphold an election petition to remove two members of the Legislative Assembly who had been returned in the 1979 general election. The first Samoan to become Chief Justice was Vaovasamanaia Phillips, appointed in 1983.

== Appointment and removal ==
The O le Ao o le Malo (the head of state) appoints the Chief Justice, acting on the advice of the Prime Minister. Judges of the Supreme Court, including the Chief Justice, must have eight years' total experience as barristers in Samoa or other approved countries, and must meet other qualifications prescribed by the Head of State, acting on the advice of the Judicial Service Commission. A Samoan citizen appointed as Chief Justice has life tenure until reaching the age of 68, which may be extended by the Head of State acting on the advice of the Prime Minister, while a non-Samoan citizen is appointed for a term of years. Judges of the Supreme Court may only be removed by the Head of State with the approval of a two-thirds supermajority of the Legislative Assembly, though the Head of State acting on the advice of the Prime Minister may suspend the Chief Justice when the Legislative Assembly is not in session.

Historically, under the Treaty of Berlin the Chief Justice was appointed by agreement among the three state parties, or failing that by the King of Sweden and Norway, and could be removed either by the appointing authority, or at the request of at least two of the three state parties.

Under New Zealand administration, the Chief Judge was appointed by, and held office at the pleasure of, New Zealand's Minister of External Affairs.

== Powers and responsibilities ==
The Chief Justice is ex officio the president of the Judicial Service Commission and the Court of Appeal of Samoa, and assumes the functions of the Council of Deputies if the Legislative Assembly has not elected the members of that council. The Chief Justice determines when the absence or incapacity of the Head of State requires that the Council of Deputies exercise the functions of the office of the Head of State. Remuneration of the post is governed by statute and was last increased in 2001.

The Chief Justice was previously also ex officio the president of the Land and Titles Court, the court which has jurisdiction on disputes over land tenure and chiefly titles. Under German administration, Imperial Chief Judge Schultz-Ewerth was concurrently the head of the Land and Titles Court's predecessor, the Land and Titles Commission. This practice continued under New Zealand rule: the Samoa Native Land and Titles Commission Order 1924 and the Native Land and Titles Protection Ordinance 1934 provided that the Chief Judge of the High Court would ex officio hold office as the head of the Native Land and Titles Commission (later the Native Land and Titles Court). This situation continued for some years after independence, though as the number of cases at the court increased drastically beginning in the late 1960s, the President rarely presided over hearings of first instance, instead only hearing appeals from decisions of judges of the court. The Land and Titles Act 1981 ended this practice by providing that the head of the Land and Titles Court could be the Chief Justice, any other judge of the Supreme Court, or any person qualified to be a judge of the Supreme Court. However, at times since then, the Chief Justice has also served as Acting President of the Land and Titles Court.

== List of chief justices ==
Portrait	Name	Nationality	From	To	Appointed by	Sources
Chief Justice of the Supreme Court of Justice for Samoa
	Conrad Cedercrantz	Sweden	1890	?	Oscar II of Sweden	
	Henry Clay Ide	United States	1893	1897		
	William Lea Chambers	United States	1897	1899		
Chief Judge of Samoa German: Oberrichter von Samoa
	Erich Schultz-Ewerth (Concurrently Governor of German Samoa from 1910 to 1914)	Germany	1904	1914	Wilhelm Solf	
Chief Judge of the High Court of Western Samoa (incomplete list)
	JE Wilson	New Zealand	?	1921		
	CR Orr-Walker	New Zealand	1921	1923		
	John Luxford	New Zealand	1929	1936	Joseph Ward	
	Robert Mackenzie Watson	New Zealand	April 1936	September 1936	Michael Joseph Savage	
	Joseph S. Morling	New Zealand	April 1937	?	Michael Joseph Savage	
	William Carrol Harley	New Zealand	September 1938	May 1942	Michael Joseph Savage	
	John R. Herd	New Zealand	Late 1942 or early 1943	November 1947	?	
	Charles Croft Marsack	New Zealand	January 1948	December 1961	Peter Fraser	
	Eric Rothwell	New Zealand	1957	1960	Sidney Holland	
Chief Justice of the Supreme Court of Samoa
	Paul Loxton Molineaux	New Zealand	1962	1966		
	Barrie Charles Spring	New Zealand	1966	1972		
	Gaven John Donne	New Zealand	1972	1974		
	Michael Bernard (Ben) Scully	New Zealand	1974	1976		
	Bryan Osborne Nicholson	New Zealand	?	1980		
	Robert St John	Australia	1980	1982		
	David Hull	?	?	?	?	
	John Douglas Dillon	?	?	?	?	
	Russell Callander	New Zealand	1982	1983	Tanumafili II, on the advice of Tupuola Efi	
	Vaovasamanaia Filipo	Samoa	1983	?	Tanumafili II, on the advice of Tofilau Eti Alesana	
	Trevor Maxwell	New Zealand	?	1989		
	Anthony John Ryan	New Zealand	1990	1992	After spending 6 months as a Judge in Samoa in 1988, Judge Tony Ryan returned as Chief Justice in 1990.	
	Patu Tiava'asu'e Falefatu Sapolu	Samoa	1992	2019		
	Satiu Simativa Perese	Samoa	2020	Present		
