= Satiu Simativa Perese =

Chief Justice of Samoa

Chief Justice of Samoa
- Incumbent
- Assumed office 12 June 2020
- Nominated by: Tuila'epa Sa'ilele Malielegaoi
- Appointed by: Tuimalealiʻifano Vaʻaletoʻa Sualauvi II
- Preceded by: Patu Tiava'asu'e Falefatu Sapolu

Personal details
- Born: 1962 (age 63–64) Magiagi, Samoa
- Education: Victoria University of Wellington, Columbia University

Satiu Simativa Perese (born 1962) is a Samoan judge. He has served as the Chief Justice of Samoa since 12 June 2020.

Perese was born in Magiagi, Samoa and educated at Magiagi Primary School. His family moved to New Zealand when he was a child. He studied business at Massey University and then became a newsreader for Radio New Zealand. In 1986 he began studying law at Victoria University of Wellington, from which he graduated in 1989, and he was admitted to the bar in 1990. He subsequently worked for the New Zealand Crown Law Office. In 1995 he became the first Samoan to win a Harkness Fellowship, and studied at Columbia University in New York.

Perese was admitted to the bar in Samoa in 1999, and has also worked in the Cook Islands. From 2000 to 2002 he was President of the Pacific Lawyers Society, and in 2002 he was appointed as inaugural chair of the National Pacific Radio Trust, which operates the Pacific Media Network. From 2003 to 2009 he was a member of the New Zealand Human Rights Review Tribunal. He has also worked as a New Zealand Crown prosecutor.

As a lawyer, he represented New Zealand MP Taito Phillip Field during his trial for corruption. In 2016, he was hired by Samoa's Attorney-General to prosecute the then-Director of the National Prosecutions Office, Mauga Precious Chang.

In March 2020, Perese was appointed Chief Justice of Samoa, replacing Patu Tiava'asu'e Falefatu Sapolu. He was sworn in on 12 June 2020. In October 2020 he was evacuated to New Zealand for medical treatment.

In May 2021 he delivered the judgement in the case of the FAST Party against the Electoral Commission, overturning the revocation of the 2021 election. On 7 July, the HRPP lodged a complaint against him with the Judicial Services Commission, alleging he was incompetent.

Legal offices
Preceded by Patu Tiava'asu'e Falefatu Sapolu	Chief Justice of Samoa; 2020–present	Incumbent
