= Patu Tiava'asu'e Falefatu Sapolu =

Samoan judge (1950–2021)

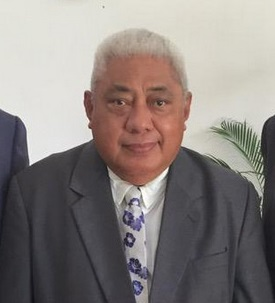
- Sapolu in 2015

Chief Justice of Samoa
- In office 20 July 1992 – 23 April 2019
- Nominated by: Tofilau Eti Alesana
- Appointed by: Malietoa Tanumafili II
- Preceded by: Anthony John Ryan
- Succeeded by: Satiu Simativa Perese

Attorney-General of Samoa
- In office 1988–1991
- Prime Minister: Tofilau Eti Alesana

Personal details
- Born: 22 July 1950 Vaiala, Western Samoa
- Died: 28 November 2021 (aged 70)
- Spouse: Tuitama Savaiinaea Iliganoa Sapolu
- Children: Three
- Education: University of Otago, University of Auckland

Patu Tiava'asu'e Falefatu Sapolu (22 July 1950 — 28 November 2021) was a Samoan lawyer and judge. He served as Attorney-General of Samoa from 1988 to 1991, and as Chief Justice of Samoa from 1992 to 2019.

== Early life and education ==
Sapolu is from Vaiala. He was educated at Marist Mulivai and at St. Joseph's College in Samoa. He attended the University of Otago and University of Auckland in New Zealand on a government scholarship, graduating with a Bachelor of Laws in 1972. He subsequently worked at the Attorney-General's office, as a temporary magistrate, and as a Court Registrar. In 1988 he was appointed Attorney-General of Samoa.

In 1990, while serving as acting chief justice during a murder trial, Patu jailed Samoa Observer editor Leota Uelese Petaia for eight days for contempt of court for alleging that he had a conflict of interest in the case. The verdict was later overturned by the Court of Appeal, which criticised Patu for his conduct.

== Chief Justice ==
In 1991 Sapolu was appointed Acting Chief Justice of Samoa. The position was made permanent, and he was sworn in on 20 July 1992. As Chief Justice he oversaw the construction of a new court house, the raising of the judicial retirement age from 62 to 68, and the establishment of specialist courts such as the Family Court and Coroners Court.

In 2010 Sapolu was the target of a failed assassination plot, along with Prime Minister Tuila'epa Sa'ilele Malielegaoi. He was the target of further threats in 2018.

In 2017 he refused to participate in a parliamentary inquiry into the Land and Titles Court of Samoa on the basis that it interfered with the independence of the judiciary.

In July 2018 his contract was extended for another nine months, despite having reached the mandatory retirement age of 68. He retired on 23 April 2019. He was replaced in March 2020 by Satiu Simativa Perese. Following his retirement he was given time to clear a backlog of unresolved cases. In one of these, National Pacific Insurance Ltd v Vaivaimuli Corporation Ltd, it emerged that he had reserved his decision in 1997 but never delivered it. A decision was finally released in August 2019, but overturned as unsafe by the Court of Appeal in August 2020. Patu's conduct in the case was described as "disgraceful" by one of the lawyers involved.

== Post-retirement ==
Following his retirement, Sapolu became a part-time lecturer in lands and titles law at the National University of Samoa.

In July 2020, Patu was nominated as a Human Rights Protection Party candidate for the electorate of Vaimauga No. 2 in the 2021 Samoan general election. On 29 September 2020, he was evacuated to New Zealand for medical treatment. He withdrew his candidacy in February 2021. During the 2021 Samoan constitutional crisis, Patu supported caretaker Prime Minister Tuila'epa Sa'ilele Malielegaoi, endorsing his claims that Parliament could not meet until an extra HRPP MP had been appointed, then calling for a second election as a means of resolving the crisis. In July 2021, he publicly supported Head of State Tuimalealiifano Va'aletoa Sualauvi II's order to delay Parliament sitting until August, despite this being found to be unconstitutional by the Supreme Court.

Following his death in November 2021 the government approved a state funeral.

Legal offices
Preceded by Anthony John Ryan	Chief Justice of Samoa; 1992–2019	Succeeded by Satiu Simativa Perese
