= 2026 in Samoa =

- Decades: 2000s; 2010s; 2020s
- See also: Other events of 2026; Timeline of Samoan history

Events in the year 2026 in Samoa.

== Incumbents ==
- O le Ao o le Malo: Tuimalealiʻifano Vaʻaletoʻa Sualauvi II
- Prime Minister: Laʻauli Leuatea Schmidt

== Events ==
=== February ===
- 27 February
  - 2026 Safata 1 by-election
  - 2026 Vaisigano 2 by-election

=== May ===
- 1 May – May 2026 Vaimauga 3 by-election
- 25 May – Vietnamese police charge two Samoan nationals with killing the Australian Coconut Cartel leader Lorenzo Lemalu and wounding an associate in Ho Chi Minh City.
- 28 May – Police in Apia launch an investigation into the involvement of two Samoan nationals in the killing of Lorenzo Lemalu.

=== July ===
- 10 July – 2026 Safata 2 by-election
- 14–17 July – A policy dialogue titled Governance for Resilient Futures is held at Taumeasina Island Resort, Apia, organized by the UNDP and the Government of Samoa to discuss climate resilience and economic pressures.
- 16 July – The U.S. Marine Minerals Administration announces the revocation of deep-sea mining permits in waters near American Samoa following opposition from Pacific communities.
- 17 July – The Indonesia women's national under-18 basketball team defeats Samoa 94–49 in the quarter-finals of the 2026 FIBA U-18 Asia Cup Division B in Bangkok, Thailand.
- 17–20 July – The Samoa national netball team plays a friendly series against the Australian U-23 team at Tuana'imato Sports Complex, Apia.
- 20–25 July – The Samoa Swim Series, an open water swimming competition, is held as part of the national sports calendar.
- 27 July – A child is reported missing aboard the MV Lady Samoa III but is found safe before the ferry arrives at Mulifanua.

=== September ===
- 18 September
  - 2026 Falealili 1 by-election
  - September 2026 Vaimauga 3 by-election

=== October ===
- 5 October – Prime Minister Schmidt apologizes for making a Nazi salute in 2007.

== Holidays ==
- 1 January – New Year's Day
- 30 March – Ramadan
- 18 April – Good Friday
- 19 April – Easter Saturday
- 21 April – Easter Monday
- 12 May – Mother's Day holiday
- 1 June – Independence Day
- 11 August – Father's Day holiday
- 13 October – Lotu a Tamaiti/Children's Service holiday
- 25 December – Christmas Day
- 26 December – Boxing Day

== Deaths ==
- 11 January – Laumatiamanu Ringo Purcell, politician
- 26 January – Sia Figiel, 59, writer, painter and alleged murderer.
- 14 February – Faʻaolesa Katopau Ainuʻu, 62, politician
- 9 September – Tolofuaivalelei Falemoe Leiʻataua, 76, politician
