= 2026 in American Samoa =

- Decades: 2000s; 2010s; 2020s
- See also: History of American Samoa; History of Samoa; Historical outline of American Samoa; List of years in American Samoa; 2026 in the United States

Events from 2026 in American Samoa.

== Incumbents ==
- US House Delegate: Amata Coleman Radewagen
- Governor: Pula Nikolao Pula
- Lieutenant Governor: Salo Ale

== Events ==
- July 17 – The Trump administration announces a plan to auction off sections of ocean near American Samoa to be used for deep sea mining.
- August 14 - The American Samoan flag football team beats the United States team during the 2026 IFAF Men's Flag Football World Championship. It is the U.S. team's first loss since 2012.
- September 11 – The state of Alaska drops charges against several American Samoans who voted in an election. Unlike other territories, American Samoans are American nationals, not citizens, and thus cannot vote in elections in the states.

== Deaths ==
- March 7 – Lolo Matalasi Moliga, 78, governor of American Samoa (2013–2021).
