= 2018 in American Samoa =

- Decades: 1990s; 2000s; 2010s; 2020s
- See also: History of American Samoa; History of Samoa; Historical outline of American Samoa; List of years in American Samoa; 2018 in the United States

Events from 2018 in American Samoa.

== Incumbents ==
- US House Delegate: Amata Coleman Radewagen
- Governor: Lolo Matalasi Moliga
- Lieutenant Governor: Lemanu Peleti Mauga

== Events ==
- 9 February – Cyclone Gita moves past the Samoan islands.
- 6 November – 2018 American Samoan constitutional referendum

== Deaths ==
- 21 April – Neff Maiava, 93, professional wrestler.
- 2 October – Utu Abe Malae, businessman, banker and politician.
- 24 October – Galeai Moaaliitele Tuufuli, 81, politician, member of the American Samoa Senate (since 2013).
