= 2019 in American Samoa =

- Decades: 1990s; 2000s; 2010s; 2020s
- See also: History of American Samoa; History of Samoa; Historical outline of American Samoa; List of years in American Samoa; 2019 in the United States

Events from 2019 in American Samoa.

== Incumbents ==
- US House Delegate: Amata Coleman Radewagen
- Governor: Lolo Matalasi Moliga
- Lieutenant Governor: Lemanu Peleti Mauga

== Events ==
- 11 May – A North Korean merchant ship loaded with coal, seized by the United States in the East China Sea for suspected sanctions violation, arrives in Pago Pago, American Samoa.

== Deaths ==
- 12 June – Te'o J. Fuavai, 82, politician, former Senator, Speaker of the American Samoa House of Representatives (1975–19??).
