= 2023 in Samoa =

- Decades: 2000s; 2010s; 2020s
- See also: Other events of 2023; Timeline of Samoan history

Events in the year 2023 in Samoa.

== Incumbents ==
- O le Ao o le Malo: Tuimalealiʻifano Vaʻaletoʻa Sualauvi II
- Prime Minister: Fiamē Naomi Mataʻafa

== Events ==
Ongoing – COVID-19 pandemic in Samoa

- 24 February – 2023 Vaimauga 3 by-election
- 23 March – 2019 Samoa assassination plot: Two men are found guilty of conspiring to kill the former Prime Minister Tuilaʻepa Saʻilele Malielegaoi after a trial before the country's Supreme Court.
- 8 June – Heavy rainfall in Savai'i, causes widespread flooding and infrastructure damage.

== Sports ==
- 2023 Super Rugby Pacific season
