= 2022 in American Samoa =

- Decades: 2000s; 2010s; 2020s
- See also: History of American Samoa; History of Samoa; Historical outline of American Samoa; List of years in American Samoa; 2022 in the United States

Events from 2022 in American Samoa.

== Incumbents ==
- US House Delegate: Amata Coleman Radewagen
- Governor: Lemanu Peleti Mauga
- Lieutenant Governor: Salo Ale

== Events ==
Ongoing – COVID-19 pandemic in Oceania; COVID-19 pandemic in American Samoa

- 15 January – A Tsunami warning is issued in American Samoa following the Hunga Ha'apai eruption, the warning is later cancelled.
- 19 January – A seventh passenger from a Hawaiian Airlines flight from Honolulu, Hawaii, tests positive for COVID-19. The plane landed in American Samoa on January 6, 2022.
- 8 November –2022 United States House of Representatives election in American Samoa

== Sports ==
- 4 – 20 September: American Samoa at the 2022 Winter Olympics
