= 2020 in American Samoa =

- Decades: 2000s; 2010s; 2020s
- See also: History of American Samoa; History of Samoa; Historical outline of American Samoa; List of years in American Samoa; 2020 in the United States

Events from 2020 in American Samoa.

== Incumbents ==
- US House Delegate: Amata Coleman Radewagen
- Governor: Lolo Matalasi Moliga
- Lieutenant Governor: Lemanu Peleti Mauga

== Events ==
Ongoing – COVID-19 pandemic in Oceania

=== March ===
- 6 March – The government introduced new entry restrictions including restricting flight numbers and requiring travelers from Hawaii to spend 14 days in Hawaii and obtain a health clearance from health authorities.
- 11 March – A government task-force was set up to deal with the virus and quarantining measures have been put in place for incoming visitors.
- 14 March – Half of the 210 passengers on a returning Hawaiian Airlines flight were required to self-quarantine at home.
- 16 March – Following a trip to the US mainland, Governor Lolo Matalasi Moliga self-isolated as a precautionary measure.
- 26 March – Iulogologo Joseph Pereira, executive assistant to the governor and the head of the territory's COVID-19 task force, acknowledged that the territory did not have facilities to test samples of the COVID-19 virus, having to rely on testing facilities in Atlanta, Georgia.

=== April ===
- 19 April – U.S. President Donald Trump declared that a major disaster existed in the territory, responding to a request for help from Governor Lolo Matalasi Moliga on 13 April. This declaration makes the territory eligible for federal assistance to combat the spread of COVID-19. The US Federal Emergency Management Agency has named its Regional 9 administrator Robert Fenton Junior as the Coordinating Officer for any federal recovery operations in the territory.
