= 2017 in American Samoa =

- Decades: 1990s; 2000s; 2010s; 2020s
- See also: History of American Samoa; History of Samoa; Historical outline of American Samoa; List of years in American Samoa; 2017 in the United States

Events in the year 2017 in American Samoa.

== Incumbents ==
- Governor: Lolo Matalasi Moliga
- Lieutenant Governor: Lemanu Peleti Mauga
- Delegate: Amata Coleman Radewagen

== Deaths ==
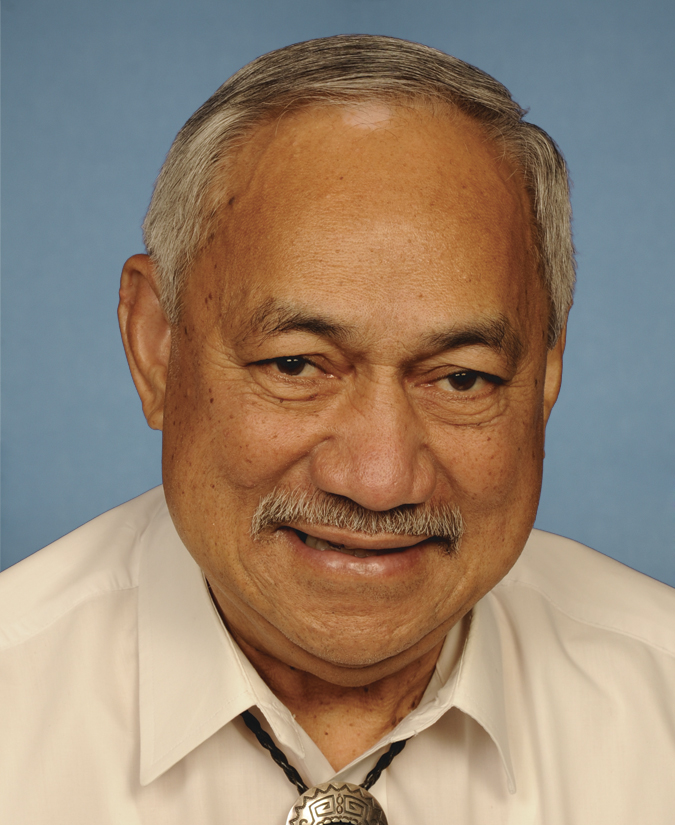
Eni Faleomavaega

- 22 February – Eni Faleomavaega, politician and attorney, Lieutenant Governor (1985–1989), delegate to the U.S. House of Representatives (1989–2015) (b. 1943).
