= 2023 in American Samoa =

- Decades: 2000s; 2010s; 2020s
- See also: History of American Samoa; History of Samoa; Historical outline of American Samoa; List of years in American Samoa; 2023 in the United States

Events from 2023 in American Samoa.

== Incumbents ==
- US House Delegate: Amata Coleman Radewagen
- Governor: Lemanu Peleti Mauga
- Lieutenant Governor: Salo Ale

== Events ==
Ongoing – COVID-19 pandemic in Oceania; COVID-19 pandemic in American Samoa

== Sports ==
- 14 July – 30 July: American Samoa at the 2023 World Aquatics Championships
- 19 August – 27 August: American Samoa at the 2023 World Athletics Championships
- 9 November – 11 November: 2023 Men's Softball Oceania Championship

== Deaths ==
- 21 June – Gaea Pelefoti Failautusi, 83, politician, senator (1995–1999).
