= 2024 in American Samoa =

- Decades: 2000s; 2010s; 2020s
- See also: History of American Samoa; History of Samoa; Historical outline of American Samoa; List of years in American Samoa; 2024 in the United States

Events from 2024 in American Samoa.

== Incumbents ==
- US House Delegate: Amata Coleman Radewagen
- Governor: Lemanu Peleti Mauga
- Lieutenant Governor: Salo Ale

== Events ==
Ongoing – COVID-19 pandemic in Oceania; COVID-19 pandemic in American Samoa

- March 5: 2024 American Samoa presidential caucuses
- November 5: 2024 American Samoa gubernatorial election

== Deaths ==
- June 25 – Sika Anoa‘i, 79, Hall of Fame professional wrestler (WWE).
