= White Sunday (disambiguation) =

White Sunday is a holiday in Samoa.

White Sunday may also refer to:

- White Sunday (Latin: Dominica in albis), another name for the Second Sunday of Easter
- White Sunday (often contracted to "Whitsun"), a British/Irish name for the feast of Pentecost
- White Sunday (album), a 2003 rap album by Mareko
