= 2019 in Samoa =

- Decades: 1990s; 2000s; 2010s; 2020s
- See also: Other events of 2019; Timeline of Samoan history

Events in the year 2019 in Samoa.

== Incumbents ==
- O le Ao o le Malo: Tuimalealiʻifano Vaʻaletoʻa Sualauvi II
- Prime Minister: Tuilaʻepa Saʻilele Malielegaoi

== Events ==
- 11 June – Samoa bans the film Rocketman for its depictions of gay sex.
- 4 September – 2019 Samoa assassination plot
  - After an assassination plot to kill Samoan Prime Minister Tuilaepa A. S. Malielegaoi is foiled, police are working to extradite a Samoan man who lives in Brisbane, Australia.
- 9 September – Three suspects appear in court in Apia, where two of them enter not-guilty pleas and the other a guilty plea on charges of conspiracy to assassinate the Prime Minister of Samoa.
- 18 September – Prosecutiors in the case of the latest attempt to kill Samoan Prime Minister Tuilaepa Sailele Malielegaoi announce that Eletise Leafa Vitale, convicted of the assassination of one of Malielegoai's cabinet members in another failed attempt at killing him in 1999, will testify in the trial against the conspirators of this year's plot.
- 30 October – After months of delay, the Supreme Court of Samoa accepts a closed court bail hearing for two defendants accused of attempting to assassinate Prime Minister of Samoa Tuilaepa Sailele Malielegaoi.
- 1 November – A man who had pled guilty to conspiracy to assassinate the Prime Minister of Samoa, and was due to be sentenced on this date, has changed his plea from guilty to not-guilty.
- 17 November – 2019 Samoa measles outbreak
  - In response to a measles outbreak, Samoa declares a state of emergency, closes all schools and urges all persons under 17 to avoid public gatherings.
- 19 November – Fifteen children are confirmed (and three more suspected) dead from measles in Samoa as the illness epidemic continues within the country.
- 22 November – Samoa confirms that 20 persons, all but one under the age of four, have died of measles, and 11 more are in critical condition. Authorities recorded 1,644 cases since the outbreak began last month.
- 23 November – Conditions worsen in Samoa where the death toll continues to rise and schools remain closed. There are 1,797 confirmed cases as of Saturday, with 153 detected on Friday alone.
- 28 November – The United Nations blames anti-vaccination messages for the current outbreak of measles in the country, where the death toll has risen to 39 and is expected to rise as 200 are reported hospitalised, according to the World Health Organization. Total cases now soar to near 3,000.
- 30 November – The Prime Minister, Tuilaepa Sailele Malielegaoi, announcesthat he will propose a law which would penalize parents who refuse to vaccinate their children, amid an ongoing epidemic that has killed 44 people, mostly children under the age of four.
- 2 December – Police urge people to respect a curfew. Authorities order that children stay at home and announce that Christmas celebrations and public gatherings have been cancelled in order to prevent the epidemic from spreading even further. The death toll from the outbreak stands at 53.
- 3 December – The government makes it illegal to make non-essential domestic travel on the roads while vaccination units cross the country with 40,000 still to be vaccinated. Also, the opposition calls for an inquiry into the low vaccination rates which began after a mistake by two nurses last year which resulted in the deaths of two children.
- 4 December – Amid the imposed curfew, the Samoan government asks unvaccinated families to display a red flag or red cloth in front of their homes to warn others and to aid mass vaccination efforts as the death toll hits 60 and confirmed cases surpass 4,000.
- 6 December – Samoan police arrest Edwin Tamasese, an anti-vaccination campaigner, for incitement against a government order.
- 14 December – The government of Samoa extends the state of emergency until 29 December. it was due to end on 15 December. There have been 72 deaths and more than 5,100 cases to date.
- 29 December – The Samoan government lifts its six-week state of emergency after a mass immunization campaign against measles reduced the death and infection rates.

== Deaths ==
- 1 March – Mike Tamoaieta, 23, Samoan-born New Zealand rugby union player (Blues, North Harbour).
- 11 March – Pua Magasiva, 38, Samoan-born New Zealand actor (Shortland Street, Power Rangers Ninja Storm, 30 Days of Night).
