= 2016 in Samoa =

- Decades: 1990s; 2000s; 2010s; 2020s
- See also: Other events of 2016; Timeline of Samoan history

Events in the year 2016 in Samoa.

== Incumbents ==
- O le Ao o le Malo: Tui Ātua Tupua Tamasese Efi
- Prime Minister: Tuilaepa Aiono Sailele Malielegaoi

== Events ==
- 4 March – 2016 Samoan general election
- 22 April – The Samoan Islands brace for the impact of Cyclone Amos as the Fiji Meteorological Service upgrades the cyclone to a category three storm, with sustained winds as high as 140 km/h at its centre.
