= 2021 in American Samoa =

- Decades: 2000s; 2010s; 2020s
- See also: History of American Samoa; History of Samoa; Historical outline of American Samoa; List of years in American Samoa; 2021 in the United States

Events from 2021 in American Samoa.

== Incumbents ==
- US House Delegate: Amata Coleman Radewagen
- Governor: Lolo Matalasi Moliga (until 3 January), Lemanu Peleti Mauga (starting 3 January)
- Lieutenant Governor: Lemanu Peleti Mauga (until 3 January), Salo Ale (starting 3 January)

== Events ==
Ongoing – COVID-19 pandemic in Oceania; COVID-19 pandemic in American Samoa

3 January – Lemanu Peleti Mauga begins his tenure as Governor of American Samoa,

== Sports ==
- 23 July – 8 August: American Samoa at the 2020 Summer Olympics
