= 2021 in Samoa =

- Decades: 2000s; 2010s; 2020s
- See also: Other events of 2021; Timeline of Samoan history

Events in the year 2021 in Samoa.

== Incumbents ==
- O le Ao o le Malo: Tuimalealiʻifano Vaʻaletoʻa Sualauvi II
- Prime Minister: Tuilaʻepa Saʻilele Malielegaoi (until 24 May), Fiamē Naomi Mata‘afa (from 24 May)

== Events ==
Ongoing — COVID-19 pandemic in Samoa

- 9 April – The 2021 Samoan general election was held.

== Deaths ==
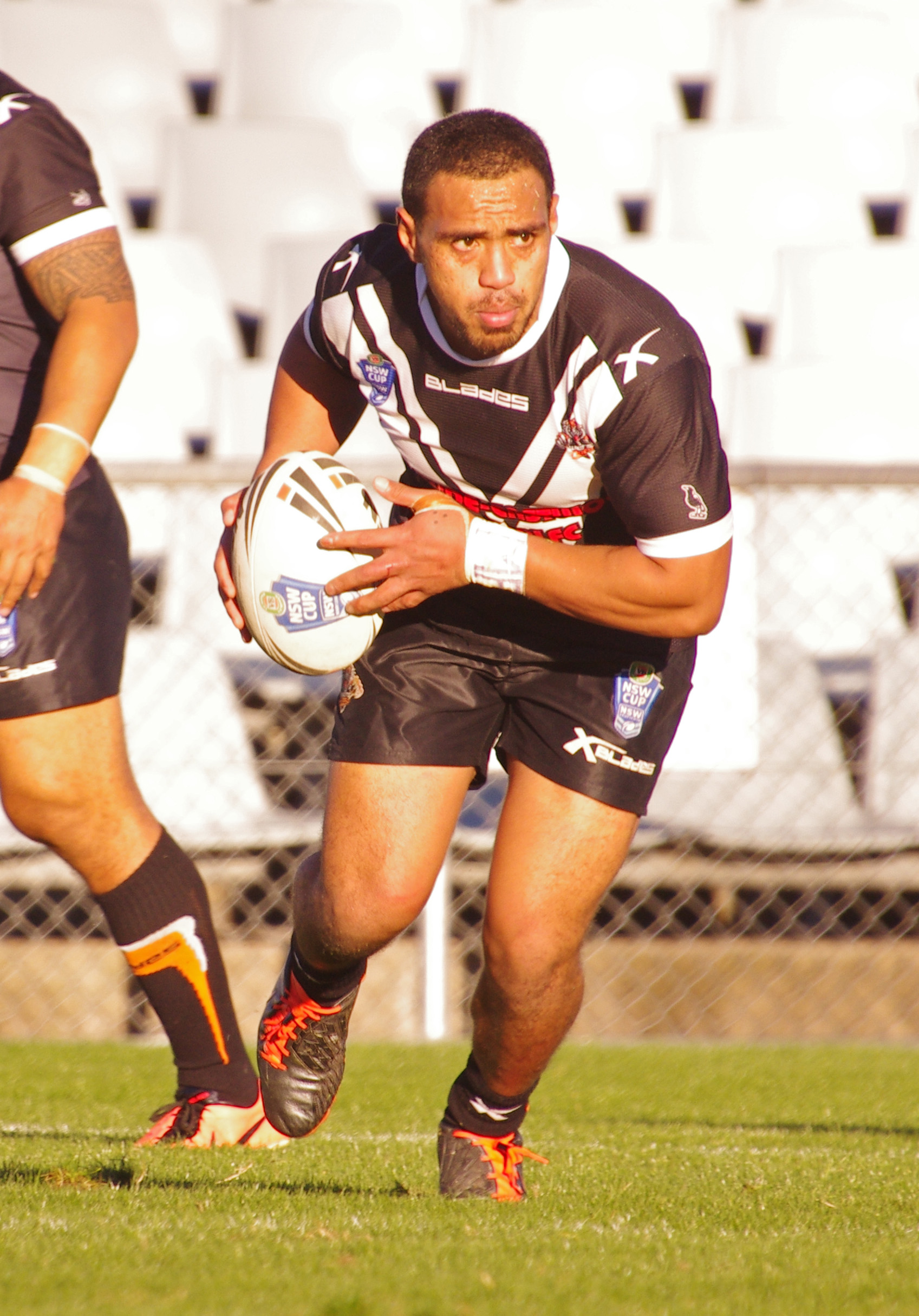
Masada Iosefa

- 19 January – Toleafoa Ken Vaafusuaga Poutoa, politician, MP (since 2016).
- 25 January – Masada Iosefa, 32, rugby league player (Penrith Panthers, Wests Tigers, national team); traffic collision.
- 27 January – Saini Lemamea, 56, rugby union player (national team). (death announced on this date)
