= Israel–Samoa relations =

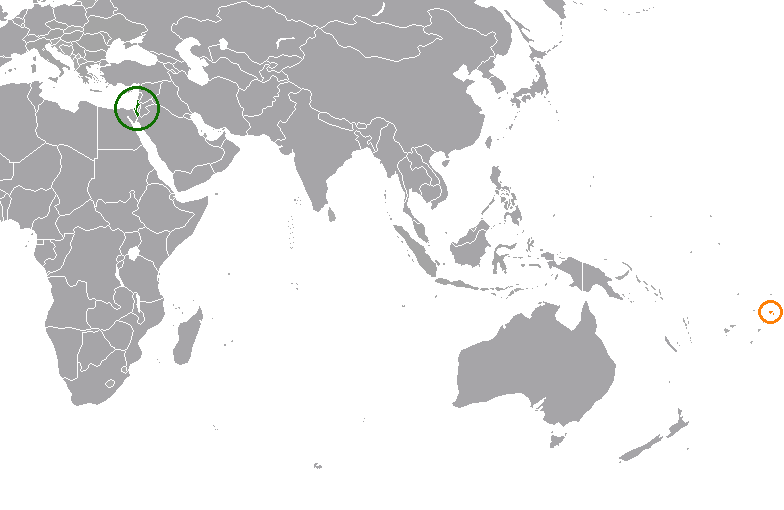

- Israel: Samoa

Israel–Samoa relations are bilateral ties between the State of Israel and the Independent State of Samoa. Israel is accredited to Samoa from its embassy in Wellington, New Zealand. Samoa has an honorary consul in Israel, resides in Ness Ziona.

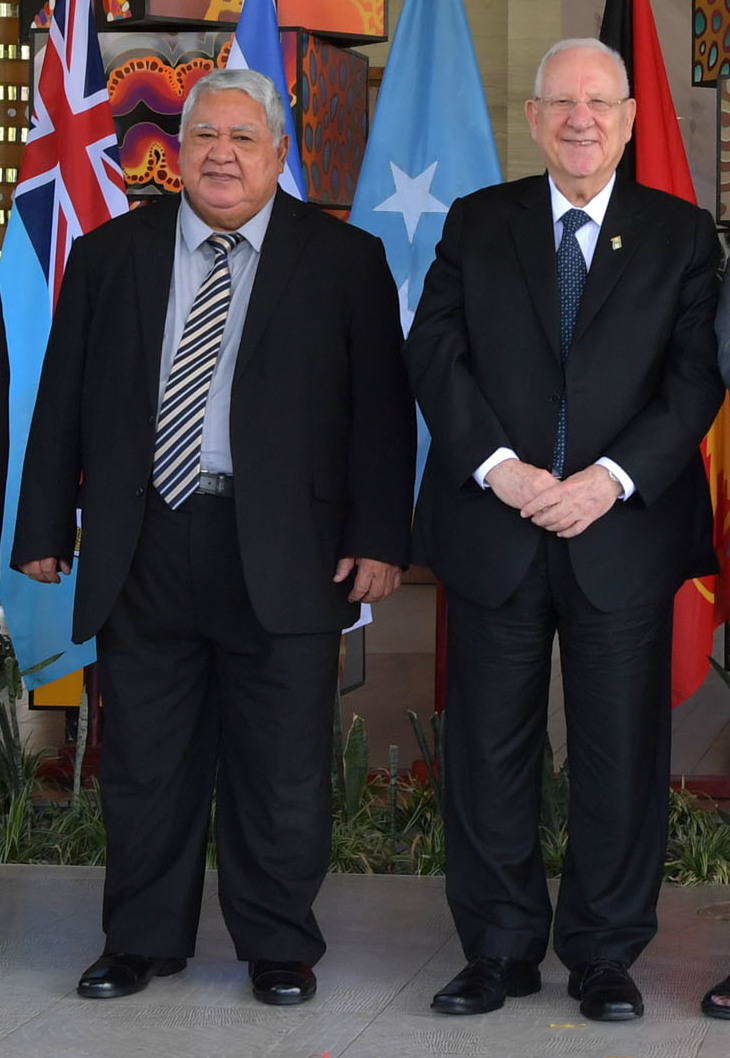
Reuven Rivlin with Tuilaepa Aiono Sailele Malielegaoi, Fiji, 2020

In January 2026, Samoa announced that it would open an embassy in Jerusalem.

== History ==
The State of Israel and the Independent State of Samoa officially established relations on 30 May 1972. Since the establishment of the diplomatic relations, Israel and Samoa have pursued cooperation in many sectors, including development and climate change.

In September 2014, the Israeli vice-minister of Foreign Affairs, Tzachi Hanegbi, paid a visit in Apia along with the Israeli ambassador in New Zealand, Yosef Livna. The Israeli delegation arrived in Samoa to attend a conference on the Small Island countries in the Pacific and the Caribbean.

In January 2017, a Samoan Parliament Member said that his country would always back Israel, "whatever happens".

In March 2019, the Israeli Prime Minister, Benjamin Netanyahu, had a meeting with the Samoan Prime Minister, Tuilaepa Aiono Sailele Malielegaoi, They signed a visa-waiver agreement. In 2020, the Samoan PM met with President Reuven Rivlin when they attended a conference of the Pacific countries in Fiji.

== Diplomatic relations ==
In a diplomatic milestone, Samoa announced it will open an embassy in Jerusalem later in 2026, becoming one of the few nations to locate a full mission in the city. Israel’s Foreign Minister Gideon Sa’ar welcomed the decision, expressing appreciation for Samoa’s consistent support at the United Nations and inviting Samoan Prime Minister Laʻauli Leuatea Schmidt and senior officials to visit Israel to advance preparations.
