= 2022 in Samoa =

- Decades: 2000s; 2010s; 2020s
- See also: Other events of 2022; Timeline of Samoan history

Events in the year 2022 in Samoa.

== Incumbents ==
- O le Ao o le Malo: Tuimalealiʻifano Vaʻaletoʻa Sualauvi II
- Prime Minister: Fiamē Naomi Mataʻafa

== Events ==
Ongoing – COVID-19 pandemic in Samoa

- 22 January – Samoa Prime Minister Fiamē Naomi Mataʻafa announces a three-day lockdown in response to ten positive COVID-19 passengers from a repatriation flight.
- 22 April – Samoa reports five community spread COVID-19 cases on Manono Island, which had been free of the virus until now.
- 27 July – Prime Minister Fiamē Naomi Mataʻafa ends Samoa's state of emergency after two years.
- 23 August – Tuimalealiʻifano Vaʻaletoʻa Sualauvi II is re-elected by the Parliament for a second term as O le Ao o le Malo, the Samoan head of state.

== Deaths ==
- 17 January – Vaʻai Papu Vailupe, 77, politician
- 24 February – Va'aiga Tuigamala, 52, rugby player
- 25 March – Va'ele Pa'ia'aua Iona Sekuini, 58, politician
- 6 May – Kelly Meafua, 31, rugby player
- 2 August – Jack Netzler, 82, politician
