= 2017 in Samoa =

- Decades: 1990s; 2000s; 2010s; 2020s
- See also: Other events of 2017; Timeline of Samoan history

Events in the year 2017 in Samoa.

== Incumbents ==
- O le Ao o le Malo: Tui Ātua Tupua Tamasese Efi (until 20 July); Va'aletoa Sualauvi II onwards
- Prime Minister: Tuilaepa Aiono Sailele Malielegaoi

== Events ==
- 16 June – Samoa becomes a Christian state. Article 1 of the Samoan Constitution states that “Samoa is a Christian nation founded of God the Father, the Son and the Holy Spirit”.
- 5 July – 2017 Samoan o le Ao o le Malo election:
  - Samoa's Legislative Assembly appoints Tuimalealiifano Va'aletoa Sualauvi II as O le Ao o le Malo.
- 12 November – Virgin Samoa ceases operations.

== Deaths ==
- 17 April – Rosey, 47, Samoan-American professional wrestler (WWE, AJPW, FMW)
- 13 December – Eti Saaga, 67, Samoan-born American Samoan poet and writer.
