= 2025 in American Samoa =

- Decades: 2000s; 2010s; 2020s
- See also: History of American Samoa; History of Samoa; Historical outline of American Samoa; List of years in American Samoa; 2025 in the United States

Events from 2025 in American Samoa.

== Incumbents ==
- US House Delegate: Amata Coleman Radewagen
- Governor: Lemanu Peleti Mauga (until 3 January), Pula Nikolao Pula (starting 3 January)
- Lieutenant Governor: Salo Ale(until 3 January), Pulu Ae Ae Jr. (starting 3 January)

== Events ==
- February 10 – The United States Coast Guard are deployed to American Samoa to perform various exercises, including the boarding of six U.S.-flagged commercial fishing vessels, and six foreign vessels.
- April 3 – The state of Alaska charges ten people from American Samoa with illegally voting in local elections in the town of Whittier. Unlike other U.S. territories, American Samoans are not American citizens but rather U.S. nationals, and thus not allowed to vote in Alaskan elections.
- April 17 – The 125th American Samoa Flag Day is celebrated in Pago Pago.
