= 2025 in Samoa =

- Decades: 2000s; 2010s; 2020s
- See also: Other events of 2025; Timeline of Samoan history

Events in the year 2025 in Samoa.

== Incumbents ==
- O le Ao o le Malo: Tuimalealiʻifano Vaʻaletoʻa Sualauvi II
- Prime Minister: Fiamē Naomi Mataʻafa (until 16 September); Laʻauli Leuatea Schmidt (since 16 September)

== Events ==
=== January ===
- 6 January – Mahonri Schwalger resigns as coach of the Samoa national rugby union team following allegations of sexual misconduct.
- 10 January – Laauli Leuatea Schmidt is dismissed as agriculture and fisheries minister following allegations of misconduct.
- 14 January – Prime Minister Fiamē Naomi Mataʻafa dismisses Women, Community and Social Development minister Mulipola Anarosa Ale-Molio'o, Communication and Information Technology minister Toelupe Poumulinuku Onesemo and Commerce, Industry, and Labor minister Leota Laki Sio amid a dispute within her FAST Party.
- 15 January – FAST party chair Laauli Leuatea Schmid expels Prime Minister Mata'afa and four other cabinet ministers from the party.
- 23 January – Samoa and China sign a new visa exemption agreement.
- 29 January – Authorities seize 10 kilograms of crystal methamphetamine from a shipping container that arrived from the United States and arrest three people in what is reported as the "largest known drug smuggling operation" in the country.

=== February ===
- 8 February – Miss Samoa's Litara Ieremia Allan wins the 2025 Miss Pacific Islands pageant in the Solomon Islands.
- 12 February – The Samoan Government lifts a "precautionary zone" around the wreckage of HMNZS Manawanui following testing by the Scientific Research Organisation of Samoa (SROS). However, a 2 km prohibition zone around the sunken ship remains in force.
- 25 February – Prime Minister Fiamē Naomi Mataʻafa survives a no-confidence motion filed against her in parliament by the Human Rights Protection Party.

=== May ===
- 27 May – The government of Prime Minister Fiamē Naomi Mataʻafa collapses after its budget is voted down by parliament.

=== August ===
- 15 August — The Government announces changes to the school calendar after a dengue outbreak delays the opening of schools nationwide.
- 29 August – 2025 Samoan general election: The FAST party wins a majority of 30 seats in the Legislative Assembly of Samoa, followed by the Human Rights Protection Party with 14. Prime Minister Mata'afa's Samoa Uniting Party wins three seats, making her unable to retain the premiership.

=== September ===
- 16 September — Laʻauli Leuatea Schmidt of the FAST party is inaugurated as prime minister.

=== October ===
- 6 October – The New Zealand government agrees to pay Samoa 10 million tala ($3.6 million) in compensation for the sinking of HMNZS Manawanui in 2024.

== Holidays ==
- 1 January – New Year's Day
- 30 March – Ramadan
- 18 April – Good Friday
- 19 April – Easter Saturday
- 21 April – Easter Monday
- 12 May – Mother's Day holiday
- 1 June – Independence Day
- 11 August – Father's Day holiday
- 13 October – Lotu a Tamaiti/Children's Service holiday
- 25 December – Christmas Day
- 26 December – Boxing Day
