= 2020 in Samoa =

- Decades: 2000s; 2010s; 2020s
- See also: Other events of 2020; Timeline of Samoan history

Events in the year 2020 in Samoa.

== Incumbents ==
- O le Ao o le Malo: Tuimalealiʻifano Vaʻaletoʻa Sualauvi II
- Prime Minister: Tuilaʻepa Saʻilele Malielegaoi

== Events ==
Ongoing – COVID-19 pandemic in Oceania

=== January ===
- 28 January – Two nationals from the country who had briefly stopped in China were placed into quarantine for two weeks at the Faleolo District Hospital.

=== February ===
- 9 February – Eight Samoan nationals travelling from India were denied entry into the country after catching a connecting flight in Singapore.
- 22 February – The country banned all cruise ships from visiting the country.
- 29 February – The government announced restrictions on air travel, with the frequency of international flights into Samoa being reduced from 2 March.

=== March ===
- 18 March – The first suspected case of COVID-19 was reported in the country: an individual who had traveled from New Zealand. Bodily samples from the person were taken to Melbourne for testing. In response to the case, the government required all travelers including Samoan citizens to undergo a medical checkup upon returning.
- 20 March – The country declared a state of emergency, closing its borders to all but returning citizens.
- 21 March – The Health Ministry confirmed that eight suspected cases of the COVID-19 were being tested. All of the individuals had a prior history of travel or contact with relatives who traveled abroad.
- 22 March – Prime Minister Tuilaʻ Saʻiele Malielegaoi announced that the first suspected case of COVID-19 had been cleared of the virus. While he confirmed that six of the eight suspected cases had tested negative for the COVID-19, they were still awaiting test results for the remaining two patients from New Zealand. That same day, Samoa also suspended air travel with Australia and restricted flights from New Zealand.
- 24 March – It was reported that a total of seven suspected cases of the COVID-19 were awaiting testing in New Zealand.
- 25 March – The prime minister announced that individuals that did not adhere to the COVID-19 restriction will be fined.
- 26 March – The government introduced lockdown measures including banning fishing boats from entering the country and fining businesses that breached the quarantine. Only cargo ships carrying goods and petrol will be allowed to enter Samoa.

=== April ===
- 11 April – The government passed a US$23.6 million relief package to help the country's hotel sector, which had been forced to lay-off 500 hotel workers by the economic fallout of the COVID-19 pandemic.
- 15 April – The government eased some state of emergency restrictions including reopening inter-islander maritime travel and public transportation with restrictions on operating hours and passengers. Restaurants and markets were allowed to reopen with limited hours. However, social distancing rules and other emergency restrictions remained in force.
- 20 April – Radio New Zealand reported that nearly 300 had been arrested in the country for violating the "Covid-19 State of Emergency Orders", which came into force on 21 March.

=== May ===
- 14 May – Malielegaoi ruled out the New Zealand Government's proposal for a "Pacific travel bubble" due to the unwillingness of Canberra and Wellington to test travelers and fears of a resurgence of the 2019 measles outbreak in Samoa.

=== June ===
- 10 June – Prime Minister Malielegaoi announced the relaxation of lockdown restrictions on religious services, street vendors, weddings, and village matai councils. Street vendors will only be allowed to sell fruits, vegetables, cooked food and certain textiles while selling on footpaths will remain prohibited. Churches must practise two-meters social distancing but major events such as church conferences and national meetings remain prohibited. The new State of Emergency rules also allowed weddings in hotels but limited the guest list to 50 people. Market activities, beach and river excursions are banned on Sunday. There remains a five-person limit on funerals, traditional title bestowals, birthdays, reunions, and opening ceremonies for building.

=== September ===
- 11 September – Deputy Prime Minister Fiamē Naomi Mataʻafa resigns over three proposed constitutional amendments, which would alter the power of the land and titles court. She also leaves the Human Rights Protection Party. Other MPs have already left the party over the issue and formed a new opposition party.
