= 2024 in Samoa =

- Decades: 2000s; 2010s; 2020s
- See also: Other events of 2024; Timeline of Samoan history

Events in the year 2024 in Samoa.

== Incumbents ==
- O le Ao o le Malo: Tuimalealiʻifano Vaʻaletoʻa Sualauvi II
- Prime Minister: Fiamē Naomi Mataʻafa

== Events ==
=== May ===
- 10 May - TV3 moves its operations online after becoming unable to continue to afford broadcasting traditionally.

=== October ===
- 5-6 October - The Royal New Zealand Navy specialist dive and hydrographic vessel HMNZS Manawanui sinks after running aground and catching fire near Siumu in Upolu island. All 75 people on board are evacuated.
- 21-26 October – 2024 Commonwealth Heads of Government Meeting at Apia.
- 23-26 October - King Charles III visits Samoa.

=== November ===
- 20 November – The New Zealand Parliament passes legislation restoring the right to New Zealand citizenship for people born in Samoa between 1924 and 1949.
- 29 November – The initial report from the naval inquiry into the sinking of HMNZS Manawanui attributes the sinking to human error.

== Holidays ==
- 1 January - New Year's Day
- 29 March - Good Friday
- 30 March - Easter Saturday
- 1 April - Easter Monday
- 10 April – Ramadan
- 13 May – Mother's Day holiday
- 1 June – Independence Day
- 12 August – Father's Day holiday
- 14 October – Lotu a Tamaiti/Children's Service holiday
- 25 December - Christmas Day
- 26 December – Boxing Day

== Deaths ==
- 10 April – Tusa Misi Tupuola, politician, MP (2011–2016) (death announced on this date)
- 26 July – Lionel Elika Fatupaito, boxing coach (Olympic national team)
