= Lopaoʻo Natanielu Mua =

Samoan politician

Minister of Agriculture, Fisheries and Scientific Research
- In office 2 September 2017 – 24 May 2021
- Prime Minister: Tuilaʻepa Saʻilele Malielegaoi
- Preceded by: Laʻauli Leuatea Schmidt
- Succeeded by: Laʻauli Leuatea Schmidt

Member of the Samoan Parliament for Vaisigano No. 1
- In office 2 August 2011 – 9 April 2021
- Preceded by: Tufuga Gafoleata Faitua
- Succeeded by: Niuava Eti Malolo

Personal details
- Party: Human Rights Protection Party

Lopaoʻo Natanielu Mua is a Samoan politician and former Cabinet Minister. He is a member of the Human Rights Protection Party.

Lopaoʻo grew up in a family of farmers and worked in farming and civil construction projects in both Samoa and New Zealand. He holds a degree in law from the University of the South Pacific and a degree in advance parliamentary governance from McGill University in Canada.

He was first elected to the Legislative Assembly of Samoa in the 2016 Samoan general election. He was appointed to Cabinet as Minister of Agriculture, Fisheries and Scientific Research in September 2017, replacing Laʻauli Leuatea Schmidt. As minister of agriculture and fisheries Lopao'o proposed to stop the sale of fresh coconuts to Samoa as a way to encourage farmers to meet the growing demand for copra. During the 2020 COVID-19 pandemic, Lopaoʻo choose to keep importing food from China, as other countries in the region halted all trade with China in an effort to stall the spread of the virus.

He is married to Siaumau and they have eight children. He is a Lay Preacher and a member of the Methodist Standing Committee Board.

He lost his seat in the 2021 Samoan general election.

Legislative Assembly of Samoa
Preceded by Tufuga Gafoleata Faitua	Member of Parliament for Vaisigano No. 1; 2011–2021	Succeeded by Niuava Eti Malolo
Political offices
Preceded by Laʻauli Leuatea Schmidt	Minister of Agriculture, Fisheries and Scientific Research; 2017–2021	Succeeded by Laʻauli Leuatea Schmidt
