= Niuava Eti Malolo =

Samoan politician

Minister of Agriculture and Fisheries
- Incumbent
- Assumed office 15 January 2025
- Prime Minister: Fiamē Naomi Mataʻafa
- Preceded by: Laʻauli Leuatea Polataivao

Member of the Samoa Parliament for Vaisigano No. 1
- Incumbent
- Assumed office 9 April 2021
- Preceded by: Lopao'o Natanielu Mua

Personal details
- Party: Fa'atuatua i le Atua Samoa ua Tasi

Niuava Eti Malolo is a Samoan politician and Cabinet Minister. He is a member of the FAST Party.

Niuava is from Vaisala in the Vaisigano district. He worked for more than two decades as a school principal before becoming a public servant for the Ministry of Natural Resources and Environment. He was first elected to the Legislative Assembly of Samoa in the 2021 Samoan general election, defeating Minister of Agriculture and Fisheries Lopao'o Natanielu Mua. An electoral petition against him by Lopao'o was dismissed. On 28 July 2021 he was appointed Associate Minister of Works Transport and Infrastructure.

On 15 January 2025 he was appointed Minister of Agriculture and Fisheries following the sacking of Laʻauli Leuatea Polataivao.
