= 2023 Samoa floods =

Natural disaster in Samoa

In June 2023, Samoa was hit by heavy floods. Savaiʻi was the most affected region with widespread power outages and damaged roads and bridges. Homes were destroyed in Saipipi, and floodwaters reached a meter deep in Sapapaliʻi. The floods were a result of heavy rain, with 300mm of rain falling in 24 hours.

Following damaging floods in 2020, Samoa was aided by the United Nations Development Programme, the Global Environment Facility and the Green Climate Fund to build flood resilience.

Samoa has been at increased risk from flooding.
