= 2018 in Samoa =

- Decades: 1990s; 2000s; 2010s; 2020s
- See also: Other events of 2018; Timeline of Samoan history

Events in the year 2018 in Samoa.

== Incumbents ==
- O le Ao o le Malo: Va'aletoa Sualauvi II
- Prime Minister: Tuilaepa Aiono Sailele Malielegaoi

== Events ==
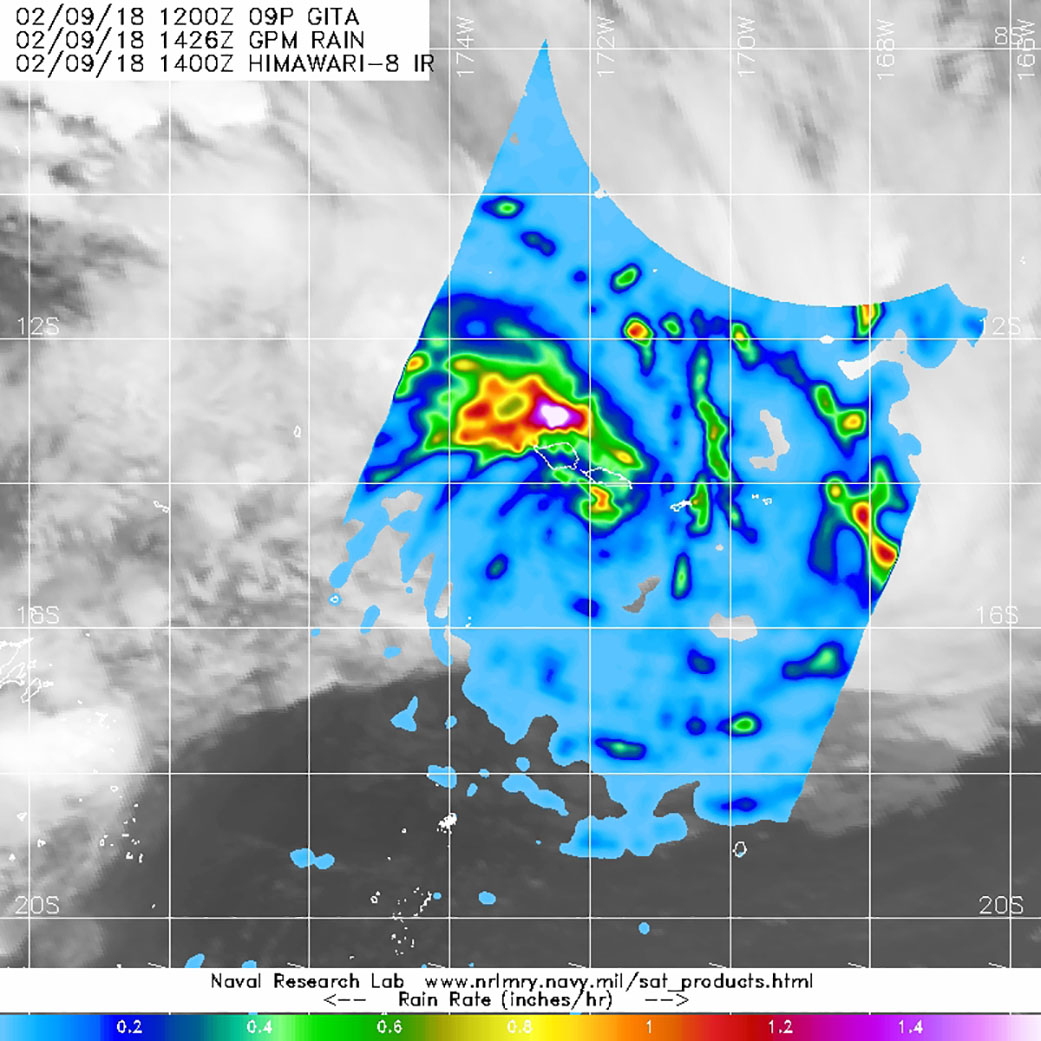
Global Precipitation Measurement satellite image of Gita near the Samoan islands on 9 February. Heavy rain bands with rainfall rates of 25 to 41 mm (1 to 1.6 in) per hour were identified near the islands.

- 8 to 9 February – Samoa was struck by the Cyclone Gita, and a state of disaster was declared for the nation on 10 February.

== Deaths ==
- 2 April – Tuiloma Pule Lameko, politician (b. 1934).
