= 2019 Samoa assassination plot =

Attempt to kill Prime Minister of Samoa

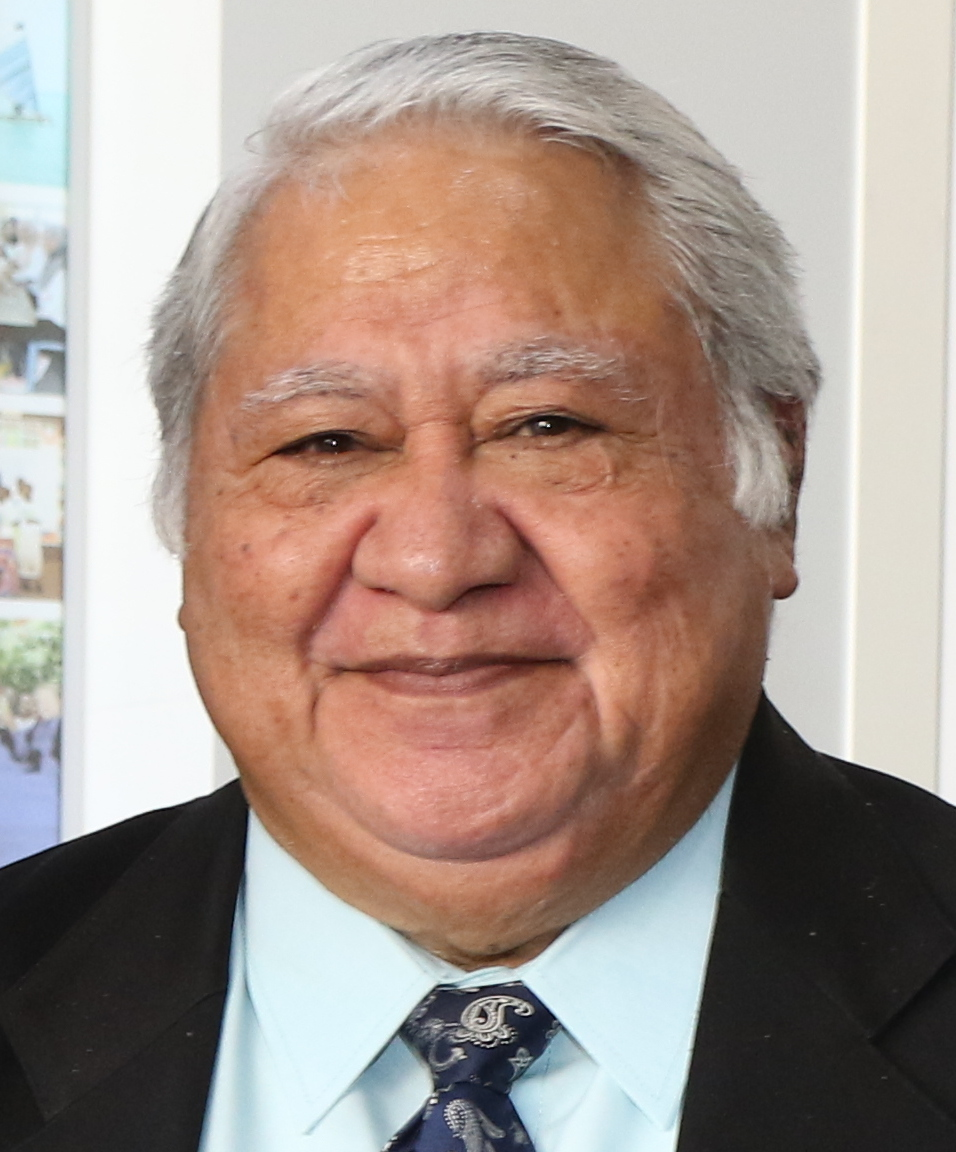
Tuilaʻepa Saʻilele Malielegaoi in 2018

The 2019 Samoa assassination plot was an alleged attempt to assassinate Samoan Prime Minister Tuilaʻepa Saʻilele Malielegaoi. The plot was revealed to the public by Police Commissioner Fuiavailiili Egon Keil on 13 August 2019. One person was convicted of conspiracy to murder in 2020, and another two in 2023. A fourth man has been extradited from Australia and is currently awaiting trial.

== Arrests ==
On 16 August 2019 police announced they had arrested three people on charges of conspiracy to commit murder. The arrests were made after a tipoff from the village council of Lauli'i. After an initial hearing on 26 August, two of the suspects - blogger Malele Atofu Paulo and teacher Lema'i Faioso Sione - appeared in court on 3 September and pleaded not guilty. On 4 September Samoan police announced they were attempting to extradite a fourth man, Talalelei Pauga, from Australia.

On 9 September 2019, Leiloa, Paulo and Sione appeared in court together for the first time. Paulo and Sione entered a not-guilty plea, while Leiloa pleaded guilty to a charge of conspiring to commit murder. All the accused were remanded in custody. On 1 November 2019, when he was due to be sentenced, Leiloa asked the judge to change his plea from guilty to not-guilty, after being advised by his lawyer. On 23 December 2020 Leiloa was sentenced to five years imprisonment.

On 28 February 2020 Paulo and Sione were granted bail. Security around Tuilaepa was increased as a result. On 23 July 2020, the Supreme Court refused permission for Sione and Paulo to return to Australia. Both are Australian residents.

In February 2023 the Samoan government requested a further delay in the trial of Paulo and Sione so that they could be tried alongside Pauga, who was still in Australia. They also requested a delay to withdraw the charges against one party, so they could testify for the prosecution. The court refused to grant a delay and the case was scheduled for trial. The trial began on 13 March 2023 not before a jury but before hand-picked assessors with publication of evidence and reports of the proceedings suppressed. Neither testified for the prosecution. On 24 March 2023 both men were found guilty. On 11 August 2023 they were each sentenced to four years imprisonment.

=== Talalelei Pauga extradition and pre-trial proceedings ===
On 20 August 2020 Australian Federal Police officer Natalie Marks arrested Brisbane man Talalelei Pauga for extradition to Samoa. He was remanded at Arthur Gorrie Correctional Centre pending assessment of eligibility for extradition. A subsequent challenge before the Federal Court of Australia saw the Australian Federal Police ordered to investigate Pauga's arrest and why he was detained without access to a lawyer for a month. Proceedings are underway in the Federal Court of Australia before the Honourable Justice Colvin seeking to quash the remands made by the Brisbane Magistrates Court. On 16 September 2021, Faatasi Puleiata Veataui withdrew the Samoan warrant for the arrest of Mr Pauga which he had previously issued on 25 February 2020. Samoa now finds itself in the position of having made a request to Australia for the extradition of Mr Pauga when there is no warrant for his arrest in Samoa. Samoa has nevertheless opposed granting bail to Mr Pauga. On 1 October 2021 in a hearing before Justice Colvin, Samoa Queens Counsel for Samoa unsuccessfully sought to prevent an adjournment of bail proceedings which Mr Pauga sought in order to bring further evidence about conditions within the Queensland prison system. On 16 September 2022 the Federal Court of Australia set aside a determination that Pauga was eligible for extradition. Despite this, Pauga remained in custody.

Pauga was extradited from Australia on 1 September 2023.

Pauga was granted bail in September 2023.

At a preliminary hearing in December 2023 the Supreme Court of Samoa was told that prosecution had not yet provided its witness statements to the accused and the trial was not ready to proceed. The Court also ruled that the transcripts of the trial of the co-defendants would not be made available to Mr Pauga's defence lawyers. The Court was also told that a ruling by Justice Vaai on the validity of the arrest warrant upon which Pauga was extradited was still outstanding from February 2022.

On 23 December 2023 a trial date was set for the period 18 to 28 March 2024. Justice Tuatagaloa had also said the Courts would not be accepting any more delays. Justice Tuatagaloa told Pauga’s lawyers that if any further delaying tactics, may result in a reconsideration of bail conditions for the defendant.

In the last week of February 2024 Mr Pauga's lawyers requested the recusal of Supreme Court Justice Niava Mata Tuatagaloa from presiding over his case on grounds including that she had presided over the trial of the other defendants and made rulings in that trial, had refused Pauga access to the trial transcripts of evidence and had made the comments at the 23 December 2023 hearing which attributed the delays in the trial process to the defence, when in fact the delays were due to the Court itself not yet having delivered a decision on the validity of the extradition warrant and Information which was reserved by Justice Vaai in May 2022. Talalelei Pauga remains out on bail as Court proceedings continue.
