= COVID-19 pandemic in Samoa =

- Disease: COVID-19
- Pathogen: SARS-CoV-2
- Location: Samoa
- First outbreak: Wuhan, China
- Arrival date: 18 November 2020
- Confirmed cases: 17,057
- Deaths: 31
- Fatality rate: 0.18%
- Vaccinations: 177,954 (fully vaccinated)

Government website
- Samoan Health Ministry's COVID-19 webpage

The COVID-19 pandemic in Samoa was part of the worldwide pandemic of coronavirus disease 2019 (COVID-19) caused by severe acute respiratory syndrome coronavirus 2 (SARS-CoV-2). The virus was confirmed to have reached Samoa on 18 November 2020. The country reported its second case on 27 November.

In January 2022, Samoa reported several cases in managed isolation among passengers from an Australian repatriation flight, reaching a total of 26 cases by 25 January. In response, the Samoan Government imposed a nationwide lockdown, which was subsequently extended on 25 January 2022.

== Background ==
On 12 January 2020, the World Health Organization (WHO) confirmed that a novel coronavirus was the cause of a respiratory illness in a cluster of people in Wuhan City, Hubei Province, China, which was reported to the WHO on 31 December 2019.

The case fatality ratio for COVID-19 has been much lower than SARS of 2003, but the transmission has been significantly greater, with a significant total death toll.

== Timeline ==
Cases

Deaths

=== 2020 ===
Travel into Samoa was increasingly restricted in an effort to prevent the spread of COVID-19 into the country. Before entering the country, people were required to have spent at least 14 days in a country free of the virus, as well as complete a medical clearance. On 27 January 2020, the Government of Samoa ordered all travellers entering Samoa to fill in a Special Health Declaration form. The Government also required mainland Chinese travelers to self-isolate for 14 days and discouraged travel to China or other countries affected by COVID-19 virus. Two Samoan nationals who had briefly stopped in China were placed into quarantine on 28 January for two weeks at the Faleolo District Hospital.

On 3 February 2020, four Samoan nationals (three students and a former student) were evacuated from Wuhan aboard a chartered Air New Zealand flight with assistance from New Zealand, Australia, and the Chinese authorities. On 9 February, eight Samoan nationals travelling from India via Singapore and Fiji were denied entry into Samoa and sent back to Fiji. The Samoan authorities had designated Singapore a high risk country due to the surge in cases there. These Samoans were housed at a hotel in Nadi, Fiji and not allowed to return to Samoa until the next weekend. On 22 February, Samoa banned all cruise ships from visiting the country. On 29 February, the government announced restrictions on air travel, with the frequency of international flights into Samoa being reduced from 2 March.

On 18 March, Samoa reported its first suspected case of COVID-19, an individual who had traveled from New Zealand. The patient was placed into isolation at Apia's Tupua Tamasese Meaole Hospital. Samples were sent to Melbourne for testing, which would take 10-20 working days to return. In response, the Samoan Government required all travelers including Samoan citizens to undergo a medical checkup upon returning. On 20 March, Samoa declared a state of emergency, closing its borders to all but returning citizens. On 21 March, the Samoan Health Ministry confirmed that eight suspected cases of COVID-19 were being tested. All of these individuals had a prior history of travel or contact with relatives who had traveled abroad. On 22 March, Prime Minister Tuilaepa Aiono Sailele Malielegaoi announced that the first suspected case of COVID-19 had been cleared of the virus and also confirmed that six of the eight suspected cases had tested negative. The authorities were still awaiting test results for the remaining two patients from New Zealand. That same day, Samoa also suspended air travel with Australia and restricted flights from New Zealand. On 24 March, it was reported that a total of seven suspected cases of COVID-19 were awaiting testing in New Zealand. On 25 March, Malielegaoi announced that individuals that did not adhere to the COVID-19 restriction would be fined. On 26 March, the Samoan Government introduced lockdown measures including banning fishing boats from entering Samoa and fining businesses that breached the quarantine. Only cargo ships carrying goods and petrol were allowed to enter Samoa.

On 11 April, the Samoan Government passed a US$23.6 million relief package to help the country's hotel sector, which had been forced to lay-off 500 hotel workers by the economic fallout of the COVID-19 pandemic. On 15 April, the Samoan Government eased some state of emergency restrictions including reopening inter-islander maritime travel and public transportation with restrictions on operating hours and passengers. Restaurants and markets were allowed to reopen with limited hours. However, social distancing rules and other emergency restrictions remained in force. On 20 April, Radio New Zealand reported that nearly 300 had been arrested in Samoa for violating the "Covid-19 State of Emergency Orders", which came into force on 21 March. Around this date human rights organisation Brown Girl Woke shared donated masks for free to its community members.

On 14 May, Prime Minister Malielegaoi ruled out the New Zealand Government's proposal for a "Pacific travel bubble" due to the unwillingness of Canberra and Wellington to test travelers and fears of a resurgence of the 2019 measles outbreak in Samoa. On 10 June, Malielegaoi announced the relaxation of lockdown restrictions on religious services, street vendors, weddings, and village matai councils. Street vendors were only allowed to sell fruits, vegetables, cooked food and certain textiles while selling on footpaths remained prohibited. Churches were to adhere to two-meters social distancing but major events such as church conferences and national meetings remained prohibited. The new State of Emergency rules also allowed weddings in hotels but limited the guest list to 50 people. Market activities, beach and river excursions were banned on Sunday. There remained a five-person limit on funerals, traditional title bestowals, birthdays, reunions, and opening ceremonies for building.

Following the detection of three new cases in American Samoa resulting from sea travel in early November, Samoan authorities launched an investigation into whether the three infected individuals had disembarked from their container ship Fesco Askold which had docked in Apia's port over the weekend. On 18 November, Samoa confirmed its first potential case: a sailor who had returned from Auckland, New Zealand the previous week. The sailor had undergone managed isolation. He had tested positive the previous night but subsequently tested negative during a second test. He was cared for at an isolation ward in Tupua Tamasese Motootua Hospital. The sailor subsequently tested negative for COVID-19 during a third nasal swab test and remained under observation. He was part of a contingent of 27 Samoan sailors who had working with the Mediterranean Shipping Company in Europe. The sailors were part of a contingent of 247 passengers who had been repatriated to Samoa on a chartered Air New Zealand flight. On 24 November, Samoa extended its quarantine period from 14 to 21 days as a result of a spike in COVID-19 cases in California. On 27 November, Samoa reported its second case in managed isolation, a 70-year-old man who had traveled from Melbourne and Auckland to Apia on the same flight as the first suspected case. It is possible both cases were simply detection of viral fragments from non-contagious historical cases as neither case had symptoms and their close contacts tested negative. On 29 December, Samoa banned travellers from the United Kingdom and South Africa under a new amended travel advisory for repatriation flights. This was in response to a discovery of variants of the coronavirus Alpha variant and Beta variant which appears to be more contagious than previous variants.

=== 2021 ===
A third positive PCR test was returned on 12 February 2021. On 24 March 2021, Dr Take Naseri, the Director-General of Health, confirmed that individuals 18 years old and over would receive the Oxford–AstraZeneca COVID-19 vaccine. However, those aged 85 years and over and with terminal illnesses would not be vaccinated. Samoa had received 79,000 AstraZeneca vaccine doses with the assistance of New Zealand. In early May 2021, Dr Naseri confirmed that Samoa would reopen its borders once 98% of the population had been vaccinated. By 8 May, 10,911 individuals (roughly seven percent of the population) had been vaccinated. A further 55,000 vaccines were expected to reach Samoa in June 2021. Samoan health authorities were in negotiation with New Zealand to procure more AstraZeneca vaccine doses. On 11 August, a country-wide door-to-door mass vaccination campaign was launched. The National Emergency Operations Committee also announced that more than half of the eligible population had received their first dose and 22 percent had been fully vaccinated.

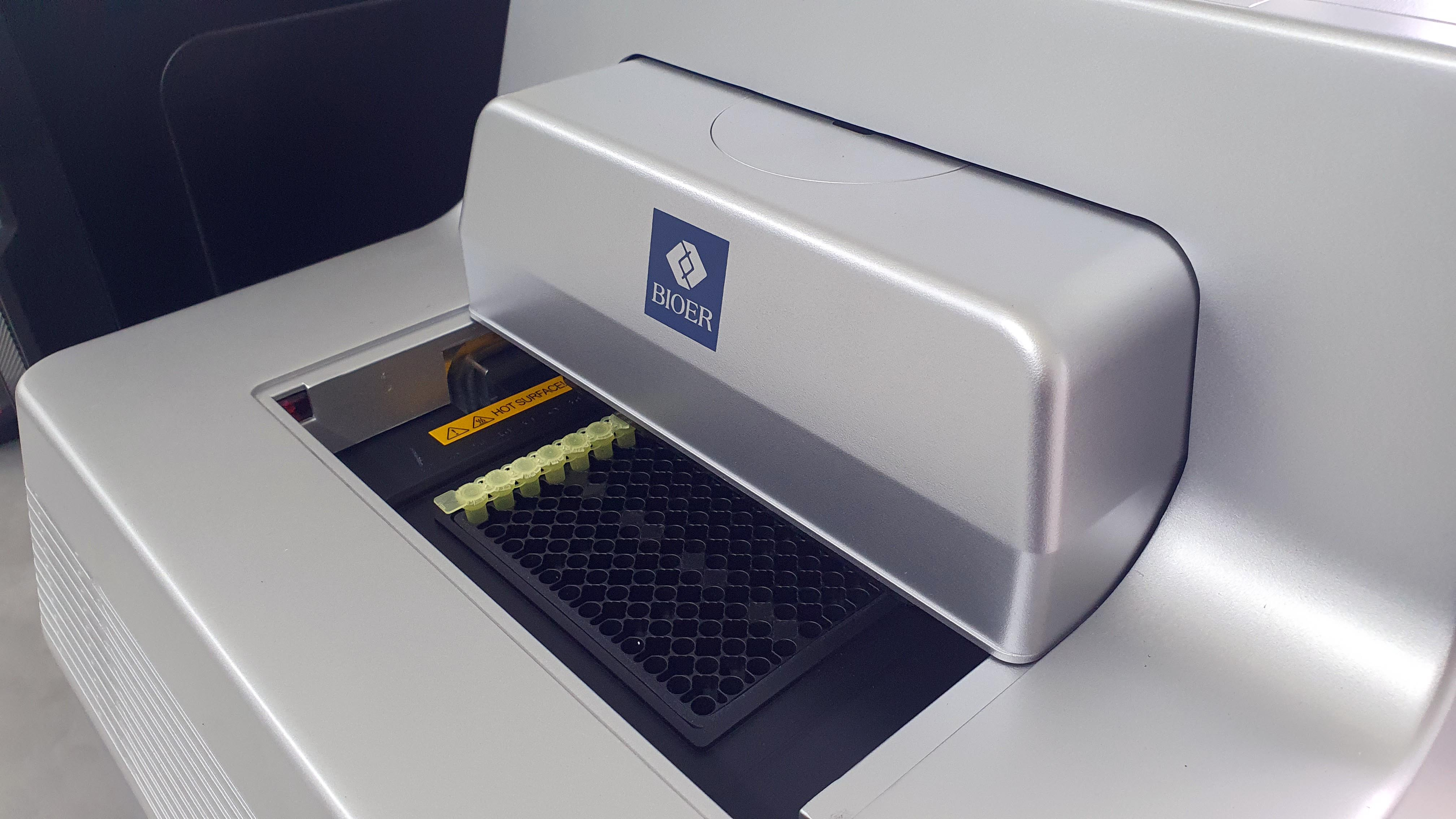
COVID-19 Equipment donated to Samoa in 2022

=== 2022 ===
The Scientific Research Organization of Samoa received new equipment to aid in diagnosis. International Atomic Energy Agency (IAEA) had dispatched equipment to countries around the world to enable them to use a nuclear-derived technique to rapidly detect the coronavirus that causes COVID-19 and Samoa was on the list. On 20 January, Samoa reported ten cases in managed isolation, who had arrived on a Qantas charter flight from Brisbane in Australia. The youngest individual was an 11 month old baby while the oldest individual was 63 years old. Nine passengers were identified as close contacts of the positive cases and went into isolation. In response, the Samoan Government postponed a repatriation flight from New Zealand that was scheduled to depart on 22 January. By 22 January, the number of COVID-19 positive cases aboard the flight had risen to 15. In response, the Samoan Government imposed a 48-hour lockdown on the country from 6pm on Friday (21 January) to Monday (24 January). Under this state of emergency, all residents except for essential workers were required to stay at home and avoid the roads. Businesses, schools and restaurants were closed while travel and mass gatherings were banned. The Samoan Government also warned that lockdown violators could be fined $2,000. On 25 January, Samoan Prime Minister Fiame Naomi Mata'afa extended the nationwide lockdown until the night of 27 January after five frontline nurses caring for the infected 15 passengers tested positive for COVID-19. In addition, the Government allowed certain businesses and services including petrol and cash power outlets, banks, money transfer services, and chemists to open for limited hours between 8am and 2 pm. The Samoa National Emergency Operations Centre's (ECO) chairperson, Agafili Shem Leo also confirmed that authorities were investigating rumors that some passengers aboard the Qantas flight were planning to attend a funeral in Samoa. That same day, the Samoan Ministry of Health confirmed 11 new cases in managed isolation, bringing the total number of COVID-19 cases to 26. On 27 January, Samoa reported one new case, bringing the total number of confirmed case to 27. This case was a passenger from the previous week's flight from Brisbane. On 29 January, Fiame announced that the country's nationwide lockdown would be lifted due to a lack of COVID-19 community transmissions. Workplaces and businesses were allowed to reopen while public gatherings were limited to 30 people. Only cargo flights were allowed in and out of Samoa. On 30 January, three new border cases were reported including a four-year-old child in quarantine; bringing the total number of positive cases to 30. Samoa remained on Alert Level 2, having emerged from the nationwide lockdown.

On 2 February, the Samoan government confirmed that a managed isolation breach occurred when a nurse and government driver left a managed isolation facility to visit an ATM. The Samoan government also confirmed that a nurse had tested positive for COVID-19, bringing the total number of positive cases in managed isolation to 31. On 18 March, Samoa reported 11 new cases including one community case reported the previous day. In response, the Samoan Cabinet activated its zoning policy as part of its National COVID-19 Plan; imposed Level 3 restrictions until 22 March. Under these restrictions, supermarkets, wholesale, small shops, pharmacies, fish and fresh produce markets, and restaurants were only allowed to operate between 8am to 2pm.

On 27 July, the Samoan Prime Minister Fiame Naomi Mataafa announced that Samoa had lifted its two-year national COVID-19 state of emergency ahead of its planned reopening of the border on 1 August 2022. She also confirmed that 93.6% of people aged 18 years and over, 92.4% of 12-17 year olds, and 91.4% of 5–11 year olds had been fully vaccinated against COVID-19. On 1 August, Samoa's border reopened to international travel. This announcement was welcomed by tourism operators, Samoa Tourism, and Samoa Airports Chief Silimana'i Ueta Solomona Jr. The first international flight to travel to Samoa following the lifting of border restrictions was a New Zealand Defence Force aircraft carrying a delegation of New Zealand political leaders, officials, civil society leaders, and journalists including then Prime Minister Jacinda Ardern.

== Statistics ==
=== New cases per day ===
View source data.

Cases by islands (as of 22 April 2022)
Island	Cases	Reference
Apolima	0	
Manono	5	
Savai'i	525	
Upolu	6,201	
3/4	6,731	

== See also ==
- COVID-19 pandemic in American Samoa
- COVID-19 pandemic in Oceania
