= Laʻauli Leuatea Schmidt =

Prime Minister of Samoa since 2025

The Honourable Susuga Laʻauli Leuatea Schmidt
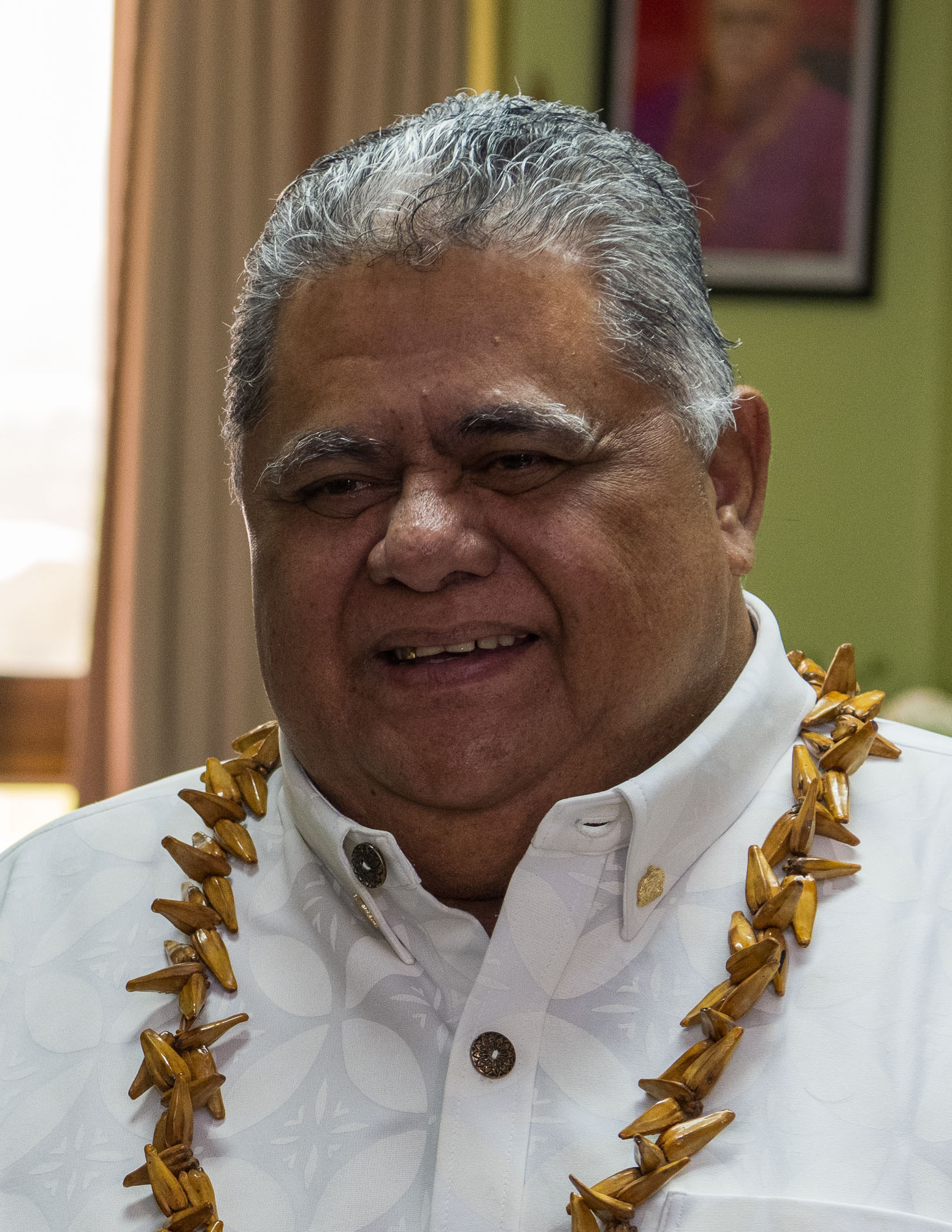
- Schmidt in 2023

8th Prime Minister of Samoa
- Incumbent
- Assumed office 16 September 2025
- O le Ao o le Malo: Tuimalealiʻifano Vaʻaletoʻa Sualauvi II
- Deputy: Toelupe Poumulinuku Onesemo; Mulipola Anarosa Ale Molioʻo
- Preceded by: Fiamē Naomi Mataʻafa

18th Commonwealth Chair-in-Office
- In office 16 September 2025 – 1 November 2026
- Preceded by: Fiamē Naomi Mataʻafa
- Succeeded by: Gaston Browne
Other offices held
Leader of Faʻatuatua i le Atua Samoa ua Tasi
Incumbent
Assumed office 15 January 2025
Deputy	Leota Laki Lamositele
Preceded by	Fiamē Naomi Mataʻafa
In office 30 July 2020 – 9 March 2021
Deputy	Olo Fiti Vaai
Preceded by	Position Established
Succeeded by	Fiamē Naomi Mataʻafa
Minister of Agriculture, Fisheries and Scientific Research
In office 24 May 2021 (Note: Disputed: 24 May 2021 – 23 July 2021) – 10 January 2025
Prime Minister	Fiamē Naomi Mataʻafa
Preceded by	Lopaoʻo Natanielu Mua
Succeeded by	Niuava Eti Malolo
In office 19 March 2016 – 22 August 2017
Prime Minister	Tuilaʻepa Saʻilele Malielegaoi
Preceded by	Le Mamea Ropati (Note: As Minister of Agriculture and Fisheries)
Succeeded by	Lopaoʻo Natanielu Mua
Deputy Leader of Faʻatuatua i le Atua Samoa ua Tasi
In office 9 March 2021 – 15 January 2025
Leader	Fiamē Naomi Mataʻafa
Preceded by	Olo Fiti Vaai
Succeeded by	Leota Laki Lamositele
Speaker of the Legislative Assembly of Samoa
In office 18 March 2011 – 16 March 2016
Preceded by	Tolofuaivalelei Falemoe Lei’ataua
Succeeded by	Toleafoa Faafisi

Member of the Samoan Parliament for Gagaʻifomauga No. 3
- Incumbent
- Assumed office 31 March 2006
- Preceded by: Vagana Peleiʻupu Tamate

Personal details
- Born: Leuatea Polataivao Fosi Schmidt; 14 April 1966 (age 60)
- Party: Faʻatuatua i le Atua Samoa ua Tasi (since 2020)
- Other political affiliations: Human Rights Protection Party (until 2020)

Susuga Laʻaulialemalietoa Leuatea Polataivao Fosi Schmidt (born 14 April 1966) is a Samoan politician and businessman who has served as the eighth prime minister of Samoa since 2025. He is a former speaker and deputy speaker of the Samoan Parliament. Schmidt is the Member of Parliament for the Gagaʻifomauga No. 3 constituency and is the founder and chairman of the Faʻatuatua i le Atua Samoa ua Tasi (FAST) party.

== Early life and political career ==
Schmidt is the son of former Government Minister and founding member of the Human Rights Protection Party (HRPP) Polataivao Fosi Schmidt, who was of partial German descent. He was first elected to the Legislative Assembly as a candidate for the HRPP at the 2006 election. From 2006 to 2011 he served as Deputy Speaker. He was re-elected at the 2011 election and served as Speaker from 2011 to 2016. He was again re-elected at the 2016 election and appointed to Cabinet as Minister of Agriculture, Fisheries and Scientific Research.

In August 2017, Schmidt resigned as Minister of Agriculture and Fisheries and remained Member of Parliament as he had a lengthy legal battle with HRPP MP Peseta Vaifou Tevaga. He was subsequently charged with more than a hundred counts of forgery and theft. He was acquitted of all charges in June 2020.

=== 2007 Nazi salute video ===
In October 2026, the Samoa Observer reported that Schmidt had performed a Nazi salute in a resurfaced video from a private family event in 2007, where he instructed 13 people to raise their hands and say the phrase "heil Hitler". He apologised for the incident, affirming that he condemns all forms of antisemitism, Nazism and racism.

== Departure from HRPP and by-election ==
In May 2020 Schmidt was sacked from the HRPP by Prime Minister Tuilaʻepa Saʻilele Malielegaoi after voting against proposed constitutional amendments. He subsequently announced he had resigned from the HRPP and that he would be forming a new political party to contest the 2021 election.

On 30 June 2020, the Parliamentary Privileges and Ethics Committee found that Schmidt had misled Parliament over the disputed price of a generator during a debate and recommended that he be suspended from Parliament for three months without pay. Schmidt apologised to the House and verbally resigned his seat. After some initial doubt, the verbal resignation was deemed to be effective, and a by-election was called.

On 30 July Schmidt registered the Faʻatuatua i le Atua Samoa ua Tasi (FAST) Party to contest in the 2021 Elections. He ran as a candidate for the party in the 2020 Gagaifomauga No. 3 byelection and was re-elected.

== Government ==
Schmidt was re-elected during the 2021 Samoan general election. On 24 May 2021 he was appointed Minister of Agriculture and Fisheries in the elected cabinet of Fiamē Naomi Mataʻafa. The appointment was disputed by the caretaker government. On 23 July 2021 the Court of Appeal ruled that the swearing-in ceremony was constitutional and binding, and that FAST had been the government since 24 May.

In January 2025 he was charged with 10 criminal offences, including harassment, making a false statement causing harm to a person's reputation, using insulting words to provoke a breach of the peace, conspiring to fabricate evidence and conspiring to pervert the course of justice. After refusing to resign he was sacked as a minister on 10 January. On 15 January Schmidt, acting as FAST chairman, expelled Mataʻafa, Deputy Prime Minister Tuala Iosefo Ponifasio, and three other cabinet ministers from the party. Schmidt was subsequently elected FAST leader, with Leota Laki Lamositele as his deputy.

=== Prime minister (since 2025) ===
During the 2025 snap election, Schmidt was re-elected in his Gaga‘ifomauga 3 constituency in a landslide, defeating Faʻaulusau Rosa Duffy-Stowers of the HRPP. FAST won 30 seats, allowing the party to form a government with Schmidt as prime minister. He assumed office on 16 September after the 18th Parliament was sworn in, becoming the eighth prime minister and only the third to be from Savaiʻi. Toelupe Poumulinuku Onesemo became deputy prime minister and, per an arrangement, and was set to hold the post until midway through the parliamentary term in 2028. Finance Minister Mulipola Anarosa Ale Molioʻo was expected to assume the deputy premiership thereafter. After Onesemo was convicted of bribery in 2026, however, Molioʻo instead became deputy prime minister on 26 May.

Shortly after taking office, Schmidt departed for Auckland, New Zealand, to receive medical treatment. His stay was initially planned to be for a week, but was extended on multiple occasions. Schmidt's injury was not specifically disclosed; however, on 17 October, Deputy Prime Minister Onesemo announced that Schmidt was "unable to stand". Schmidt held meetings in Auckland with the representatives of other nations, despite his government advising him not to do so whilst on medical leave, especially without the presence of a senior official from the ministry of foreign affairs or the ministry of the prime minister.

==== AI-enhanced images ====
Shortly after Onesemo's announcement, Schmidt released an image of a meeting with New Zealand Foreign Minister Winston Peters. Schmidt, however, had the photo altered by AI to make it appear as if he was sitting in an armchair, when he was actually in a wheelchair. Neither Schmidt nor his government commented on the image, while the New Zealand delegation indicated that it had been modified.

==== Media restrictions ====
Schmidt returned to Samoa on 15 November, after being abroad for nearly two months. Upon his return, journalists from the Samoa Observer, the country's sole daily newspaper, and the BBC attempted to visit him at his residence in Siusega to confirm his presence in Samoa; however, several of his supporters denied them entry. Two of Schmidt's supporters reportedly assaulted Samoa Observer editor Shavleen Chand while police officers were on site. Chand subsequently filed a police complaint. At a press conference on 17 November, Schmidt announced that the Samoa Observer would be barred from covering government affairs. He claimed the outlet had tarnished his image while he was abroad, and instructed his cabinet to ignore its inquiries. Schmidt also accused the journalists of breaching his privacy and demanded that they refrain from visiting his residence.

== Political views ==
Schmidt is a devout Christian and regularly emphasises Christianity as being part of Samoa's national identity. A staunch Christian Zionist, he has connected his support of Israel to his faith, pledging strong support for Israel and opening a Samoan embassy in Jerusalem. He is also described as having Christian nationalist and socially conservative views. Many of his supporters believe he was chosen by God to be Prime Minister of Samoa.

== Notes ==
Legislative Assembly of Samoa
Preceded by Vagana Peleiʻupu Tamate	Member of Parliament for Gagaʻifomauga No. 3; 2006–present	Incumbent
Preceded by Tolofuaivalelei Falemoe Leiʻataua	Deputy Speaker of the Legislative Assembly of Samoa; 2006–2011	Succeeded by Agafili Patisela Eteuati Tolovaa
Preceded by Tolofuaivalelei Falemoe Leiʻataua	Speaker of the Legislative Assembly of Samoa; 2011–2016	Succeeded by Leaupepe Toleafoa Faafisi
Political offices
Preceded by Le Mamea Ropati as Minister of Agriculture and Fisheries	Minister of Agriculture, Fisheries and Scientific Research; 2016–2017	Succeeded by Lopaoʻo Natanielu Mua
Preceded by Lopaoʻo Natanielu Mua	Minister of Agriculture, Fisheries and Scientific Research; 2021–2025	Succeeded by Niuava Eti Malolo
Preceded by Fiamē Naomi Mataʻafa	Prime Minister of Samoa; 2025–present	Incumbent
Party political offices
New political party	Leader of Faʻatuatua i le Atua Samoa ua Tasi; 2020–2021	Succeeded by Fiamē Naomi Mataʻafa
Preceded by Olo Fiti Vaai	Deputy Leader of Faʻatuatua i le Atua Samoa ua Tasi; 2021–2025	Succeeded by Leota Laki Lamositele
Preceded by Fiamē Naomi Mataʻafa	Leader of Faʻatuatua i le Atua Samoa ua Tasi; 2025–present	Incumbent
