= COVID-19 pandemic in American Samoa =

- Disease: COVID-19
- Pathogen: SARS-CoV-2
- Location: American Samoa
- First outbreak: Wuhan, Hubei, China
- Arrival date: November 9, 2020 (5 years, 9 months, 1 week and 1 day ago)
- Confirmed cases: 8,263
- Suspected cases: 0
- Recovered: 8,262
- Deaths: 34

The COVID-19 pandemic in American Samoa is part of the worldwide pandemic of coronavirus disease 2019 (COVID-19) caused by severe acute respiratory syndrome coronavirus 2 (SARS-CoV-2). The COVID-19 pandemic was confirmed to have reached the unincorporated United States territory of American Samoa on November 9, 2020.

== Background ==
On January 12, 2020, the World Health Organization (WHO) confirmed that a novel coronavirus was the cause of a respiratory illness in a cluster of people in Wuhan City, Hubei Province, China, which was reported to the WHO on December 31, 2019. The case fatality ratio for COVID-19 has been much lower than SARS of 2003, but the transmission has been significantly greater, with a significant total death toll.

== Timeline ==
Cases

Deaths

=== March 2020 ===
On March 6, the American Samoan government introduced new entry restrictions including restricting flight numbers and requiring travelers from Hawaii to spend 14 days in Hawaii and obtain a health clearance from health authorities. On March 11, a government task-force was set up to deal with the virus and quarantining measures have been put in place for incoming visitors. On March 14, half of the 210 passengers on a returning Hawaiian Airlines flight were required to self-quarantine at home. Following a trip to the US mainland, Governor Lolo Matalasi Moliga self-isolated as a precautionary measure on March 16.

On March 26, Iulogologo Joseph Pereira, executive assistant to the American Samoa Governor and the head of the territory's coronavirus task force, acknowledged that the territory did not have facilities to test samples of the COVID-19 virus, having to rely on testing facilities in Atlanta, Georgia.

=== April 2020 ===
On April 19, United States President Donald Trump declared that a major disaster existed in American Samoa, responding to a request for help from Governor Lolo Matalasi Moliga on April 13. This declaration makes the territory eligible for federal assistance to combat the spread of the coronavirus. The US Federal Emergency Management Agency has named its Regional 9 administrator Robert Fenton Junior as the Coordinating Officer for any federal recovery operations in American Samoa.

=== May 2020 ===
As of May 6, the US territory had still reported no cases.

=== November 2020 ===
On November 9, American Samoa reported its first three cases, who were crew members aboard the container ship Fesco Askold.

On November 18, the Department of Health, Port Administration and the Fesco Askold's owners reached an agreement to allow local stevedores to offload and load containers from the container vessel. According to Radio New Zealand, the Fesco Askold was scheduled to leave American Samoa on November 19.

=== December 2020 ===
On December 21, American Samoa started its COVID-19 vaccinations by vaccinating its health workers and first responders with the Pfizer vaccine. On the same day, another case was reported as a crew member aboard the container ship Coral Islander tested positive.

=== March 2021 ===
By March 6, 2021, nearly 24,000 COVID-19 vaccines had been administered in the territory. According to the Department of Health official's 's Aifili Dr John Tufa, this amounts to roughly 42% of American Samoa's eligible population.

=== April 2021 ===
On April 18, 2021, Governor Lemanu Peleti Mauga announced a positive case in quarantine on a man repatriated from Hawaii.

=== August 2021 ===
On August 13, 2021, the government of American Samoa made vaccination against COVID-19 mandatory for entry into the territory as soon as the FDA issued full approval, which it did for the Pfizer–BioNTech COVID-19 vaccine on August 23.

=== September 2021 ===
A sixth case (commonly reported as the first territorial case in the media, with cargo ship and previous quarantine cases excluded) was found in a group of travelers quarantining at their hotel on September 18. The infected person was a fully vaccinated resident who had returned from travel to Hawaii and the continental United States on the first commercial flight between Honolulu and Page Pago after service was restored. In reaction, the person was taken to another facility to isolate, and flights into the island were suspended indefinitely.

=== October 2021 ===
Two more cases (the third counted imported case, and the seventh and eight overall) were reported on October 2. They were fully vaccinated residents quarantining after returning on a flight from Honolulu on September 27. In response, the patients and three close contacts were put in isolation.

=== December 2021 ===
In late December 2021 it was reported that a total of 11 imported cases had been detected on the island, with no local transmission.

=== January 2022 ===
Six new cases were detected on January 13, 2022, from a Hawaiian Airlines flight.

As of January 31, 2022, 18 imported and no local cases had been found.

== See also ==
- COVID-19 pandemic in Samoa
