= White Sunday =

National holiday

- Observed by: Samoa and Tonga and Niue
- Date: Second Sunday in October
- 2025 date: October 12
- 2026 date: October 11
- 2027 date: October 10
- 2028 date: October 8
- Frequency: annual

White Sunday, (in the Samoan language Lotu Tamaiti, literally "Children's Service"), is a national holiday in Samoa falling on the second Sunday of October, with the Monday following a public holiday. It is also celebrated in American Samoa, Tokelau, Tonga and Niue.

The day is for parents and communities to acknowledge and celebrate childhood by hosting special programs during church services which include scriptural recitations, biblical story reenactments, and creative dance performances. Children receive gifts (often new clothing and/or school supplies) on White Sunday and are allowed privileges normally reserved for elders, such as being the first to be served food at family meal time.

== Observance ==
On White Sunday, Samoan women and children dress completely in white clothing. Some of them trim the clothes with the other two colours of the Samoan flag, red and blue. Men will wear white shirts with either white slacks or the traditional 'ie faitaga form of the lavalava. If a lavalava is worn it need not be white.

== Background ==
Some believe White Sunday to be a Christian adaptation of an indigenous pre-contact celebration of certain planting and harvesting seasons. Others assert that the holiday coincides with a family celebration that became widespread in the 1920s in commemoration of Samoans who succumbed to the influenza epidemic of 1919; this epidemic, introduced through the ambivalence of the New Zealand colonial administration, took the lives of a fifth to a quarter of the Samoan population, many of them children. White Sunday is a time to come together with brothers, sisters and even cousins to recite something together. It is a tradition in all the Protestant churches.

White Sunday (or Children's Sunday) was bought to Samoa in the nineteenth century by the London Missionary Society (LMS). During its annual Conference in May 1898 it was resolved to set up a special Sunday for children, and so the first such White Sunday was held on the last Sunday of June the same year 1898, which was celebrated in all the LMS churches in Samoa. During the International Sunday School Conference held in Rome in February 1909, it was resolved to make the third Sunday of October the International Children's Sunday, and so the Samoan White Sunday was changed from June to the third Sunday of October. Later on, this day was changed to the second Sunday of October,(as Mothers' Day is on the second Sunday in May and Fathers' Day is on the second Sunday in August). The centenary of White Sunday was celebrated in 1998 not only by Congregational Christian Church of Samoa (CCCS) churches in Samoa but also in CCCS churches in USA, Hawaii, Australia, New Zealand and American Samoa.

Today White Sunday is observed and celebrated by all Christian Churches in Samoa. For CCCS churches, most children are baptised on White Sunday. A special service is held on Saturday evening to prepare everyone - minister, children, parents and families - for White Sunday.

== Cultural references ==
New Zealand hip-hop artist Mareko has released an album named after White Sunday.
