= Kjeld Erik Brødsgaard =

Danish computer scientist

- Education: Aarhus University; University of Copenhagen; Peking University; Nanjing University
- Scientific career
- Fields: Economics, History, Politics
- Workplaces: University of Copenhagen; Peking University; East Asian Institute; Copenhagen Business School

Kjeld Erik Brødsgaard is a Danish historian and academic. He is the Professor of China Studies at the Department of International Economics and Management and Director of the China Policy Program at Copenhagen Business School. He is an internationally recognized authority on China's political economy, including state-Party-business relations and the role of the Chinese Communist Party in the current modernization process.

== Education ==
Kjeld Erik Brødsgaard obtained MA degree in History in 1978 from Aarhus University and the University of Copenhagen. He studied in Peking University (1978-1979), Nanjing University (1982-1983) and Stanford University (1980-1981). In 1990, Brødsgaard obtained his Ph.D. in Modern Chinese Studies from the University of Copenhagen after successfully defending of a thesis titled "Readjustment and Reform in the Chinese Economy, 1953-86".

== Career ==
=== Academic career ===
From 1984 to 1986, Kjeld Erik Brødsgaard was a Carlsberg Foundation Research Fellow. In 1986, he was appointed Assistant Professor in Third World Studies at the East Asian Institute of the University of Copenhagen, while also serving as director of the university's Centre for East and Southeast Asian Studies. From 1990-2003, he was Associate Professor of Modern East Asian History at Copenhagen University. In 2003 he moved to Copenhagen Business School (CBS) to become Professor of International Business in Asia/China and to head the Asia Research Centre. He has held visiting professorships at, among others, Peking University, National University of Singapore and Academia Sinica.

=== Editorial work ===
Kjeld Erik Brødsgaard serves on many editorial boards, including China: An International Journal; Journal of Current Chinese Affairs; Governance and Public Policy in China; and China Report.

He is the founder and chief editor of the Copenhagen Journal of Asian Studies.

== Publications ==
- Kina i Moderne Tid - Samfund, Økonomi og Politik (2019)
- From Accelerated Accumulation to Socialist Market Economy in China (2017)
- Critical Readings on the Chinese Communist Party, 4. vols (2017)
- Chinese Politics as Fragmented Authoritarianism (2017)
- Globalization and Public Sector Reform in China (2014)
- Hainan - State, Society and Business in a Chinese Province (2009 and 2012)
- The Chinese Communist Party in Reform (with Zheng Yongnian) (2006 and 2009)
- Bring the Party Back in: How China is Governed (with Zheng Yongnian) (2004)
- State Capacity in East Asia (with Suan Yong) (2000 and 2003)
- Reconstructing Twentieth Century China (with David Strand) (1998)
- Kina efter Deng (1998)
