= Chinese people in Samoa =

Chinese in Samoa
Regions with significant populations
- Atuʻu, Pago Pago, American Samoa • Apia, Samoa
- Samoa: 620 (2015)
- American Samoa: 407 Chinese-born (2010)

Languages
- English, Samoan, Cantonese, Mandarin

Religion
- Congregationalist, Roman Catholic, Buddhism, Taoism and Confucianism

Related ethnic groups
- Samoans, Chinese

The majority of Chinese nationals currently residing in southwestern Pacific island nation of Samoa are businessmen and labourers and there are at least 30,000 people in the country who are of mixed Samoan and Chinese descent, although they are classified as ethnic Samoans in official census. Around the world, about 25% of all Samoans claim Chinese ancestry. Nearly all Chinese nationals in Samoa reside within Apia; neighbouring American Samoa, also has a small population of Chinese expatriates.

== History ==
Historical records of Chinese settlement dates back to at least the 1870s. Two Chinese sailors under the command of Bully Hayes were based there for two years, and one of them settled down in 1876 and married a Samoan wife. A few Chinese traders also settled in Samoa and raised local families, and maintained close ties with Samoa's paramount chief, Malietoa Laupepa. In 1880, Malietoa issued a subsequent ban on people of Chinese descent from settling in Samoa. Three years after Western Samoa came under German rule in 1900, the colonial governor Wilhelm Solf lifted Malietoa's ban and shipped in Chinese labourers from 1903 onwards. Chinese labourers reportedly complained of tough working punishments as well as brutal physical punishments which they had to face, and these reports prompted the provincial governor of Canton to stop sending Chinese labourers to the German colonies.

When New Zealand gained control of Samoa after the First World War, the system of indentured labour affecting many Chinese workers was reformed, removing corporal punishments and letting the workers change employers. However, those employers were no longer responsible for more than minimal board, and if fired the workers could quickly become imprisoned for vagrancy.

Chinese immigrants were almost entirely men, and most of the labourers took Samoan women as wives and by 1918 offspring of Chinese-Samoan descent were a visible minority, although smaller in terms of population compared to offspring of European (particularly German) and Samoan descent. This eventually led to a ban in 1931 that prohibited Chinese men from interacting with Samoan women on all grounds. By the end of World War II only 295 Chinese remained, all of whom had either taken Samoan wives or were unmarried. Many Chinese labourers had since returned to China or remained in Samoa with their families.

In 1994, China provided financial assistance to fund the construction of the government office building in Apia. More recently the Chinese government has funded various other Samoan government construction projects. Aʻeau Peniamina, deputy leader of the Samoa Democratic United Party, caused a minor controversy in January 2005 when he remarked that "there are too many Chinese in the country". Hans Joachim Keil III, the Minister of Tourism, who was of part-Chinese descent, promptly rebutted Peniamina's remarks.

Chinese-Samoans are well represented in the civil service, and China established diplomatic relations with Samoa in November 1975. Chinese-Samoans are especially well represented in the retail, import-export, and restaurant sectors, notably in Apia.

== Language ==
The majority of the Chinese indentured labourers came from the Guangdong province and generally spoke Cantonese or Hakka as their primary language. However, their descendants in Samoa have adopted Samoan and English as their mother tongues, while Cantonese is still reportedly spoken by a few elderly people. Since the 1980s, the overwhelming majority of Chinese immigrants and enterprises are derived from other regions in China where Mandarin Chinese is spoken.

== Names ==
Many people of Chinese descent in Samoa took their fathers' first names as their surnames, rather than their actual Chinese surnames due to Chinese personal naming convention where the family name is written first and the given name next. Many of these names are of Cantonese origin, as the majority of the Chinese who settled in Samoa came from Taishan and Panyu. Chinese-Samoans often have surnames that start with "Ah," "Po," or "Ho" and common examples of Chinese-Samoan families include Ah Seu, Ah Kuoi, Ah Van, Ah Mu (of whom some descendants have adopted the name "Rivers"), Po Ching, Ah You, Ho Ching, Ah Kam, Ah Liki, Ah Sam, Ah Mau, Ah Ching, Ah Fong, Ah Loe and Ah Wong. The retention of the "Ah" prefix is also common in Chinese-Hawaiian surnames, such as Akina, Ahuna, Akee, Akiona and Akaka. The practice stems from the Cantonese word "ah" (阿) used before proper names when respectfully addressing family members – as in "ah-po" (阿婆), maternal grandmother; "ah-gong" (阿公), maternal grandfather; "ah-ma" (阿嫲), paternal grandmother, etc. Likewise, some European-Samoan names begin with "Misi," the Samoan transliteration of "Mister" (Mr.) – as in Misiluki ("Mr. Luke"), Misimua/Misimoa ("Mr. Moors"), Misipaulo ("Mr. Paul"), Misitea ("Mr. Stair"), and Misikea ("Mr. Gurr")

== Notable Samoans of Chinese descent ==
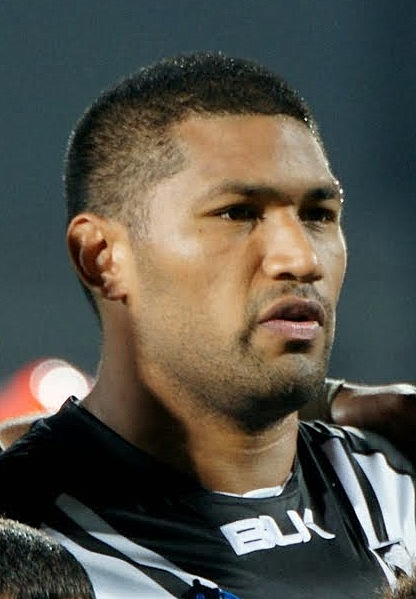
Frank-Paul Nu'uausala

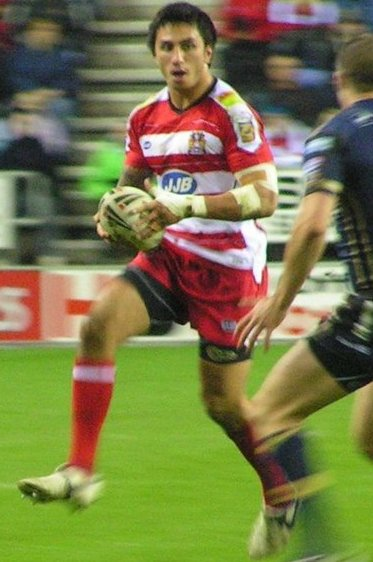
Harrison Hansen

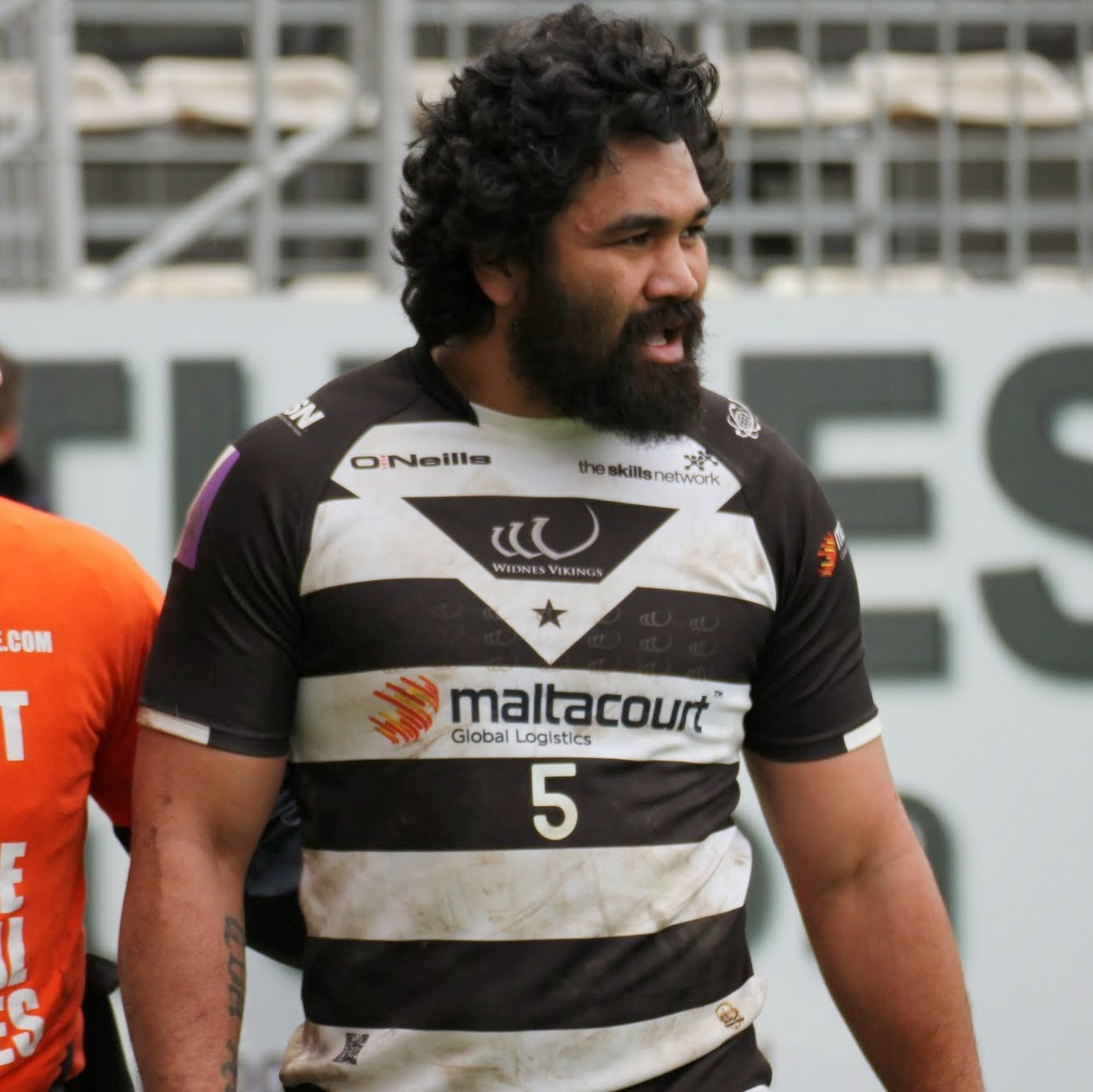
Patrick Ah Van

- See Category:Samoan people of Chinese descent
- Eveni Tafiti, Multicultural Counselor of Weber State University
- Verona Lovel Parker, Miss Samoa 1997
- Muagututagata Peter Ah Him, Deputy Prime Minister of Samoa
- Papaliitele Niko Lee Hang, Minister of Communication and Information Technology and member of 15th Samoan Parliament
- Harrison Hansen, New Zealand rugby league footballer
- Patrick Ah Van, New Zealand rugby league footballer
- Frank-Paul Nu'uausala, New Zealand rugby league footballer
- Brian To’o, Australian rugby league footballer
- Hans Keil, Samoan cabinet minister
- Leeson Ah Mau, New Zealand rugby league footballer
- Michael Chee-Kam, New Zealand rugby league footballer

== Bibliography ==
- Scot Barmé (2006). WorldMark Encyclopedia of The Nations–Asia and Oceania (Twelfth ed.). Thomson Gale. ISBN 1-4144-1093-X.
- Crocombe, R. G., Asia in the Pacific Islands: Replacing the West, 2007, ISBN 982-02-0388-0
- Pan, Lynn, The Encyclopedia of the Chinese Overseas, Harvard University Press, 1999, ISBN 0-674-25210-1
- Tu'u'u, Misilugi Tulifau Tofaeono, History of Samoa Islands: Supremacy & Legacy of the Malietoa, Tuga'ula Publication, 2002, ISBN 0-9582199-1-5
- Tom, Nancy Y.W. The Chinese in Western Samoa 1975–1985. Apia: Western Samoan Historical and Cultural Trust
