= September 2026 Vaimauga 3 by-election =

- 18 September 2026
	First party	Second party
Candidate	Nonu William Mauia	Vaiofuaiupoulu Chris Faʻaʻofo
Party	FAST	HRPP
Popular vote	1,138	1,007
Percentage	32.18%	28.48%
	Third party	Fourth party
Candidate	Puaʻalatamai Filemoni Filemoni	Soʻoialo Feetau Soʻoialo
Party	FAST	Independent
Popular vote	935	456
Percentage	26.44%	12.90%
MP before election
Lautimuia Uelese Vaʻai
Independent
Elected MP
Nonu William Mauia
FAST

A by-election to the Legislative Assembly of Samoa was held in the Vaimauga 3 constituency on 18 September 2026. The by-election was triggered after the previous member, Lautimuia Uelese Vaʻai, was convicted of election bribery. This was the third poll to be held in Vaimauga 3 in just over a year, following another by-election in May and the 2025 snap election. Nonu William Mauia of the Faʻatuatua i le Atua Samoa ua Tasi (FAST) party won the seat with 32% of the vote, while Vaiofuaiupoulu Chris Faʻaʻofo of the Human Rights Protection Party (HRPP) placed second with 28%.

== Background ==
The previous by-election, held on 1 May 2026, was triggered after the incumbent representative, Taioaliʻiseu Fiti Aimaʻasu, resigned from parliament to defect from the opposition HRPP to the governing FAST party. Members of parliament in Samoa are required to vacate their seats if they switch their party affiliations during a parliamentary term. Aima‘asu had claimed the seat from Finance Minister Lautimuia Uelese Vaʻai in the August 2025 snap election. Aimaʻasu lost the May by-election in a landslide to his predecessor, who ran as an independent. He subsequently filed an electoral petition against Va‘ai after the by-election, accusing him of bribery, while Vaʻai submitted a counter-petition. The court found both Aimaʻasu and Vaʻai guilty on 29 July, sending the constituency back to its fifth election in five years.

== Electoral system ==
Elections to all 51 of the directly elected seats in the Legislative Assembly are conducted through the first-past-the-post voting system. Candidates are required to hold a matai title, be at least 21 years old, and have resided in Samoa for a minimum of three years before the nomination date. Individuals convicted of a crime in Samoa or any other country within the previous eight years, and people with a mental illness, were ineligible to stand as candidates. Civil servants were permitted to run as long as they resigned from their positions. Should civil servants fail to do so, the date of filing their candidacy is, by law, deemed to be the point when they relinquish their role.

Universal Suffrage took effect in 1991, permitting all Samoan citizens aged 21 and over the right to vote. Compulsory voting and mandatory voter registration were in place for the by-election. Electors who failed to vote were required to pay 100 tālā, while eligible individuals who did not register on the electoral roll before the deadline were liable to pay a 2000 tālā fine. As Samoa did not employ overseas voting at the time of the by-election, electors enrolled in the Vaimauga 3 constituency were required to be present in the country to vote.

== Candidates ==
Four candidates contested the by-election; the HRPP nominated Vaiofuaiupoulu Chris Faʻaʻofo. FAST fielded two candidates: Puaʻalatamai Filemoni Filemoni, who also ran in the May by-election as an independent, and Nonu William Mauia, who previously contested the seat at the 2025 general election. Soʻoialo Feetau Soʻoialo was the only candidate to run as an independent. Shortly before registering his candidacy, the Office of the Attorney-General absolved Faʻaʻofo of criminal suspicion, with the police declining to press charges him due to insufficient evidence.

== Conduct ==
Electoral Commissioner Toleafoa Tuiafelolo Stanley issued the election writ on 21 August, disclosing the by-election date. The period for candidate nominations commenced and concluded on 28 August, while contestants had until 4 September to withdraw their candidacies if they intended to do so. Pre-polling occurred on 16 September, two days before the by-election. The electoral commissioner said polling day "went well", with no reported issues. The return of the writ is expected for 21 September.

== Results ==
In the preliminary count, Mauia led with 1,085 votes, 147 ahead of Faʻaʻofo, who had received 938. Filemoni was in third place with 888 votes, followed by Soʻoialo, who had garnered 428. Mauia's secured a narrow victory in the final count with 1,138 votes, while Faʻaʻofo remained second with 1,007. Filemoni finished with 935 votes and Soʻoialo placed fourth with 456.

Candidate	Party	Votes	%
Nonu William Mauia	Faʻatuatua i le Atua Samoa ua Tasi	1,138	32.18
Vaiofuaiupoulu Chris Faʻaʻofo	Human Rights Protection Party	1,007	28.48
Puaʻalatamai Filemoni Filemoni	Faʻatuatua i le Atua Samoa ua Tasi	935	26.44
Soʻoialo Feetau Soʻoialo	Independent	456	12.90
Total		3,536	100.00
Source: Samoa Observer
