= Zheng Yongnian =

Chinese political scientist (born 1962)

- 郑永年
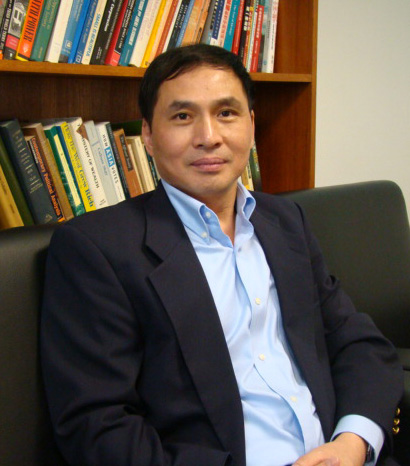
- Zheng in 2009
- Born: February 11, 1962 (age 64); Yuyao, Zhejiang, China
- Occupation: political scientist
- Known for: Commentary on the Politics of the People's Republic of China

Chinese name
- Traditional Chinese: 鄭永年
- Simplified Chinese: 郑永年
Transcriptions

Zheng Yongnian (Chinese: 郑永年; born 1962) is a Chinese political scientist and political commentator who has studied and written on contemporary China and especially on Chinese politics. Zheng joined the Chinese University of Hong Kong, Shenzhen in September 2020 and was appointed Director of the Advanced Institute of Global and Contemporary China Studies. He became the founding dean of the university's School of Public Policy in September 2024. He was a professor and director of the East Asian Institute, National University of Singapore from 2008 until his resignation in 2020 amid alleged incidents of sexual misconduct.

== Education and career ==
Zheng was born in Yuyao, Ningbo, Zhejiang province, China in 1962. After completing his secondary education in Yuyao, he moved to Peking University for his undergraduate and master's studies in political science. After his graduation from Peking University in 1988, he worked for two years as assistant professor in the Department of Politics and Public Administration at Peking University. Later, he studied at Princeton University, in the United States between 1990 and 1995 and obtained PhD in political science in 1995.

After a two-year term at Harvard as SSRC-MacArthur Fellow in International Peace and Security, Zheng moved to the newly founded East Asian Institute in Singapore as a research fellow (1997-2002) and later a senior research fellow (2002-2005). In 2005, he was appointed full professor and founding Research Director of the China Policy Institute at the University of Nottingham, United Kingdom. In July 2008, he succeeded Prof. Dali Yang and has since served as director of the East Asian Institute, a Singaporean think tank under a statute of the National University of Singapore. Zheng also serves as advisor to independent think tank Longus Research Institute, giving talks and contributing essays to their Longus Review.

Zheng is a co-editor of China: An International Journal, East Asian Policy and Series on Contemporary China published by World Scientific in Singapore and editor of the China Policy Series published by Routledge.

== Academic work ==
Zheng's academic works are mainly on politics of the People's Republic of China. His earlier works in the United States, including the PhD thesis in Princeton and post-doctoral research at Harvard, dealt with China's central-local relations and state-society interactions in Chinese nationalism. Since the late 1990s, his research topics have included the impact of globalization and information technology on Chinese politics and government.

In his 2010 book, The Chinese Communist Party as Organizational Emperor, Zheng argues that the Chinese Communist Party is not a political party in the usual sense of the word but rather an organizational form of traditional institution of the Emperor, similar to an organizational form of the Machiavellian prince à la Gramsci. According to an interview with Chinese journal Nanfengchuang, his current works in progress include a study on the structure of China's political economy and the nature of the modern Chinese polity as non-nation state.

== Political commentary ==
Since the 2000s, Zheng has been a columnist, writing weekly commentaries on China for Hong Kong Economic Journal (until 2004) and the Lianhe Zaobao (since 2002). His weekly commentaries featured a broad range of critical issues in contemporary China's political, economic, social and cultural development. In these commentaries he consistently argues for gradual reforms in China's social, economic and political lives. In the recent China Model debate, he takes the stand that while China definitely has a model of its own consistent and continuous with its historical patterns of development, the model needs constant reforms to avoid systemic crisis. As an internationally recognized authority on Chinese politics, he was frequently consulted and quoted by The New York Times on recent developments in China's domestic politics in 2012, an eventful year of the Chinese Communist Party's power transition. Besides being a columnist, he also appeared on TV programs. In the 2006 CCTV documentary The Rise of Great Nations, he was quoted to have expressed the view that the strength of a Great Power lies within its domestic institutions, its external powers merely reflecting an extension of its domestic institutions.

In September 2022, Zheng criticized Chinese conservatives who defended the "closed-door policy" during the Ming and Qing dynasties and insists there is no reason to change China's "reform and opening-up" policy.

== Alleged sexual misconduct ==
In August 2020, a staff member at the East Asian Institute (EAI) of the National University of Singapore (NUS) accused Zheng of sexual harassment early as May 2018. The accuser, who identified herself as "Charlotte" on Twitter, reported Zheng to the police in May 2019 "after a year's struggle." According to the accuser, a warning for "offence for Outrage of Modesty" was given to Zheng in May 2020. She also claimed that the EAI was well aware of Zheng's alleged behavior, but "[pretended] not to know" and used "bullying and retaliation" against her.

In early September 2020, the NUS confirmed that Zheng had already resigned from the EAI amid the allegation of sexual misconduct and was granted leave until the expiry of his contract later in the month. Zheng later denied the accusation, along with another alleged incident of sexual misconduct, via his attorney.

In November 2020, the NUS determined that Zheng had behaved indecently with a subordinate by touching her without her consent during a work meeting. In a statement issued on November 17, the NUS noted that Zheng's behavior was "inappropriate in a professional setting" and had breached the university's code of conduct for staff. The university said that they "became aware" of the allegations in May 2019 and suspended Zheng on May 20 that year. Zheng would have been given a written warning accordingly, but since he had already resigned, the NUS recorded the outcome of its internal review in its staff records.

== English-language publications ==
- Singapore-China Relations: 50 Years. (ed. with Liang Fook Lye) (World Scientific Series on Singapore's 50 Years of Nation-Building) NJ: World Scientific, 2016
- Contemporary China: A History Since 1978 (Blackwell History of the Contemporary World) . Hoboken, NJ: Wiley-Blackwell, 2013
- Hong Kong Under Chinese Rule: Economic Integration and Political Gridlock. (ed. with Chiew Ping Yew) NJ: World Scientific, 2013
- China: Development and Governance. (ed. with Gungwu Wang) NJ: World Scientific, 2012
- East Asia: Developments and Challenges. (ed. with Liang Fook Lye) (Series on Contemporary China) NJ: World Scientific, 2012
- Goh Keng Swee on China: Selected Essays. (ed. with John Wong) NJ: World Scientific, 2012
- Wang Gungwu: Educator and Scholar. (ed. with Kok Khoo Phua) NJ: World Scientific, 2012
- China and the Global Economic Crisis. (ed. with Sarah Y Tong) (Series on Contemporary China) NJ: World Scientific, 2010
- The Chinese Communist Party as Organizational Emperor: Culture, Reproduction and Transformation. London and New York: Routledge, 2010
- China and International Relations: The Chinese View and the Contribution of Wang Gungwu. (edited). London: Routledge, 2010
- China's Opening Society: The Non-State Sector and Governance. (ed. with Joseph Fewsmith) London: Routledge, 2009.
- China's Information and Communications Technology Revolution: Social Changes and State Responses London: Routledge, 2009
- Politics of Modern China (in 4 volumes) (ed. with Lu Yiyi and Lynn White), London and New York: Routledge, 2009
- China in the New International Order (ed. with Wang Gungwu), London: Routledge, 2008
- Technological Empowerment: The Internet, the State and Society in China. Stanford, CA: Stanford University Press, 2008
- De Facto Federalism in China: Reforms and Dynamics of Central-Local Relations (Series on Contemporary China). NJ: World Scientific, 2007
- The Communist Party in Reform (ed. with Kjeld Erik Brodsgaad), New York and London: Routledge, 2006
- Globalization and State Transformation in China. Cambridge: Cambridge University Press, 2004 (cloth and paper editions). (This book is also in Chinese language.)
- Will China Become Democratic? Elite, Class, and Regime Transition. Singapore, London and New York: Eastern Universities Press, 2004
- Discovering Chinese Nationalism in China: Modernization, Identity, and International Relations. Cambridge: Cambridge University Press, 1999 (cloth and paper editions) (This book is now also in Korean language.)
