= ACRC =

ACRC may refer to:

- Acidic repeat-containing protein
- Anti-Corruption and Civil Rights Commission in South Korea
- Asian Communication Resource Centre at Nanyang Technological University, Singapore
- Atlantic City Race Course
- The Andalusia and Conecuh Railroad; see Conecuh Valley Railroad, in Alabama
