= Ng Chin-Keong =

- 吳振強
- Occupations: Historian, professor

Academic background
- Education: Nanyang University (B.A.); University of Wisconsin–Madison (M.A.); Australian National University (Ph.D.)
- Doctoral advisor: Wang Gungwu

Academic work
- Main interests: Chinese history, economic history of China

Ng Chin-Keong (simplified Chinese: 吴振强; traditional Chinese: 吳振強) is a former Professor of Chinese History at the National University of Singapore until his retirement in 2006. He was also the Director of the Chinese Heritage Centre between 2004 and 2006.

Ng was born in Singapore and obtained his B.A. in history from the Nanyang University. After working as a teacher for several years, he completed his M.A. from the University of Wisconsin–Madison and his Ph.D. in Chinese history at the Australian National University where he was a student of Wang Gungwu.

== Selected publications ==
- Boundaries and Beyond: China's Maritime Southeast in Late Imperial Times (Singapore: NUS Press, 2017).
- Chinese and Indian Business: Historical Antecedents (Co-edited) (Leiden: Brill, 2009).
- Maritime China in Transition, 1750-1850. (Co-edited) (Wiesbaden: Harrassowitz Verlag, 2004).
- Trade and Society: The Amoy Network on the China Coast, 1683-1735 (Singapore: Singapore University Press, 1983).
- The Chinese in Riau: A Community on an Unstable and Restrictive Frontier (Singapore: Institute of Humanities and Social Sciences, College of Graduate Studies, Nanyang University, 1976).
- The Stormy Months between 5th August 1973 and 15th January 1974 in Indonesia: The Issues and Agitations (Singapore: Institute of Humanities and Social Sciences, College of Graduate Studies, Nanyang University, 1976).
- Xinjiapo Huaqun Shilunji 新加坡華族史論集 (Singapore: Nanyang Daxue Biyesheng Xuehui, 1972).
- Dongnanya Shigang 東南亞史綱 (Singapore: Qingnian Shuju, 1966).
