= Wang Gungwu bibliography =

The following is a list of works by or about the historian Wang Gungwu, an Australian historian, sinologist, and writer specialising in the history of China and Southeast Asia.

== Books ==
- Wang Gungwu (1977). China and the World since 1949: The Impact of Independence, Modernity, and Revolution. New York: St. Martin's Press.
- Wang Gungwu; Zheng, Yongnian, eds. (2001). Reform, Legitimacy and Dilemmas: China's Politics and Society. World Scientific.
- Wang Gungwu (2002). The Chinese overseas : from earthbound China to the quest for autonomy. The 1997 Edwin O. Reischauer Lectures. Harvard University Press.
- Wang Gungwu; Zheng, Yongnian, eds. (2003). Damage Control: The Chinese Communist Party in the Jiang Zemin Era. Singapore: Eastern Universities Press.
- Wang Gungwu; de Crespigny, Rafe; de Rachewiltz, Igor, eds. (2003). Sino-Asiatica: Papers dedicated to Professor Liu Ts'un-yan on the occasion of his eighty-fifth birthday. Canberra: Faculty of Asian Studies, Australian National University.
- Wang Gungwu; Abrams, Irwin, eds. (2003). The Iraq War and Its Consequences: Thoughts of Nobel Peace Laureates and Eminent Scholars. World Scientific.
- Wang Gungwu (2003). Anglo-Chinese encounters since 1800 : war, trade, science and governance. Cambridge: Cambridge University Press.
- Wang Gungwu; Ng, Chin-keong, eds. (2004). Maritime China in Transition, 1750–1850. Wiesbaden: Harrassowitz Verlag.
- Benton, Gregor; Liu, Hong, eds. (2004). Diasporic Chinese Ventures: The Life and Work of Wang Gungwu. London: Routledge.
- Wang Gungwu (2005). 移民及兴起的中国 (Essays on Migrants and China's Rise. World Scientific.
- Wang Gungwu; Wong, John, eds. (2007). Interpreting China's Development. World Scientific.
- Wang Gungwu (2007). 中華文明と中国のゆくえ (Chinese Civilization and China's Position). The Ishizaka Lectures 2005. Translated by Kato, Mikio. Tokyo: Iwanami Shoten.
- Wang Gungwu; Zheng, Yongnian, eds. (2012). China: Development and Governance. World Scientific. doi:10.1142/8606. ISBN 978-981-4425-83-4.
- Wang Gungwu (2014). Another China Cycle: Committing to Reform. World Scientific. doi:10.1142/8824. ISBN 978-981-4508-91-9.
- Wang Gungwu (2018). Home is not here. Singapore: NUS Press/Ridge Books.
- Wang Gungwu & Margaret Wang (2020). Home is where we are. Singapore: NUS Press/Ridge Books.
