= 2023 Vaimauga 3 by-election =

- 24 February 2023
- Turnout: 57.25%
	First party	Second party
Candidate	Lautimuia Uelese Vaʻai	Samau Leatigagaeono Timani
Party	FAST	HRPP
Popular vote	1,531	1,082
Percentage	56.31%	39.79%
Swing	▲9.51pp	▼12.31pp
MP before election
Tapunuu Niko Lee Hang
HRPP
Elected MP
Lautimuia Uelese Vaʻai
FAST

A by-election was held in the Vaimauga 3 constituency in Samoa on 24 February 2023. The by-election was triggered by the death of the incumbent member of parliament Tapunuu Niko Lee Hang of the Human Rights Protection Party (HRPP), in November 2022. A constituency widely considered an HRPP stronghold, former shipping executive Lautimuia Uelese Vaʻai of the ruling Faʻatuatua i le Atua Samoa ua Tasi (FAST) party won the by-election with 56%. He defeated Samau Leatigagaeono Timani of the opposition HRPP, who obtained 39%, and independent candidate Feagaimaaliʻi Bruce Toomalatai who garnered 3%.

== Background ==
The 2021 general election and subsequent constitutional crisis saw the newly founded FAST party unseat the HRPP from power, which had governed Samoa for almost four decades. The Vaimauga 3 constituency was first contested at this election. Tapunuʻu Niko Lee Hang of the HRPP, a long-time member of parliament and cabinet minister, won the new seat, obtaining 51% of the vote. He defeated the FAST party's Veatauia Faʻatasi Puleiata, who received 46%, while Feagaimaliʻi Bruce Utaileuo, the Samoa First Party candidate, placed third with 2%. Much of the constituency's electorate had typically favoured the HRPP in previous elections. Tapunuʻu died on 29 November 2022, triggering a by-election in the constituency.

== Candidates and campaign ==
Three candidates qualified to contest the by-election: former Samoa First Party leader Feagaimaaliʻi Bruce Toomalatai as an independent, former Samoa Shipping Corporation general manager and nephew of former prime minister Vaʻai Kolone, Lautimuia Uelese Vaʻai of the governing FAST party and Samau Leatigagaeono Timani of the opposition HRPP. Businesswoman Tupuola Theresa Finau was unable to run due to her village being unrecognised by the government.

=== Lautimuia Uelese Vaʻai ===
Lautimuia Uelese Vaʻai, who unsuccessfully contested the 2016 general election, resigned from his position as chief executive of the Samoa Shipping Corporation before the poll. Lautimuia campaigned on a platform emphasising education, employment and business, citing that most residents of the urban Vaimauga 3 constituency reside on freehold real estate and depend on employment businesses.

=== Feagaimaaliʻi Bruce Toomalatai ===
Feagaimaaliʻi criticised the allocation of land in the constituency for the extension of a local dam, which he claimed risked damaging the property of constituents residing in flat low, elevation areas. The independent candidate also expressed dissatisfaction with the amount of funding the Vaimauga 3 development committee received, which was WS$150,000, which he believed was inadequate. Feagaimaaliʻi called for an increase in funding to boost programs that help combat the rising cost of living.

== Conduct ==
=== Pre-polling ===
Pre-polling for early voters occurred on 22 February and the polls on that day were open from 9:00 to 16:00 local time (UTC+13:00). Voters were required to apply to cast an early vote, if they wished to do so. A total of 170 individuals were registered for the pre-poll, which included healthcare workers, police officers and voters with a disability. The electoral commission assured early voters that a failure to not vote on the pre-polling day would not disqualify them from casting their ballots on the day of the by-election. Turnout on the day of pre-polling saw 122 individuals cast an early vote.

=== Election day ===
On by-election day, polling stations were open from 8:00 to 15:00 (UTC+13). The electoral commission set up a voting booth in Salelologa for voters in Savaiʻi on the polling day. Polling officials provided a mobile voting service for voters unable to travel to polling booths. Voting was compulsory, and registered individuals who failed to vote faced a WS$100 fine. The electoral commission warned candidates and voters not to engage in illegal practices such as bribery and treating and reminded participants that candidates directly transporting electors was unlawful.

== Results ==
The preliminary count showed FAST candidate Lautimuia Uelese Vaʻai to have won. Despite the enforcement of compulsory voting, only 2,737 of the constituency's 4,781 registered voters participated in the by-election. In the final count, Lautimuia's majority increased to 1,531 votes, confirming his victory, while the HRPP's Samau Leatigagaeono Timani received 1,082. Independent candidate Feagaimaaliʻi Bruce Toomalatai placed a distant third with 106 votes. Lautimuia's victory was notable due to the constituency's reputation as an HRPP stronghold, and his win increased FAST's parliamentary majority to 32 seats.

Candidate	Party	Votes	%
Lautimuia Uelese Vaʻai	Faʻatuatua i le Atua Samoa ua Tasi	1,531	56.31
Samau Leatigagaeono Timani	Human Rights Protection Party	1,082	39.79
Feagaimaaliʻi Bruce Toomalatai	Independent	106	3.90
Total		2,719	100.00
Valid votes		2,719	99.34
Invalid/blank votes		18	0.66
Total votes		2,737	100.00
Registered voters/turnout		4,781	57.25
Source: Talamua Online

== Aftermath ==
Lautimuia Uelese Vaʻai was sworn in as a member of parliament by the speaker on 7 March. Shortly after the election, Samau Leatigagaeono Timani filed an electoral petition against the newly elected FAST MP, accusing him of bribery and treating; Lautimuia subsequently filed a counter-petition. On 12 May, the Supreme Court dismissed both cases, citing a lack of evidence, which guaranteed the seat for FAST.
