= Huang Jianli =

Historian of China

Huang Jianli (simplified Chinese: 黄坚立; traditional Chinese: 黃堅立) (born January 1956) is a retired Associate Professor of Chinese History at the National University of Singapore. He was a research associate at the East Asian Institute and Invited Senior Research Fellow at the Centre for Chinese Language and Culture, Nanyang Technological University. Huang was the 2011 Lee Kong Chian NUS-Stanford Distinguished Fellow on Southeast Asia.

== Biography ==
Huang was born in 1956 in Singapore as the eldest child in a third-generation migrant family. He completed his BA (Hons) in History and Economics in the National University of Singapore in 1981. Huang wrote his honours thesis on the 1911 Revolution under the supervision of the late Professor Hsiao Ch'i-Ch'ing. Subsequently, he received a Commonwealth Scholarship to pursue his PhD in Modern Chinese History at the Australian National University. He completed his dissertation entitled "Management of Student Political Activism in China: The Guomindang Policy, 1927–1945" under the supervision of Professor Wang Gungwu. After completing his doctoral studies in 1987, he returned to teach at the National University of Singapore (NUS). At NUS, he has served as the deputy head of the Department of History (2001–2004), academic convenor of the China Studies Minor Programme (2005–2008) and chair of the History Undergraduate Curriculum Committee (2007–2009). He also serves in the editorial board of China: An International Journal, Journal of Southeast Asian Studies and International Journal of Diasporic Chinese Studies. Huang served as the deputy director of NUS's Asia Research Institute from 2013 to 2017.

== Research ==
Huang's research interests include party policies on student politics in China, 1920s–1940s; local self-government in wartime Chongqing, 1937–1945; postwar Singapore Chinese community; Sino-Southeast Asia interactions; and Chinese Overseas diaspora studies. He is currently writing a book on the life and times of Lee Kong Chian.

== Publications ==
Books

- The Scripting of a National History: Singapore and its Pasts (Co-authored) (Singapore: NUS Press, in conjunction with Hong Kong University Press, 2008), 300 pp.
- Power and Identity in the Chinese World Order (Co-edited) (Hong Kong: Hong Kong University Press, 2003), 460 pp.
- Haiwai huaren yanjiu de dashiye yu xinfangxiang 海外华人研究的大视野与新方向 [Macro Perspectives and New Directions in the Studies of Chinese Overseas], (Co-edited) (River Edge, New Jersey: Global Publishing, 2002), 436 pp.
- The Politics of Depoliticization in Republican China: Guomindang Policy Towards Student Political Activism, 1927–1949 (Bern: Peter Lang AG, 1996) (Second edition, 1999), 242 pp.

Chinese-language version was published as 《难展的双翼:中国国民党面对学生运动的困境与决策(1927-1949年)》(北京：商务印书馆，2010), 272 pp.

Journal Articles

- “Umbilical Ties: The Framing of the Overseas Chinese as the Mother of the Revolution.” Frontiers of History in China 6, 2 (Jun 2011): 183–228.

Reprint as a chapter-in-book in Sun Yan-sen, Nanyang and the 1911 Revolution, edited by Lee Lai To and Lee Hock Guan (Singapore: Institute of Southeast Asian Studies, 2011), 75–129.
Revised Chinese version published as “Overseas Chinese as the Mother of Revolution: The Origins and Discourse of the Epithet 华侨为革命之母：赞誉之来历与叙述,” in International Journal of Diasporic Chinese Studies 华人研究 国际学报, 3,2 (Feb 2011): 21–56.

- “Conceptualizing Chinese Migration and Chinese Overseas: The Contribution of Wang Gungwu,” Journal of Chinese Overseas, 6, 1 (May 2010): 1–21.

Reprint as a chapter-in-book in China and International Relations: The Chinese View and the Contribution of Wang Gungwu, edited by Zheng Yongnian (London: Routledge, 2010), 139–157.

- “Portable Histories in Mobile City Singapore: The (Lack)lustre of Admiral Zheng He,” (co-authored) South East Asia Research, 17, 2 (Jul 2009): 287–309.
- “Shifting Culture and Identity: Three Portraits of Singapore Entrepreneur Lee Kong Chian (1893–1967),” Journal of Malaysian Branch of the Royal Asiatic Society, 82, 1 (Jun 2009): 71–100.

Chinese-language version in International Journal of Diasporic Chinese Studies 华人研究国际学报, 1, 2 (Dec 2009): 49–73.

- “In Search of Student Politics of the Past 追寻过往的学生运动,” in Tangent 圆切线, 6.2 (Aug 2007): 19–23 (Chinese), 24–29 (English) [Special Issue on “The Makers and Keepers of Singapore History 特辑：新加坡历史的创造者与守护人”].
- "Chinese Diasporic Culture and National Identity: The Taming of the Tiger Balm Gardens in Singapore,” (co-authored) Modern Asian Studies, 41, 1 (Jan 2007): 41–76.
- “Positioning the Student Political Activism of Singapore: Articulation, Contestation and Omission,” Inter-Asia Cultural Studies, 7.3 (Sep 2006): 403–430.
- “Entanglement of Business and Politics in the Chinese Diaspora: Interrogating the Wartime Patriotism of Aw Boon Haw,” Journal of Chinese Overseas, 2.1 (May 2006): 79–110.
- "History and the Imaginaries of 'Big Singapore': Positioning the Sun Yat Sen Nanyang Memorial Hall," (Co-authored) Journal of Southeast Asian Studies, 35.1 (Feb 2004): 65–89.
- "Politics of Depoliticization: Policy on the Wartime Expansion of the Guomindang Youth Corps into Schools," Journal of Oriental Studies, 34.2 (1996): 210–240.
- "The Formation of the Guomindang Youth Corps: An Analysis of Its Original Objectives," East Asian History, 5 (Jun 1993): 133–148.
