= Ah Chong =

Ah Chong, also spelled A Chong or Achong, is an English spelling of a Chinese familiar form of addressing a person whose given name contains the syllable Chong. Among overseas Chinese such forms of address sometimes became a person's legal name, and then were further transformed from a given name into the family name of their descendants. This occurred for example among ethnic Chinese in the Caribbean and in Samoa.

People with the given name or nickname Ah Chong include:

- Panglima Ah Chong (So Ah Chong), 19th-century Chinese immigrant in Taiping, Perak, Malaya
- Khairul Anuar Baharom (born 1974), Malaysian footballer nicknamed Ah Chong
- Ah Chong Sam Chong, Samoan sprinter, represented Samoa at the 2011 World Championships in Athletics

People with the family name Ah Chong or Achong include:

- Ellis Achong (1904–1986), Trinidadian cricketer
- Bert Achong (1928–1996), Trinidadian pathologist
- Sua Rimoni Ah Chong, Samoan politician

== See also ==
- Ah Cheng (born 1949), Chinese screenwriter
