= Lautimuia Uelese Vaʻai =

Samoan politician

Minister of Finance
- In office 1 October 2023 – 16 September 2025
- Prime Minister: Fiamē Naomi Mataʻafa
- Preceded by: Mulipola Anarosa Ale Molioʻo
- Succeeded by: Mulipola Anarosa Ale Molioʻo

Member of the Samoan Parliament for Vaimauga 3
- In office 26 May 2026 – 29 June 2026
- Preceded by: Taioaliʻiseu Fiti Aimaʻasu
- In office 7 March 2023 – 3 June 2025
- Preceded by: Tapunuu Niko Lee Hang
- Succeeded by: Taioaliʻiseu Fiti Aimaʻasu

Personal details
- Born: 1968 or 1969 (age 57–58)
- Party: Independent
- Other political affiliations: SUP (2025); FAST (until 2025)

Lautimuia Afoa Uelese Vaʻai (born 1968 or 1969) is a Samoan politician and former member of the Legislative Assembly of Samoa. He is a nephew of former Prime Minister Vaʻai Kolone.

== Biography ==
Vaʻai is from the villages of Magiagi and Vaisala and trained as an accountant at the University of the South Pacific in Fiji and Auckland University of Technology in New Zealand. He worked as a lecturer at the National University of Samoa and as a senior civil servant before being appointed chief executive of the Samoa Shipping Corporation in November 2017.

He contested the 2016 Samoan general election in the Vaimauga West 1 Constituency as a candidate for the Human Rights Protection Party (HRPP).

In February 2023 he was selected as the Faʻatuatua i le Atua Samoa ua Tasi (FAST) party candidate for the 2023 Vaimauga 3 by-election. He won the by-election, defeating his HRPP rival by 400 votes in the preliminary count. He was sworn in as an MP on 7 March 2023.

In a cabinet reshuffle on 6 September 2023 he was appointed Minister of Finance, replacing Mulipola Anarosa Ale Molioʻo from 1 October 2023.

Prime Minister Fiamē Naomi Mata‘afa called a snap election following the government's budget defeat in parliament on 27 May 2025. Following the dissolution of parliament, Vaʻai, Mata‘afa and the rest of cabinet confirmed their resignations from FAST and established the SUP. During the 2025 snap election, Vaʻai lost his seat to Taioaliʻiseu Fiti Aimaʻasu of the HRPP. Vaʻai's tenure as finance minister concluded on 16 September, and he was succeeded by Molioʻo.

Aima‘asu resigned from parliament in March 2026 to comply with party-hopping laws after defecting from the HRPP to join FAST. A by-election was triggered in Vaimauga 3 as a result and held on 1 May, which Va‘ai contested as an independent. During the campaign, Va‘ai stated he would avoid mudslinging and instead only "talk about the issues". Va‘ai said the country needed to prioritise addressing the cost-of-living issue and improving government financial management. He emphasised that an opposition member of parliament representing Vaimauga 3 would not prevent the constituency from receiving development funds, adding that the law guarantees all electorates equal financial access. Aima‘asu's victory would have given FAST a two-thirds majority in parliament, allowing it to alter the constitution. As such, Va‘ai warned that FAST securing the seat would have undermined checks and balances in government and claimed Samoa would become a "one-party state" as a result.

Va‘ai claimed that he, his family, and his village of Magiagi had been subject to online attacks during the campaign. He went on to reclaim the seat, securing a landslide victory. Following the by-election, Va‘ai thanked the constituency and the rest of Samoa, stating that the result signalled the will of his constituents. He pledged to remain an independent, declining to join any parties until the next general election, citing the wishes of many constituents. Va‘ai also said he would not change his affiliation after being sworn in, as it would trigger another by-election, which he said the electorate did not desire. He further stated that the voters held "authority" over the seat and not any political party. After returning to parliament, Va‘ai declared that his top priority was to strengthen the country's economy. He was sworn back into parliament on 26 May. Vaʻai and Aimaʻasu were found guilty of election bribery on 29 June by the court, sending the constituency back to another by-election.

Legislative Assembly of Samoa
Preceded by Tapunuu Niko Lee Hang	Member of Parliament for Vaimauga 3; 2023–2025	Succeeded by Taioaliʻiseu Fiti Aimaʻasu
Preceded by Taioaliʻiseu Fiti Aimaʻasu	Member of Parliament for Vaimauga 3; 2026	Vacant
Political offices
Preceded by Mulipola Anarosa Ale Molioʻo	Minister of Finance; 2023–2025	Succeeded by Mulipola Anarosa Ale Molioʻo
