= Wu Teh Yao =

Chinese political scientist (1915-1994)

- 吳德耀
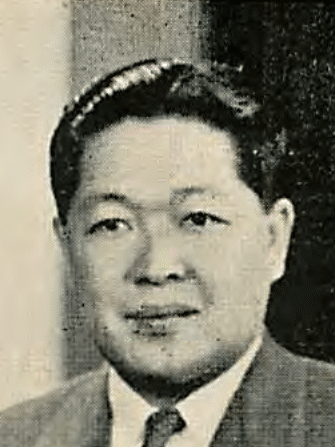
- Born: 1915
- Died: 17 April 1994 (aged 78–79); Taipei, Taiwan
- Education: Nanjing University (BA); Tufts University (MA); Harvard University (PhD)
- Occupation: Political scientist
- Known for: Coauthor of Fenn-Wu Report on education in Malaysia

Wu Teh Yao (simplified Chinese: 吴德耀; traditional Chinese: 吳德耀; pinyin: Wú Dé Yào, 1915–17 April 1994) was a Chinese political scientist. He was an educator and a specialist in Confucianism and political science.

== Education ==
Wu completed his senior school certificate at the Anglo-Chinese School in Penang at the age of seventeen. He was accepted into the Chung Ling High School, a well-known bilingual institution teaching in both Chinese and English, despite not knowing any Chinese, after an interview with the principal David Chen. After his graduation from Chung Ling in 1936, he was admitted to Nanking University (now known as Nanjing University) for a course of a Bachelor of Arts programs under Chen's recommendation. He later obtained a Master of Arts degree from Fletcher School of Law and Diplomacy, Tufts University, and a doctoral degree in political science from Harvard University in 1946.

He was an active athlete during his secondary school years. Furthermore, he represented Malayan Chinese at the National Sports Carnival, Shanghai, China, during the inter-war years.

== Career ==
=== Academia ===
Wu joined the United Nations after obtaining his doctorate and participated in the drafting of the Universal Declaration of Human Rights. In 1951, he co-authored the Fenn-Wu Report on the Chinese education system in Malaysia.

He was President of Tunghai University in Taiwan between 1957 and 1971. From then until 1975 he was the head of the Political Science Department, University of Singapore. He was a Professor and the Dean of the College of Graduate Studies of Nanyang University from 1975 to 1980, and was acting vice-chancellor from 1976 to 1977. When Nanyang University and University of Singapore merged in 1980 to form the National University of Singapore, he was appointed Professor of Political Science. He retired in 1981.

=== Offices ===
Professor Wu was a founding director of the Institute of East Asian Philosophies, which was established by Goh Keng Swee in 1983 in the interest of studying Confucianism.

== Retirement and death ==
After his retirement, Professor Wu, a modest person, lived in an HDB apartment in Jurong East, Singapore, and used taxis as his main form of transportation. He died on 17 April 1994 in Taipei, Taiwan, and a memorial service was held for him at the Presbyterian Church in Orchard Road, Singapore. A memorial lecture series was started in his name the following year, with the inaugural lecture delivered by the Confucian scholar Tu Weiming.
