= The Encyclopedia of the Chinese Overseas =

1998 encyclopedia by Lynn Pan

The Encyclopedia of the Chinese Overseas is an encyclopedia edited by Lynn Pan, originally published in 1998 by Landmark Books Pte. Ltd. and Editions Didier Millet in Singapore. It was published on behalf of the Chinese Heritage Centre, a subsidiary of the Singapore Federation of Chinese Clan Associations. It was later published in 1998 in the United Kingdom by Curzon Books, and in 1999 in the United States by Harvard University Press.

== Background ==
The Chinese Heritage Centre commissioned the book. The number of people who contributed to the book is over 50.

== Contents ==
Wang Gungwu wrote the introduction. Reviewer Hugh D. R. Baker stated that about 33% of the rest of the book is about general patterns while other parts are about specific communities of people of Chinese heritage.

The first part, "Origins," documents where the Chinese diasporas originated from. The second part, "Migration," documents migrations of people within and out of China. The third part, "Institutions," describes organisations established by overseas Chinese. The fourth part, "relations," describes the relationships of overseas Chinese to other people in their countries and to the mother country. Part 5, "Communities," documents individual overseas Chinese communities by region or country. The fifth part covers seven regions.

A timeline is at the end of the book. There is a bibliography and a glossary, with the former organized by the book's divisions.

== Reception ==
Baker described the book as "excellent value"; in 1998 the price was 35 pounds.

Christopher Fung stated that "Overall, the book is an invaluable resource for anyone" wishing to inquire about the book's subject. Fung criticized how the book, in his view, marginalizes overseas Chinese "who do not regard Chinese identity as a blueprint for collective action or ideological genuflection."

Shen Yuan-fang of Australian National University described the book as "at once scholarly and accessible" with an "admirable" design. Shen described the fifth part as the "core" of the book.

Morrison G. Wong of Texas Christian University described the book as a "well-researched monolith".

== See also ==
- Sons of the Yellow Emperor - A book by Pan
