= MV Queen Salamasina =

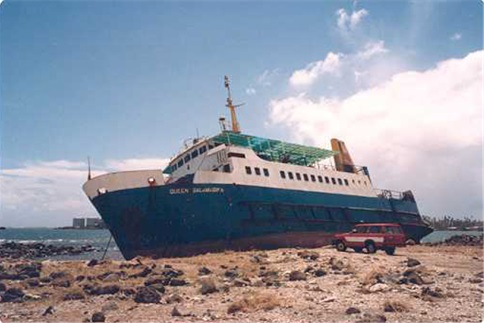
- The Queen Salamasina stranded on the Apia waterfront, 1990

History

Samoa
- Name: Queen Salamasina
- Operator: Samoa Shipping Corporation
- Builder: Dillingham Shipyard, Perth, Australia
- Launched: 30 April 1977
- Completed: October 1977
- Acquired: 1977
- Decommissioned: January 1999
- Identification: IMO number: 7601762
- Status: Decommissioned

- Name: MV Island Navigator
- Owner: Patterson Brothers Shipping Company (1999–2008)
- Christened: 1999
- Decommissioned: 2008
- Status: Decommissioned

General characteristics
- Type: Ferry (RORO)
- Tonnage: 714 GT (gross tonnage); 120 metric tons deadweight (DWT)
- Length: 43 m (141 ft)
- Beam: 10.2 m (33 ft)
- Complement: 14
- Notes: 206 passengers

The MV Queen Salamasina was an inter-island ferry which was operated in Samoa by the Samoa Shipping Corporation from 1977 to 1999.

The Queen Salamasina was constructed for the Australian government at the Dillingham Shipyard in Perth, Australia and completed in 1977. On completion, it was gifted to the Samoan government, which then leased it to the Samoa Shipping Corporation. Shortly after arriving in Samoa it damaged its propeller shaft in Apia harbour and had to be taken to Suva, Fiji for repairs. In September 1978 it added trips to Salelologa to its scheduled sailings to Pago Pago. Over its career it also sailed to Tokelau, Tonga, Niue, Rarotonga, Wallis and Futuna, Fiji, and New Zealand.

In February 1990 during Cyclone Ofa the ferry broke its moorings in Apia harbour and was washed ashore on the Apia waterfront. It was refloated in July 1990 and towed to Nelson, New Zealand for repairs. Increased maintenance costs and safety concerns following the repairs caused the Samoan government to ask the government of Japan to design and construct a replacement vessel.

The Queen Salamasina made its last trip for the SSC in January 1999 and was replaced on the Apia - Pago Pago route by the MV Lady Naomi. In November 1999 it was sold to Fijian company Patterson Brothers Shipping Company. It was renamed Island Navigator.
