= NUS Press =

University press of the National University of Singapore

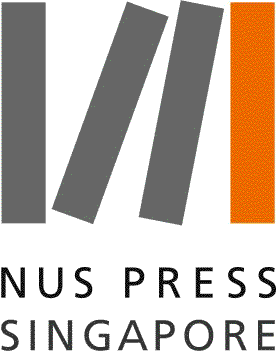
- Parent company: National University of Singapore
- Founded: 1971
- Country of origin: Singapore
- Headquarters location: Singapore
- Distribution: APD (Southeast Asia); Chicago Distribution Center (Americas); Eurospan Group (Europe, Africa, rest of Asia)
- Key people: Peter Schoppert
- Official website: nuspress.nus.edu.sg

NUS Press is an academic press in Singapore. It traces its origins to the Singapore University Press, which the University of Singapore established in 1971 as its publishing arm. The press specialises in books and journals that deal with topics on the social sciences and humanities in Asia.

== History ==
In 1954, the University of Malaya (founded in 1949) established a Publishing Committee to oversee manage academic publishing in Malaya. The Publishing Committee operated with the assistance of the Oxford University Press, which carried out editing and other back-end work for academic articles the Committee sent to the press for publishing. The committee comprised the university's vice chancellor as its chairman, a librarian, representatives from the University Council and Senate, the Education Ministry, and a representative from the OUP.

In 1959, the University of Malaya split into two autonomous units, with one division in Kuala Lumpur and the other in Singapore. These divisions eventually split in 1962 to become the University of Malaya and the University of Singapore. Despite the split, the two national universities continued to share a publishing arm. By this time, the Publishing Committee had become a limited company called the University of Malay Press (UM Press). The UM Press continued its collaboration with the OUP until 1969. It was not until 1971 that the University of Singapore established its own publishing arm in the Singapore University Press.

== Main Subject Areas ==
- Anthropology
- Archaeology
- Architecture and Building
- Business
- Economics
- Geography
- History
- Language Learning
- Literature & Linguistics
- Medicine & Life Sciences
- Memoirs
- Politics and International Relations
- Religion
- Sociology
- Visual Arts & Visual Culture

== Book Series ==
- Asian Studies Association of Australia (ASAA) - Southeast Asia Publications Series
- Kyoto CSEAS Series on Asian Studies
- Challenges of Agrarian Transition in Southeast Asia
- History of Medicine in Southeast Asia
- IRASEC Studies of Contemporary Southeast Asia
- Southeast Asian Classic Reprints
- Studies in Asian Security

== Journals ==
- Asian Bioethics Review
- China: An International Journal
- The Journal of Burma Studies
- The Heritage Journal
