= May 2026 Vaimauga 3 by-election =

- 1 May 2026
- Turnout: 81.15%
| | First party | Second party |
|---|---|---|
| Candidate | Lautimuia Uelese Vaʻai | Taioaliʻiseu Fiti Aimaʻasu |
| Party | Independent | FAST |
| Popular vote | 1,802 | 996 |
| Percentage | 46.87% | 25.90% |
| | Third party | Fourth party |
| Candidate | Tuʻumaʻaliʻi Fomaʻi Sapolu | Puaʻalatamai Filemoni Filemoni |
| Party | HRPP | Independent |
| Popular vote | 573 | 474 |
| Percentage | 14.90% | 12.33% |
MP before election
Taioaliʻiseu Fiti Aimaʻasu
HRPP
Elected MP
Lautimuia Uelese Vaʻai
Independent

A by-election to the Legislative Assembly of Samoa was held in the Vaimauga 3 constituency on 1 May 2026. The by-election was triggered after the incumbent representative, Taioaliʻiseu Fiti Aimaʻasu, resigned from parliament to join the governing Faʻatuatua i le Atua Samoa ua Tasi (FAST), after leaving the Human Rights Protection Party (HRPP). Members of parliament in Samoa are required to vacate their seats if they change their affiliations during a parliamentary term, but are eligible to contest the subsequent by-election.

During the campaign, Aima‘asu argued that aligning with the governing FAST party would secure the constituency more district development funds. Independent candidate Lautimuia Uelese Vaʻai, a former finance minister and the previous representative, stated that the constituency would not be disadvantaged by having an opposition representative and that the law would guarantee equal access to funds, as in districts with FAST members of parliament (MP). Vaʻai went on to reclaim the seat, securing a landslide victory with 46% of the vote. He defeated Aimaʻasu, who received 25%, and two other candidates. The results prevented FAST from acquiring a two-thirds majority in parliament, which would have enabled it to amend the constitution. Vaʻai and Aimaʻasu were later convicted for election bribery, sending Vaimauga 3 to another by-election.

== Background ==
During the 2025 snap election, Taioaliʻiseu Fiti Aimaʻasu, the HRPP candidate, won the constituency, defeating three other contestants, including the incumbent representative, Finance Minister Lautimuia Uelese Vaʻai of the Samoa Uniting Party (SUP). Vaʻai, who won the seat during a 2023 by-election, placed second, losing to Aimaʻasu by a margin of 126 votes. The FAST party secured a majority of seats at the election and went on to form a government, with Laʻauli Leuatea Schmidt as prime minister.

In March 2026, following consultations with his family and some constituents, Aimaʻasu left the HRPP to join FAST. He subsequently resigned from parliament to comply with the Electoral Act, which mandates that a representative vacate their seat if they change their party affiliation during a parliamentary session, triggering a by-election. These individuals are required to contest a by-election to regain their seats in the Legislative Assembly.

== Electoral system ==
Elections to all 51 of the directly elected seats in the Legislative Assembly are conducted through the first-past-the-post voting system. Candidates are required to hold a matai title, be at least 21 years old, and have resided in Samoa for a minimum of three years before the nomination date. Individuals convicted of a crime in Samoa or any other country within the previous eight years, and people with a mental illness, were ineligible to stand as candidates. Civil servants were permitted to run as long as they resigned from their positions. Should civil servants fail to do so, the date of filing their candidacy is, by law, deemed to be the point when they relinquish their role.

Universal Suffrage took effect in 1991, permitting all Samoan citizens aged 21 and over the right to vote. Compulsory voting and mandatory voter registration were in place for the by-election. Electors who failed to vote were required to pay 100 tālā, while eligible individuals who did not register on the electoral roll before the deadline were liable to pay a 2000 tālā fine. As Samoa did not employ overseas voting at the time of the by-election, electors enrolled in the Vaimauga 3 constituency were required to be present in the country to vote. A total of 4,785 individuals were registered to vote in the by-election.

== Candidates and campaign ==
Four candidates contested the by-election. The HRPP nominated Tuʻumaʻaliʻi Fomaʻi Sapolu, while Aimaʻasu ran as a FAST contestant. The other two contenders ran as independents, including the previous representative, former Finance Minister Vaʻai, and Puaʻalatamai Filemoni Filemoni, the incumbent mayor of Vailima. Filemoni said he had originally intended to run as a FAST candidate, but opted to contest as an independent after the party endorsed Aima‘asu. Filemoni declared he would nonetheless join FAST if elected. A debate between the candidates was scheduled to be held on 24 April and was organised by the National University of Samoa and BBC Media Action. The event was cancelled, however, after Aima‘asu withdrew, stating he needed to focus on preparing for the roadshow in his village. Sapolu declined to participate, claiming a debate was unnecessary, while Va‘ai stated he would not attend if none of the other candidates were present. Filemoni, on the other hand, expressed disappointment with the cancellation and said he would still have gone if all the other candidates had been absent.

=== Taioaliʻiseu Fiti Aimaʻasu ===
Aima‘asu argued that the representative for the constituency needed to be a member of the governing party to receive adequate benefits from its district funding scheme. He claimed his alignment with the opposition HRPP had hindered Vaimauga 3 from receiving the funds. Aima‘asu expressed concern about potential vote-splitting stemming from his family ties to Filemoni and Sapolu, and said many of his relatives were unsure whom to support as a result. Aima‘asu also said he was uncertain if his support in the villages of Vailima and Vaoala, where a majority of his votes came from in 2025, would hold or dissipate due to vote-splitting.

=== Tuʻumaʻaliʻi Fomaʻi Sapolu ===
Sapolu campaigned on "loyalty" and promised to share all resources and support each village equally, regardless of a constituent's political affiliation. Despite standing as an HRPP candidate, Sapolu said he had "nothing against FAST" or his relative Aima‘asu. Sapolu expressed concern about the quality of infrastructure in parts of Vaimauga 3 and believed the allocated district funding was inadequate, given that the electorate was larger than those of many other constituencies. He further highlighted an alleged misuse of funds in the government's WS$150 back-to-school program, claiming that some residents without school-aged children still received the funds and spent them on non-educational products.

=== Lautimuia Uelese Vaʻai ===
During the campaign, Va‘ai stated he would avoid mudslinging and instead only "talk about the issues". Va‘ai said the country needed to prioritise addressing the cost-of-living issue and improving government financial management. He emphasised that an opposition MP representing Vaimauga 3 would not prevent the constituency from receiving development funds, adding that the law guarantees all electorates equal financial access. Aima‘asu said Va‘ai's position constituted "hypocrisy" and claimed the constituency did not receive adequate funding when he was its representative. Aima‘asu's victory would have given FAST a two-thirds majority in parliament, allowing it to alter the constitution. As such, Va‘ai warned that FAST securing the seat would have undermined checks and balances in government and claimed Samoa would become a "one-party state" as a result. Va‘ai claimed that he, his family, and his village of Magiagi Tai had been subject to online attacks.

=== Puaʻalatamai Filemoni Filemoni ===
Filemoni said he was motivated to run after he felt a "calling from God". He highlighted his training as a social worker, which he said helped him understand community issues, particularly those affecting youth. Filemoni declined to make any specific promises during the campaign and said he would take cues from constituents and not a "textbook" or "from the internet". Addressing drug addiction among youth was a large focus of his campaign; he called for the implementation of stronger rehabilitation programmes. After the debate was cancelled, Filemoni held a press conference, which had low attendance, with only the Samoa Observer present. He attributed the sparse turnout to the organisation by Mermada Pacific, which he said had arranged the conference despite him not having requested one. Filemoni said all constituencies were guaranteed equal access to district funds regardless of the political affiliation of their representatives. He believed, however, that aligning with FAST would provide Vaimauga 3 with additional resources and greater influence in government.

== Conduct ==
Electoral Commissioner Toleafoa Tuiafelolo Stanley announced the election date in early April, shortly after the speaker of the Legislative Assembly issued the writ. The nomination period for contestants to register their candidacies occurred on 10 April. Contestants had until 16 April to withdraw from the by-election if they intended to do so. Pre-polling took place on 29 April, and reportedly went without issue. Around 130 individuals applied to cast an early vote. The official count occurred on the day after the by-election, while the O le Ao o le Malo, Tuimalealiʻifano Vaʻaletoʻa Sualauvi II, issued the constituency's election warrant on 4 May, confirming the results.

== Results ==
Va‘ai won the by-election in a landslide with 1,802 votes, allowing him to return to parliament. Aimaʻasu placed second with 996 votes, followed by the HRPP's Sapolu, who received 573 votes. Filemoni placed fourth. Va‘ai's victory over Aimaʻasu prevented FAST from securing the two-thirds majority needed to change the constitution.

| Candidate | Party | Votes | % |
|---|---|---|---|
| Lautimuia Uelese Vaʻai | Independent | 1,802 | 46.87 |
| Taioaliʻiseu Fiti Aimaʻasu | Faʻatuatua i le Atua Samoa ua Tasi | 996 | 25.90 |
| Tuʻumaʻaliʻi Fomaʻi Sapolu | Human Rights Protection Party | 573 | 14.90 |
| Puaʻalatamai Filemoni Filemoni | Independent | 474 | 12.33 |
| Total | | 3,845 | 100.00 |
| Valid votes | | 3,845 | 99.02 |
| Invalid/blank votes | | 38 | 0.98 |
| Total votes | | 3,883 | 100.00 |
| Registered voters/turnout | | 4,785 | 81.15 |
Source: OEC

== Aftermath ==
Following the by-election, Va‘ai thanked the constituency and the rest of Samoa, stating that the result signalled the will of his constituents. He pledged to remain an independent, declining to join any parties until the next general election, citing the wishes of many constituents. Va‘ai also said he would not change his affiliation after being sworn in, as it would trigger another by-election, which he said the electorate did not desire. He further stated that the voters held "authority" over the seat and not any political party. After returning to parliament, Va‘ai declared that his top priority was to strengthen the country's economy.

Aimaʻasu filed an electoral petition against Va‘ai on 18 May, accusing him of bribery and treating. Va‘ai subsequently filed a counter-petition. He was sworn in to parliament on 26 May. On 29 June, the courts found both Va‘ai and Aimaʻasu guilty, sending the constituency back to another by-election.
