= Sons of the Yellow Emperor =

1990 non-fiction book by Lynn Pan

Sons of the Yellow Emperor: A History of the Chinese Diaspora is a non-fiction book by Lynn Pan. It was published in 1990 by Little, Brown & Company. It was published by Secker & Warburg in the United Kingdom. Kodansha America published later editions of the book.

The book covers the Chinese diaspora worldwide from 1500 to the time of publication of the book. Andrew J. Nathan stated that the book describes anti-Chinese discrimination "without preaching". Much of the primary sourcing comes from Western people.

Edgar Wickberg of the University of British Columbia wrote that it is "the first serious and sustained narrative treatment of [its topic] as an [sic] historical phenomenon." According to Wickberg, much of the content focuses on Hong Kong, Malaysia, Singapore, the United Kingdom, and the United States, with some other portions related to Indonesia, the Philippines, and Thailand.

== Contents ==
One chapter is "Jews of the East," which describes how ethnic Chinese became economically powerful in various countries, "Trojan Horse" describes perceptions of ethnic Chinese devotion to the countries they are in and/or to their mother country. Restrictions against ethnic Chinese participating in the economies and how ethnic Chinese dealt with the issue are in "Crooks or Capitalists". There is also a chapter on "Cultural and National Identities" which explores how strongly ethnic Chinese feel connections to China and/or to other countries. The chapter "Hybrids" describes intermarriages between ethnic Chinese and other ethnic groups.

== Reception ==
Betty Lee Sung of City College of New York wrote that "The book is valuable for its overview".

Wickberg concluded that "I wish I had written this book." Wickberg argued that the book should have had more focus on Canada, which has a major Chinese diaspora.

== See also ==
- The Encyclopedia of the Chinese Overseas - An encyclopedia edited by Pan
