= Nanyang Technological University Libraries =

University library system in Singapore

NTU Library
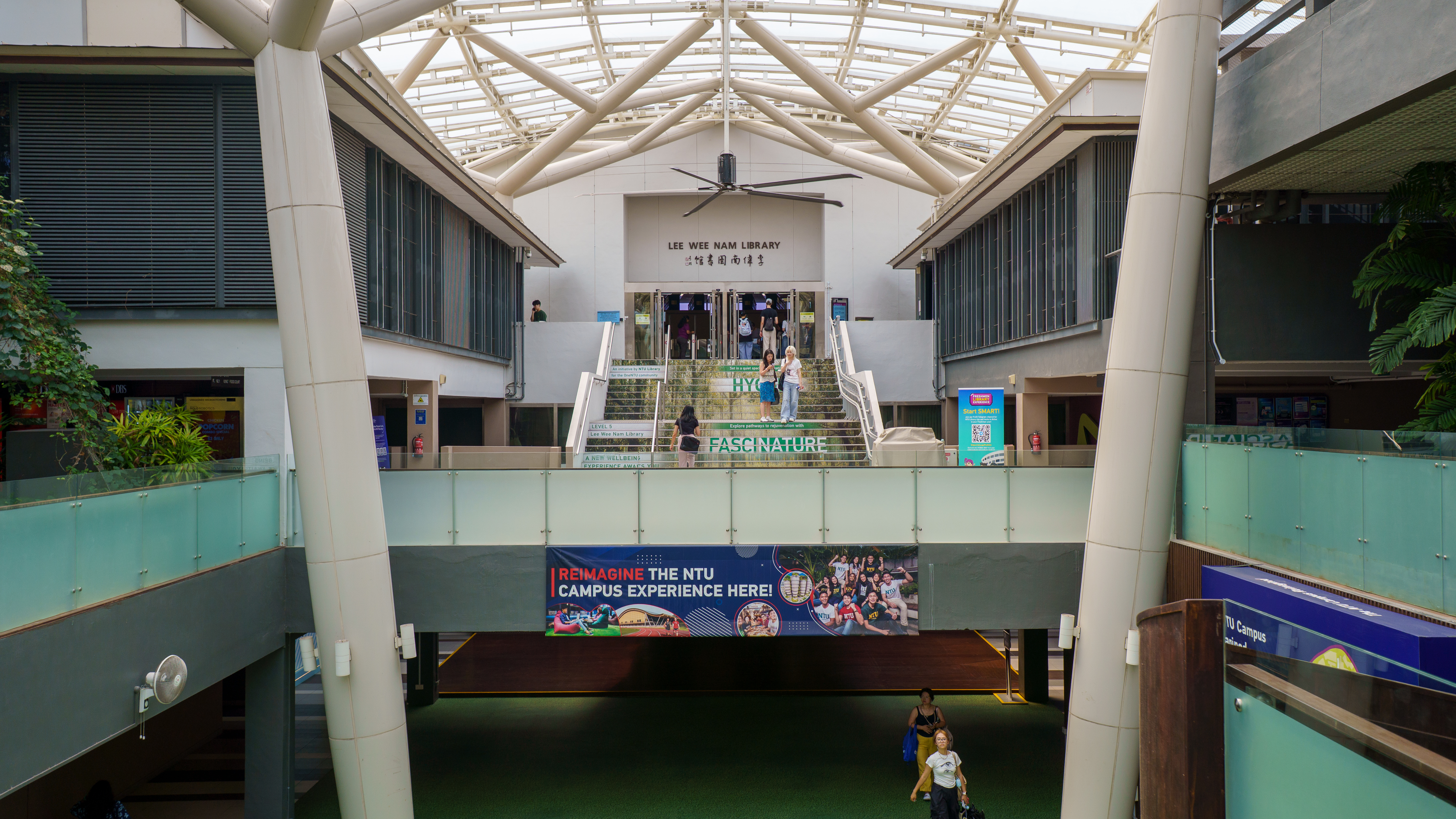
- Entrance to the Lee Wee Nam Library
- 1.3466°N 103.6805°E
- Location: Nanyang Technological University, Singapore, Singapore
- Type: Academic library
- Established: 1981
- Branches: 8

Collection
- Items collected: Books, e-books, periodicals, audio-visual materials, databases, research outputs
- Size: 819,572 print books; 1,830,004 e-books (2026)

Other information
- Website: www.ntu.edu.sg/library

NTU Library, formally the Nanyang Technological University Libraries, is the library system of Nanyang Technological University (NTU) in Singapore. It comprises eight libraries on the university's Yunnan Garden campus, the largest of which is the Lee Wee Nam Library, and is managed by NTU's Office of Information, Knowledge and Library Services. As of May 2026 its holdings included about 820,000 print books, 1.83 million e-books, 104,000 audio-visual items and 143,000 print and electronic periodical titles, as well as more than 134,000 scholarly publications in the university's institutional repository, DR-NTU.

== History ==
The library's history dates from 1981, when NTU's predecessor, the Nanyang Technological Institute, was established; its founding university librarian was Lim Hong Too. In June 2001 the company Lee Hiok Kee donated S$10 million to NTU for the Lee Wee Nam Endowment Fund in Life Sciences, and in recognition the university renamed its main library after Lee Wee Nam (1881–1964), a Teochew banker and community leader. The renaming took effect on 2 November 2001.

In September 2003 the resource centre of the Chinese Heritage Centre was named the Wang Gungwu Library, in recognition of the scholarship of the historian Wang Gungwu. In 2008 the former Humanities and Social Sciences Library was converted into a dedicated Chinese Library, while the humanities and social sciences collection moved to new premises. The Library Outpost, offering multidisciplinary books, audio-visual materials and course reserves, is located in the UOB Innovation Hub (formerly The Hive). A wellness area on Level 5 of the Lee Wee Nam Library opened in 2021. In May 2023 the Professor Lim Chong Yah Reading Room was launched in the Humanities and Social Sciences Library.

In July 2026 it was reported that the former Nanyang University Library and Administration Building, which houses the Chinese Heritage Centre, would close for a two-year renovation; the library has said that the Wang Gungwu Library is undergoing temporary collection management. Level B4 of the Business Library was permanently closed from 24 October 2026, with its seats moved to other levels.

== Libraries ==
Library	Location	Main collections
Lee Wee Nam Library	North Spine	Engineering and science; the largest library, with 7,895 square metres (84,980 sq ft) of space as of 2020
Business Library	North Spine	Accounting, banking, finance, management, marketing and other business subjects
Art, Design & Media Library	School of Art, Design and Media	Visual arts, architecture, design, photography and audio-visual materials
Chinese Library	South Spine	Chinese-language materials across disciplines, including rare thread-bound books
Communication & Information Library	Wee Kim Wee School of Communication and Information	Mass communication, information science and media law
Humanities & Social Sciences Library	South Spine	Psychology, history, literature, philosophy and other humanities and social sciences
Library Outpost	UOB Innovation Hub	Audio-visual collection and course reserves for humanities, social sciences and business
Wang Gungwu Library	Chinese Heritage Centre	Ethnic Chinese overseas, including Southeast Asian Chinese communities

Source: NTU Library. The Library Instructional Commons in the North Spine provides space for instruction.

=== Lee Wee Nam Library ===
The Lee Wee Nam Library houses the engineering and science collections and the library's administration. Its Level 5 is designated a quiet zone. The Lee Wee Nam Science & Technology Endowment Fund, set up in 2007, supports its engineering and science books and electronic resources.

=== Chinese Library ===
When it opened in 2008, the Chinese Library had about 1,000 square metres (11,000 sq ft) of space, 132 seats and about 60,000 volumes of Chinese titles. Its rare book collection includes the Wuyingdian edition of the Kangxi Dictionary. Its reading room is designated a quiet zone.

=== Wang Gungwu Library ===
The Wang Gungwu Library, located in the former Nanyang University Library and Administration Building, holds about 56,000 items, mainly on ethnic Chinese overseas. Members of NTU Library may borrow its non-reference materials.

== Access ==
Free seating in all eight libraries is open to library users without reservation, while bookable seats and rooms are reserved for current NTU and NIE students and staff. Alumni and members of the public may apply for library membership.
