= Germ cell nuclear acidic peptidase =

Protein-coding gene in humans

GCNA

Identifiers
- Aliases: GCNA, NAAR1, ACRC, acidic repeat containing, germ cell nuclear acidic peptidase, SPGFX4
- External IDs: OMIM: 300369; GeneCards: GCNA; OMA:GCNA - orthologs

Gene location (Human)
Chr.	X chromosome (human)
Band	Xq13.1	Start	71,578,437 bp
Band	Xq13.1	End	71,613,583 bp
RNA expression pattern
Bgee	Human / Mouse (ortholog); Top expressed in: gonad; testicle; mucosa of ileum; right testis; granulocyte; gastrocnemius muscle; sperm; cartilage tissue; left testis; muscle of thigh / n/a; More reference expression data
BioGPS	n/a
Orthologs
Species	Human	Mouse
Entrez	93953	n/a
Ensembl	ENSG00000147174	n/a
UniProt	Q96QF7	n/a
RefSeq (mRNA)	NM_052957	n/a
RefSeq (protein)	NP_443189	n/a
Location (UCSC)	Chr X: 71.58 – 71.61 Mb	n/a
PubMed search		n/a
- Wikidata
View/Edit Human

Germ cell nuclear acidic peptidase, also known as acidic repeat containing protein (ACRC) is a protein that in humans is encoded by the GCNA gene.
