= Taioaliʻiseu Fiti Aimaʻasu =

Samoan politician

Member of the Samoan Parliament for Vaimauga 3
- In office 16 September 2025 – 5 March 2026
- Preceded by: Lautimuia Uelese Vaʻai
- Succeeded by: Lautimuia Uelese Vaʻai

Personal details
- Party: Faʻatuatua i le Atua Samoa ua Tasi (since 2026)
- Other political affiliations: Human Rights Protection Party (until 2026)

Taioaliʻiseu Taimalelagi Saunia Afoa Fiti Aimaʻasu is a Samoan politician who served as a member of the Legislative Assembly of Samoa from 2025 to 2026. He is a member of the Faʻatuatua i le Atua Samoa ua Tasi (FAST) party.

Aimaʻasu worked as a public servant in the Ministry of Justice and Ministry of Education for 13 years. In 2016 he resigned to establish a tourism business, Tai's Native Experience. In 2023 his business won the award for Best Cultural Tour Operator in Oceania at the UK Travel Awards. He has also worked as a FIA referee.

Aimaʻasu was elected to parliament during the 2025 snap election as a member of the Human Rights Protection Party, winning the Vaimauga 3 constituency. He defeated the incumbent representative, Finance Minister Lautimuia Uelese Vaʻai of the Samoa Uniting Party, by a margin of 126 votes, and two other candidates.

In March 2026, Aimaʻasu resigned from parliament to join the governing FAST party, triggering a by-election in the seat. According to the Electoral Act, members of parliament who switch affiliations during a parliamentary term are required to vacate their seats and must contest a by-election to re-enter the Legislative Assembly. Aimaʻasu said he based his decision on consultations with some of his constituents and his family. He went on to lose the by-election in a landslide to Vaʻai, denying FAST a two thirds majority in parliament, which would have permitted the party to alter the constitution. He subsequently filed an electoral petition against Vaʻai, accusing him of corrupt electoral practices. Vaʻai submitted a counter petition. The pair were both found guilty on 29 June.

Legislative Assembly of Samoa
Preceded by Lautimuia Uelese Vaʻai	Member of Parliament for Vaimauga 3; 2025–2026	Succeeded by Lautimuia Uelese Vaʻai
