= China: An International Journal =

- Discipline: International relations
- Language: English

Publication details
- History: 2003-present
- Publisher: NUS Press (Singapore)

Standard abbreviations
- ISO 4: China: Int. J.

Indexing
- ISSN: 0219-7472 (print); 0219-8614 (web)

Links
- Journal homepage

China: An International Journal covers politics, economics, society, geography, law, culture and international relations in modern China, including Hong Kong, Macau, and Taiwan. The journal is published by NUS Press Singapore.

The journal is edited by Zheng Yongnian (East Asian Institute) and Yang Dali (University of Chicago).

== Abstracting and indexing ==
The journal is abstracted in Social Sciences Citation Index®, Journal Citation Reports/Social Sciences Edition, Current Contents®/Social and Behavioral Sciences, International Bibliography of the Social Sciences, Bibliography of Asian Studies and Econlit.
