= Lynn Pan =

Chinese author

Lynn Pan (Chinese: 潘翎 (1945-2024), also Ling Pan, was an author and an expert on Shanghai and the Overseas Chinese. She was born in Shanghai and studied at the University of London and Cambridge University. Her best-known book is Sons of the Yellow Emperor. Pan has lived in Kota Kinabalu (Malaysia), England, Geneva, Helsinki, Hong Kong, Singapore and Shanghai. She was the director of Chinese Heritage Centre https://www.ntu.edu.sg/chc] in Singapore from 1995 to 1998.

== Selected bibliography ==
- In Search of Old Shanghai (1982), ISBN 962-04-0195-6
- Old Shanghai: Gangsters in Paradise (1984), ISBN 962-225-164-1
- China's Sorrow: Journeys Around the Yellow River (1985), ISBN 0-7126-0732-3 (published in the U.S. as Into China's Heart: An Émigré's Journey Along the Yellow River)
- The New Chinese Revolution (1987), ISBN 0-241-12038-1
- Sons of the Yellow Emperor: The Story of the Overseas Chinese (1990), ISBN 0-436-35374-1 (U.S.: Sons of the Yellow Emperor: A History of the Chinese Diaspora)
- Tracing It Home: Journeys Around a Chinese Family (1992), ISBN 0-436-35375-X
- True to Form: A Celebration of the Art of the Chinese Craftsman (2000), ISBN 962-7283-15-0
- The Encyclopedia of the Chinese Overseas (1999), ISBN 0-7007-1122-8 (ed.)
- Shanghai Style: Art and Design Between the Wars (2008), ISBN 978-1-59265-078-1
