= Chinese Heritage Centre =

Research centre on the Chinese overseas in Singapore

- 华裔馆
- The former Nanyang University Library and Administration Building, home of the centre
- Established: 17 May 1995; 31 years ago
- Field of research: Chinese overseas
- Location: 12 Nanyang Drive, West Region, 637721, Singapore; 1.343733°N 103.683989°E
- Operating agency: Nanyang Technological University
- Website: www.ntu.edu.sg/chc

The Chinese Heritage Centre (CHC; Chinese: 华裔馆; pinyin: Huáyì Guǎn) is an autonomous institute of Nanyang Technological University (NTU) in Singapore devoted to the study of the Chinese overseas. Its activities cover research, exhibitions, public education, documentation and archives, and it houses the Wang Gungwu Library. Founded in 1995 as a non-profit organisation, it became part of NTU in 2011. The centre occupies the former Library and Administration Building of Nanyang University, which, together with the university's memorial and arch, is a national monument.

== Building ==
The ground-floor hall and octagonal central void

Nanyang University was founded with funds raised from Singapore's Chinese community, after the rubber merchant Tan Lark Sye proposed a Chinese-language university in 1953; the Hokkien Huay Kuan donated land in Jurong for its campus. Construction of the campus, including the Library and Administration Building and the arch, began in 1954 to designs by the local architect Ng Keng Siang. Classes began on the new campus in March 1956, and the university was officially opened on 30 March 1958.

The building is designed in what the National Heritage Board describes as the Chinese National style, with a distinctively Chinese roof on a reinforced concrete structure; its roof-end tiles bear the characters nan (南) and da (大), short for the university's name. The side wings have brick-faced façades. An octagonal void rises through the centre of the building, encircled by staircases, and the treatment of the columns and structural framing draws on the Song-dynasty building manual Yingzao Fashi.

The building first served as the university library and became its administration block in 1966. After Nanyang University merged with the University of Singapore in 1980 to form the National University of Singapore, the campus was taken over by the Nanyang Technological Institute, the predecessor of NTU. In February 1998 the government approved the preservation of the building, the Nanyang University Memorial and the arch, pending technical surveys before gazetting, and they were gazetted as a national monument later that year.

In July 2026 Lianhe Zaobao reported that the building had closed for a two-year renovation and refurbishment planned by NTU.

== History ==
The Chinese Heritage Centre was officially opened on 17 May 1995 by George Yeo, then Minister for Information and the Arts, who on the same day unveiled a replica of the Nanyang University arch in Yunnan Garden. It was set up with a S$5 million government endowment and is funded by donations from business leaders and clan associations together with government matching grants, under an international board of governors.

In 2010 the operation of the centre's library was taken over by NTU Library under an agreement made in 2007, and in 2011 the centre was reconstituted as an autonomous institute of NTU. The chairman of its board of governors is Su Guaning, President Emeritus of NTU.

== Activities ==
=== Publications ===
The centre produced The Encyclopedia of the Chinese Overseas, edited by Lynn Pan. The English edition was launched by Prime Minister Goh Chok Tong on 26 October 1998, and a French edition followed in 2000. Since May 2005 it has published the Journal of Chinese Overseas, a refereed journal issued twice a year. Its other publications include Southeast Asian Personalities of Chinese Descent: A Biographical Dictionary (2012), edited by Leo Suryadinata.

=== Exhibitions ===
The centre's permanent exhibitions have included the Nantah Pictorial Exhibition on the history of Nanyang University, and Chinese More or Less: An Exhibition on Overseas Chinese Identity, which George Yeo, then Minister for Foreign Affairs, opened on 22 July 2005. It also displays an Early Textbook Collection of more than 2,000 volumes, mostly textbooks used in Southeast Asia and China from the 1920s to the 1970s.

=== Wang Gungwu Library ===
The centre's resource centre was named the Wang Gungwu Library on 13 September 2003 in recognition of the scholarship of the historian Wang Gungwu. It holds about 56,000 items, mainly on the Chinese overseas, and members of NTU Library may borrow its non-reference materials.

== See also ==
- The Encyclopedia of the Chinese Overseas
- Nanyang University
