= Tapunuu Niko Lee Hang =

Samoan politician (died 2022)

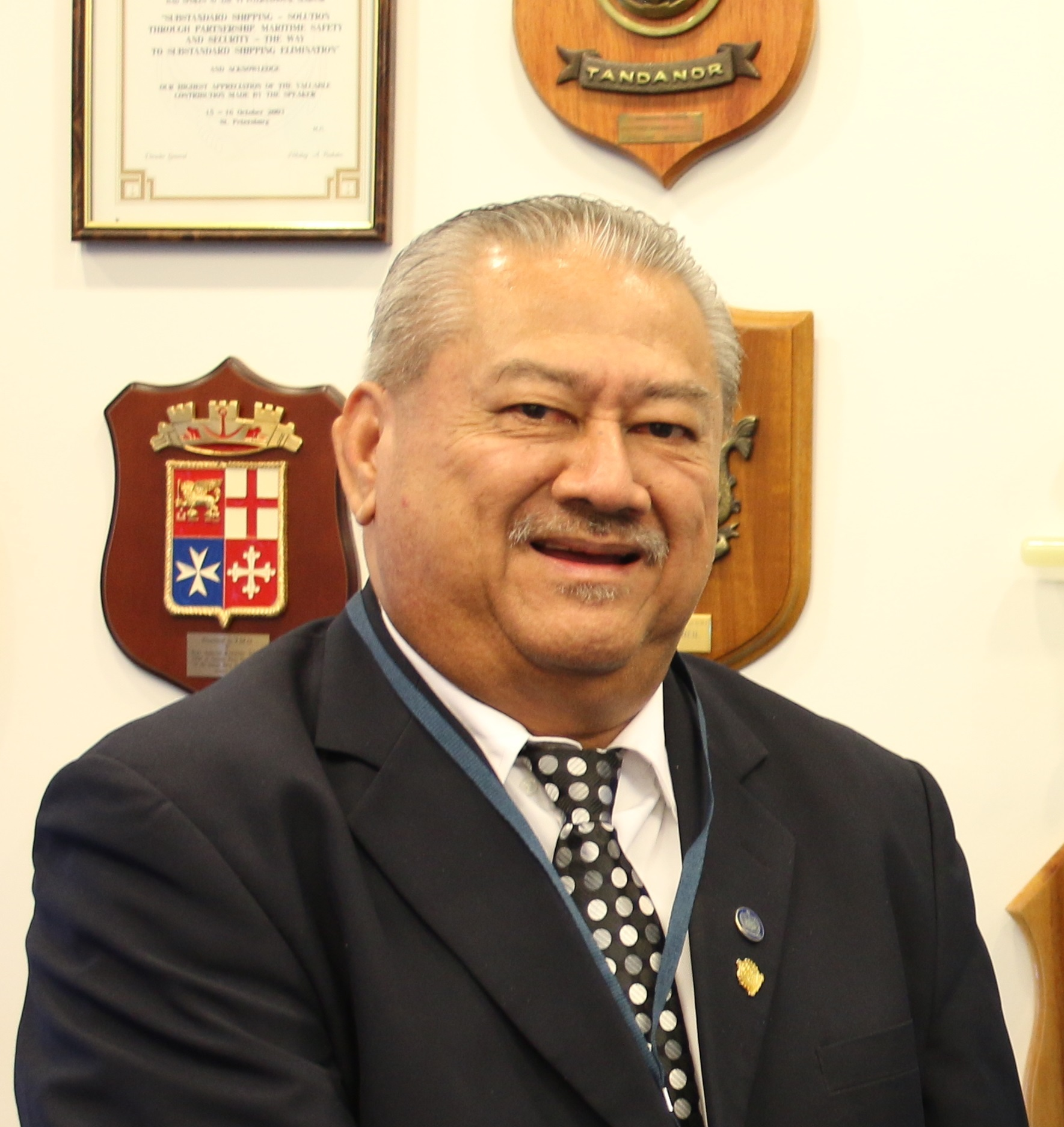
- Hang in 2019

Minister of Works Transport and Infrastructure
- In office 18 March 2016 – 24 May 2021
- Prime Minister: Tuilaepa Aiono Sailele Malielegaoi
- Preceded by: Manu'alesagalala Enokati Posala
- Succeeded by: Olo Fiti Vaai

Minister of Finance
- In office 24 April 2006 – 21 March 2011
- Preceded by: Misa Telefoni Retzlaff
- Succeeded by: Faumuina Tiatia Liuga

Member of the Samoa Parliament for Vaimauga No. 3
- In office 9 April 2021 – 29 November 2022
- Preceded by: none (constituency created)
- Succeeded by: Lautimuia Uelese Vaʻai

Member of the Samoa Parliament for Urban East
- In office 4 March 2016 – 9 April 2021
- Preceded by: none (constituency created)

Member of the Samoa Parliament for Individual Voters
- In office 18 December 2001 – 4 March 2016
- Preceded by: Chan Chui Van Sung
- Succeeded by: none (constituency abolished)

Personal details
- Born: 1953 or 1954
- Died: 29 November 2022 (aged 68) Motoʻotua, Samoa
- Party: Human Rights Protection Party

Tapunuu Niko Lee Hang (born 1953 or 1954; died 29 November 2022) was a Samoan politician and Cabinet Minister. He was a member of the Human Rights Protection Party.

Hang was an accountant by profession and a former Public Trustee. He was educated at Waikato University in New Zealand and the University of New England in Australia. He was first elected to the Legislative Assembly of Samoa as one of two parliamentary representatives reserved for Individual Voters in a by-election in December 2001. In January 2002 he was appointed Parliamentary Under Secretary to Minister of Justice. In 2004 he was appointed Parliamentary Under Secretary to minister of Revenue. He was re-elected at the 2006 election and appointed Minister of Finance. He was re-elected again in the 2011 election, but replaced as Finance Minister by Faumuina Tiatia Liuga. From 2012 to 2014 Hang opposed plans to replace the individual voter seats with two urban seats.

After serving a term as a backbencher, he was re-appointed to Cabinet following the 2016 election as Minister of Works Transport and Infrastructure. In September 2018 he claimed that the chief executive of the Ministry of Works, Afamasaga Su’a Pou Onesemo, had been fired for poor management. He retracted the claim two days later.

Following the abolition of his urban voters seat he contested the new seat of Vaimauga No. 3 in the 2021 Samoan general election and was re-elected.

Tapunuu died at Tupua Tamasese Meaole National Hospital in Motoʻotua on 29 November 2022, at the age of 68.
