= Wang Gungwu =

Chinese Australian historian

Wang Gungwu AO, CBE
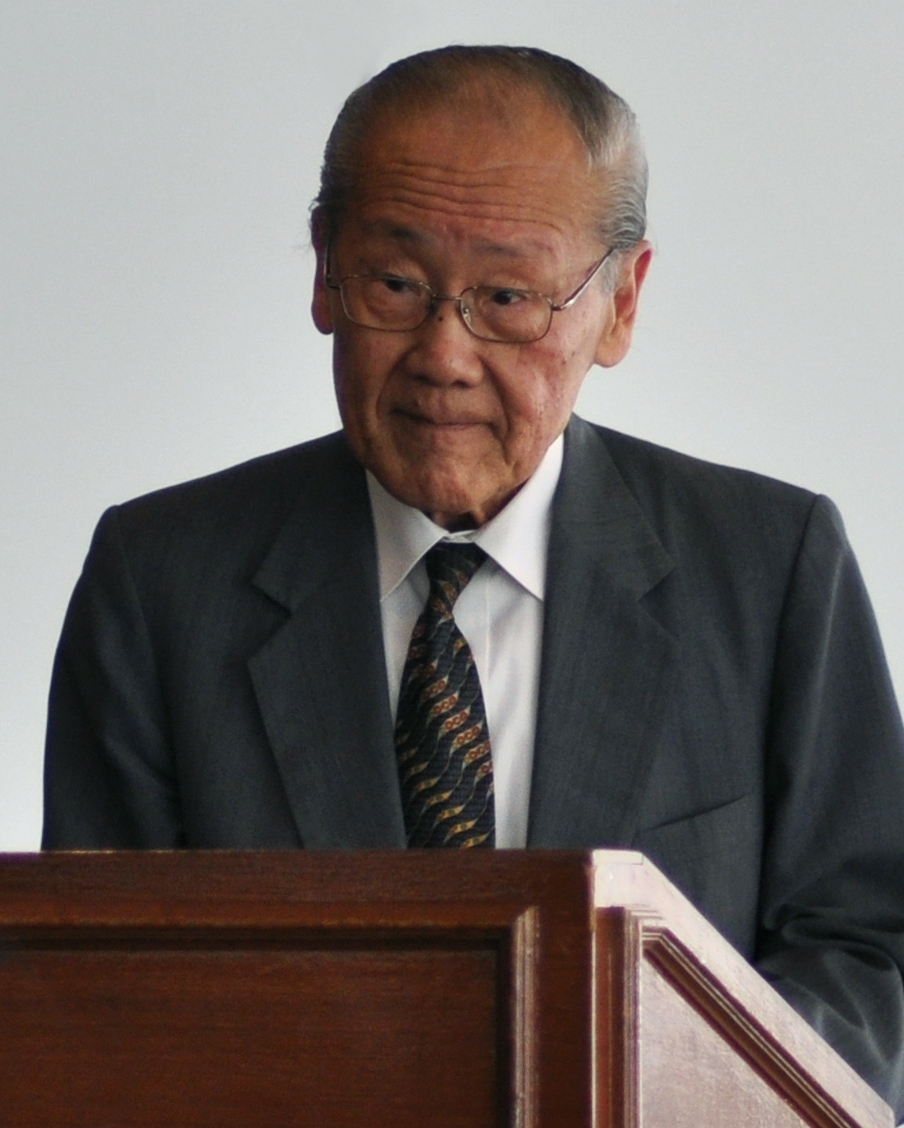
- Wang Gungwu speaking at an event in 2010
- Born: October 9, 1930 (age 95); Surabaya, Dutch East Indies (now Indonesia)
- Citizenship: Australian
- Education: University of Malaya (BA, MA); SOAS University of London (PhD)
- Known for: Vice-Chancellor of the University of Hong Kong, University Professor of the National University of Singapore, Doyen of Overseas Chinese historical scholarship
- Scientific career
- Fields: Sinology
- Workplaces: University of Malaya; Australian National University; University of Hong Kong; National University of Singapore
- Doctoral advisor: Denis C. Twitchett
- Doctoral students: Huang Jianli, Ng Chin-Keong

Wang Gungwu AO, CBE (simplified Chinese: 王赓武; traditional Chinese: 王賡武; pinyin: Wáng Gēngwǔ; born 9 October 1930), also written Wang Gung Wu, is a Chinese Australian historian, sinologist, and writer specialising in the history of China and Southeast Asia. He has studied and written about the Chinese diaspora. An expert on the Chinese tianxia ("all under heaven") concept, he was the first to suggest its application to the contemporary world as an American tianxia. He is the recipient of many honours and awards, including the Tang Prize.

== Early life and education ==
Wang Gungwu, also written Wang Gung Wu, was born on 9 October 1930 in Surabaya, in the Dutch East Indies (now Indonesia) to well-educated ethnic Chinese parents from Jiangsu and Zhejiang: his father, Wang Fo Wen (also spelt Wang Fuwen), was a scholar of Chinese classics, and his mother was Ding Yan. The couple moved so that his father could take up the post as headmaster of the Huaqiao High School, the first Chinese high school in Surabaya. They stayed there for two years, moving when young Wang was a year old to Ipoh, British Malaya, where his father became assistant inspector of Chinese schools.

Wang completed his secondary education in Anderson School, an English medium school in Ipoh, learning Chinese classics and history at home from his father.

At the end of the Japanese occupation of Malaya in 1946, the family returned to China. Wang enrolled at the National Central University in Nanjing, but did not complete a degree there, after his parents had returned to Ipoh in March 1948 because his father and Wang followed later in the year because of the political chaos in China.

From October 1949 he studied history at the newly-opened University of Malaya (Singapore campus), where he received his bachelor's (1953) and master's (1955) degrees, majoring in history. He was a founding member of the University Socialist Club and its founding president in 1953. He was also editor of the student newspaper and president of the Students' Union, and published a collection of his poetry during this time.

He used a British Council scholarship to study at the School of Oriental and African Studies, University of London, earning a PhD (1957) for his thesis "The structure of power in North China during the Five Dynasties", under Denis C. Twitchett, published as a book in 1963.

== Career ==
Wang taught at the University of Malaya as a lecturer in history, first in Singapore and then at the Kuala Lumpur campus from 1959. He was appointed dean of the Arts Faculty in 1962, but in 1963 but stepped down to instead become head of the history department, a position he held until 1968. He was one of the youngest ever professors ever appointed at the university.

In 1968 he went to Canberra, Australia, to become head of far eastern history in the Research School of Pacific and Asian Studies (RSPAS) at the Australian National University (ANU), a position he held until 1975, and then again from 1980 until 1986. For five years between 1975 and 1980, he was director of RSPAS.

Wang left Australia in 1986 to becomes vice-chancellor of the University of Hong Kong, until 1995. In 1996, he returned to Singapore to become the director the Institute of East Asian Political Economy, later known as the East Asian Institute. He stepped down as director in 2007, but remained chairman of the EAI until 2019.

He was the founding chair of the Lee Kuan Yew School of Public Policy at NUS.

=== Writing ===
Wang has written extensively in the history of China and Southeast Asia, and has also studied and written about the Chinese diaspora. He has objected to the use of the word diaspora to describe the migration of Chinese from China because both it mistakenly implies that all overseas Chinese are the same and has been used to perpetuate fears of a "Chinese threat", under the control of the Chinese government.

Discussing the idea of China and Chinese identity, Wang observes, "Almost every aspect of Chineseness underwent considerable change during the past 3,000 years . . . and any effort to outline them without reference to time and the processes of change before the modern era must be inadequate."

== Other activities ==
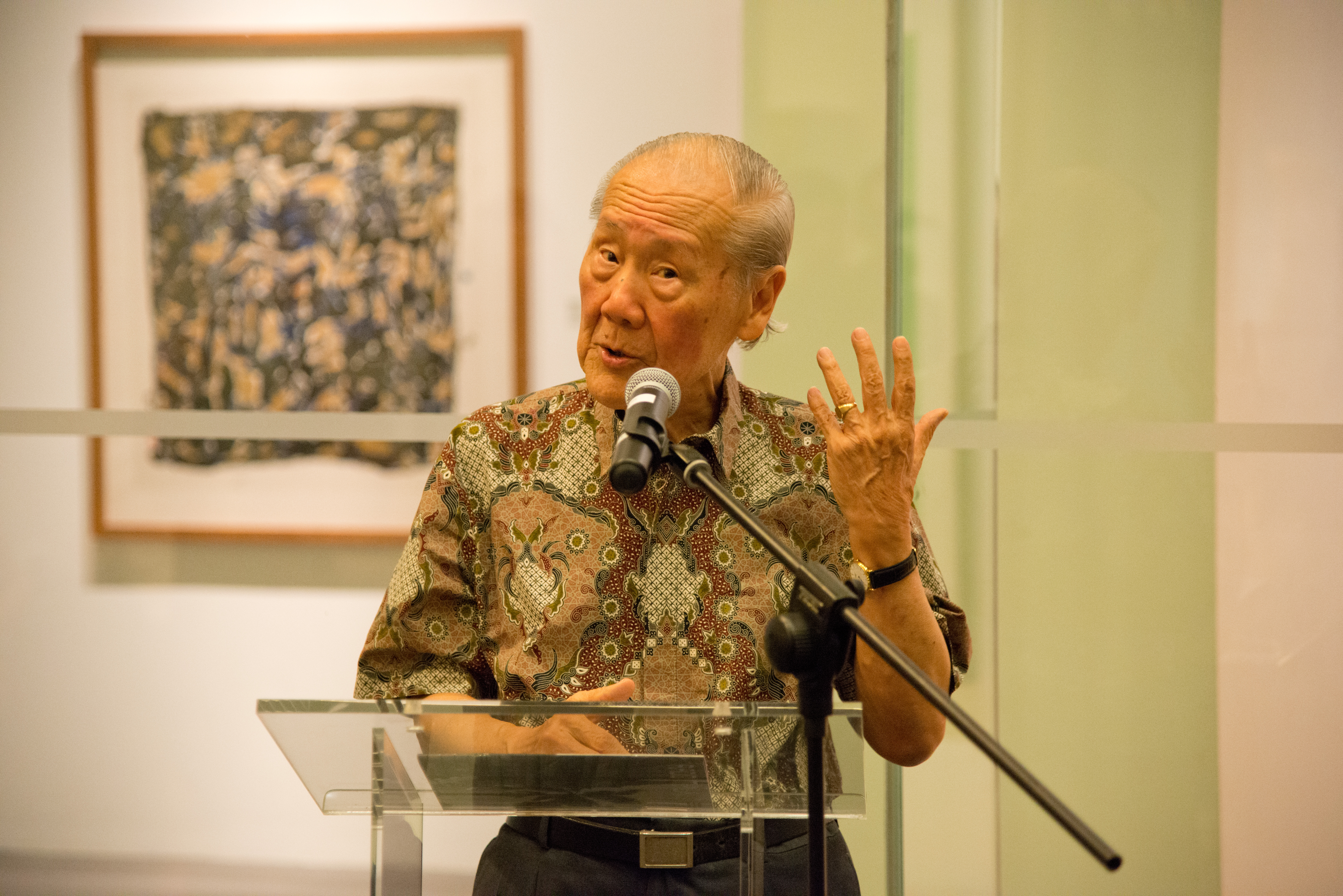
Wang Gungwu giving a talk at an event (Radio Malaya: Abridged Conversations About Art) in 2017

Wang helped with the founding of the Malaysian political party Gerakan, but he was not personally directly involved in the party's activities. He later said that he was not interested in a political career, but helped his friend and co-founder of the party, Tan Chee Khoon, to help draft the party's constitution.

In 1965, he chaired a committee to review the curriculum of Nanyang University. The committee reported in May 1965. Meanwhile, in August 1965, Singapore separated from the Federation of Malaysia as an independent republic. In September 1965, the committee was released and the university accepted the recommendations, triggering student protests, petitions, and boycotts of classes and examinations.

Wang was a key figure in the establishment of the Asian Studies Association of Australia in 1976 and served as president.

He served as president of the Australian Academy of the Humanities from 1980 to 1983.

Wang was a Distinguished Professorial Fellow at the ISEAS – Yusof Ishak Institute, where he was chairman of the board of trustees from 1 November 2002 to 31 October 2019.

Since at least 2020 and as of 2025 Wang was chairman of the International Advisory Council at the Universiti Tunku Abdul Rahman (in Kampar, Malaysia).

In 2022, Wang was senior fellow at the Diplomatic Academy at the Singapore Ministry of Foreign Affairs, and an adviser to the Ministry of Education's (MOE) Social Science Research Council.

== Recognition and awards ==
According to ISEAS, Wang "is considered a pioneer in overseas Chinese studies and a prominent historian of China". He is a Foreign Honorary Member of the American Academy of Arts and Sciences and an Honorary Member of the Chinese Academy of Social Sciences.

- In 1970 he was elected fellow of the Australian Academy of the Humanities.
- In 1988 he was appointed Professor Emeritus of ANU.
- On 14 June 1991, Wang was made Ordinary Commander of the Civil Division of the Most Excellent Order of the British Empire (OBE), for "public and community services in Hong Kong".
- In 1994, Wang was awarded the Academic Prize of the Fukuoka Asian Culture Prize by the Japanese city of Fukuoka.
- In 2007, Wang became the third person to be named University Professor by the National University of Singapore (NUS). This is an honour "bestowed to a small number of NUS tenured faculty for their outstanding leadership to the University and community". From 2010 until 2013, he was rector for a residential college in uTown catering exclusively for the NUS University Scholars Programme.
- On 12 June 2009, he was one of ten eminent persons to receive an honorary degree to celebrate Cambridge University's 800th anniversary; he was awarded a Doctor of Letters (honoris causa).
- In 2010, a library named in his honour, the Wang Gungwu Library, was officially opened at the Chinese Heritage Centre at the Nanyang Technological University Libraries.
- In 2013, Wang received Singapore's Meritorious Service Medal.
- In 2013 the Wang Gungwu Prize, valued at $1,500, was established by the Asian Studies Association of Australia.
- In June 2018, Wang was made an Officer of the Order of Australia (AO) in the Queen's Birthday Honours List, "For distinguished service to tertiary education as an academic and researcher, particularly to far eastern history and the study of the Chinese diaspora, and to the enhancement of Australia–Asia relations".
- In June 2020 Wang was awarded the Tang Prize in Sinology. According to the National University of Singapore, Wang, who is "one of the world's foremost experts on the Chinese diaspora", was granted the prestigious award "in recognition of his trailblazing and dissecting insights on the history of the Chinese world order, overseas Chinese, and Chinese migratory experience". The Straits Times reported that the Tang Prize Foundation praised his "unique approach to understanding China by scrutinising its long and complex relation with its southern neighbours". The organisation, which is based in Taiwan, said that his work had "significantly enriched the explanation of the Chinese people's changing place in the world, traditionally developed from an internalist perspective or relation to the West".
- In August 2020, he was awarded the Distinguished Service Order in Singapore. Wang was acknowledged for his work in "developing world-class research institutions in Singapore". The award also recognised his publication of "pioneering works on the history of China, South-east Asia, and East Asia, as well as the Chinese diaspora in South-east Asia and Singapore, providing invaluable insights for policymakers".
- In July 2022, Wang was conferred the Honorary Degree of Doctor of Letters (Litt.D.) by NUS. As an NUS alumnus, Wang was lauded for "his dedication to Sinology, his remarkable intellect, his trailblazing vision, and his public contributions". The honorary doctorate celebrates the long-standing contributions and value that Wang's scholarly insights bring to Singapore, Southeast Asia, and the world.
- In 2022/23, Wang was granted the 12th S R Nathan Fellowship for the Study of Singapore by the Institute of Policy Studies, an autonomous research centre of the Lee Kuan Yew School of Public Policy.
- In November 2022, aged 91, Wang became one of the two oldest people to win the Singapore Literature Prize, the other being literary pioneer Suratman Markasan (also 91). His memoir Home Is Where We Are topped the English creative non-fiction category.

== Personal life ==
Wang married Margaret Lim Ping Ting in 1955, and they had three children. She was co-writer of his memoir Home Is Where We Are (2020), but predeceased him.

In 2018, Wang published the memoir of his early life (ending in 1949), called Home Is Not Here. Home Is Where We Are is the second part of his memoirs, and spans 20 years, beginning with Wang's time at the University of Malaya.

Wang became an Australian citizen in 1977, after 18 years of teaching in Australia, although he said in 2013 that he did not consider himself Australian because "both his understanding of Australia and the understanding of Australians about him had been superficial".

== Legacy ==
In 2010, Wang gave his collection of Southeast Asian books and private archives to ISEAS, as well as donating $150,000 to NUS to set up an academic award which bearing his name.

The annual Wang Gungwu Lecture was established by the National Foundation for Australia–China Relations in partnership with the Australian Broadcasting Corporation. The lecture series celebrates "the substantial and longstanding contributions of Chinese Australians to Australia's national story". The inaugural lecture was held in June 2022 at ABC Studios, delivered by renowned paediatrician 1996 Australian of the Year and designated National Living Treasure, John Yu. Others who have delivered the lecture include:

- January 2023: Gabrielle Wang, author
- February 2024: Ming Long, business leader and chair of Diversity Council Australia
- February 2025: Melissa Wu, Olympic diving champion

== In film ==
Wang Gungwu

Wang discussed the demise of the Qing dynasty in the 2011 film China's Century of Humiliation, directed by Mitch Anderson.

He also addresses the topic of US-China Relations during China's century of humiliation in a 2021 MOOC entitled US-China Relations: Past, Present and Future.

== Selected bibliography ==
- Wang Gungwu (1977). China and the World since 1949: The Impact of Independence, Modernity, and Revolution. New York: St. Martin's Press.
- — (1991). China and the Chinese overseas. Singapore: Times Academic Press.
- — (1992). Community and nation: China, Southeast Asia, and Australia. Kensington, NSW: Asian Studies Association of Australia.
- — (1998). The Nanhai trade: the early history of Chinese trade in the South China Sea. Singapore: Times Academic Press.
- — (1999). China and Southeast Asia: myths, threats, and culture. World Scientific.
- Wang Gungwu; Wong, John, eds. (1999). China: Two Decades of Reform and Change. World Scientific.
- Wang Gungwu (2000). Joining the modern world: inside and outside China. World Scientific.
- — (2003). Don't leave home: migration and the Chinese. Singapore: Eastern Universities Press.
- Wang Gungwu; Zheng, Yongnian, eds. (2003). Damage Control: The Chinese Communist Party in the Jiang Zemin Era. Singapore: Eastern Universities Press.
- Wang Gungwu (2003). Anglo-Chinese encounters since 1800: war, trade, science and governance. Cambridge: Cambridge University Press.
- —, ed. (2005). Nation-building: Five Southeast Asian Histories. Singapore: Institute of Southeast Asian Studies.
- Wang Gungwu (2018). Home is Not Here. Singapore: NUS Press.
- — (2019). China reconnects: joining a deep-rooted past to a new world order. Singapore: World Scientific.
- Wang Gungwu with Margaret Wang (2020). Home is Where We Are. Singapore: NUS Press.

Academic offices
| Preceded by Rayson Huang | Vice-chancellor of the University of Hong Kong; 1986–1995 | Succeeded by Cheng Yiu-chung |
