= Samoa Shipping Corporation =

Samoan government-owned company

Agency overview
- Formed: 1974
- Type: Public trading body
- Employees: 209 (in 2020)
- Annual budget: $20.6 million (in 2020)
- Minister responsible: Minister of Works, Transport & Infrastructure
- Agency executive: Leiataua Samuel Phineas, Chief Executive

The Samoa Shipping Corporation is a government-owned company in Samoa which provides freight and passenger services between Savai'i, Upolu and American Samoa. Established in 1974, the corporation is managed as a public trading body under the Public Bodies (Performance and Accountability) Act 2001.

The corporation also provides maritime support services, including engineering services in Apia and a slipway at Satitoa in Aleipata. It maintains facilities at Mulifanua, Salelologa, Apia and Pago Pago.

== History ==
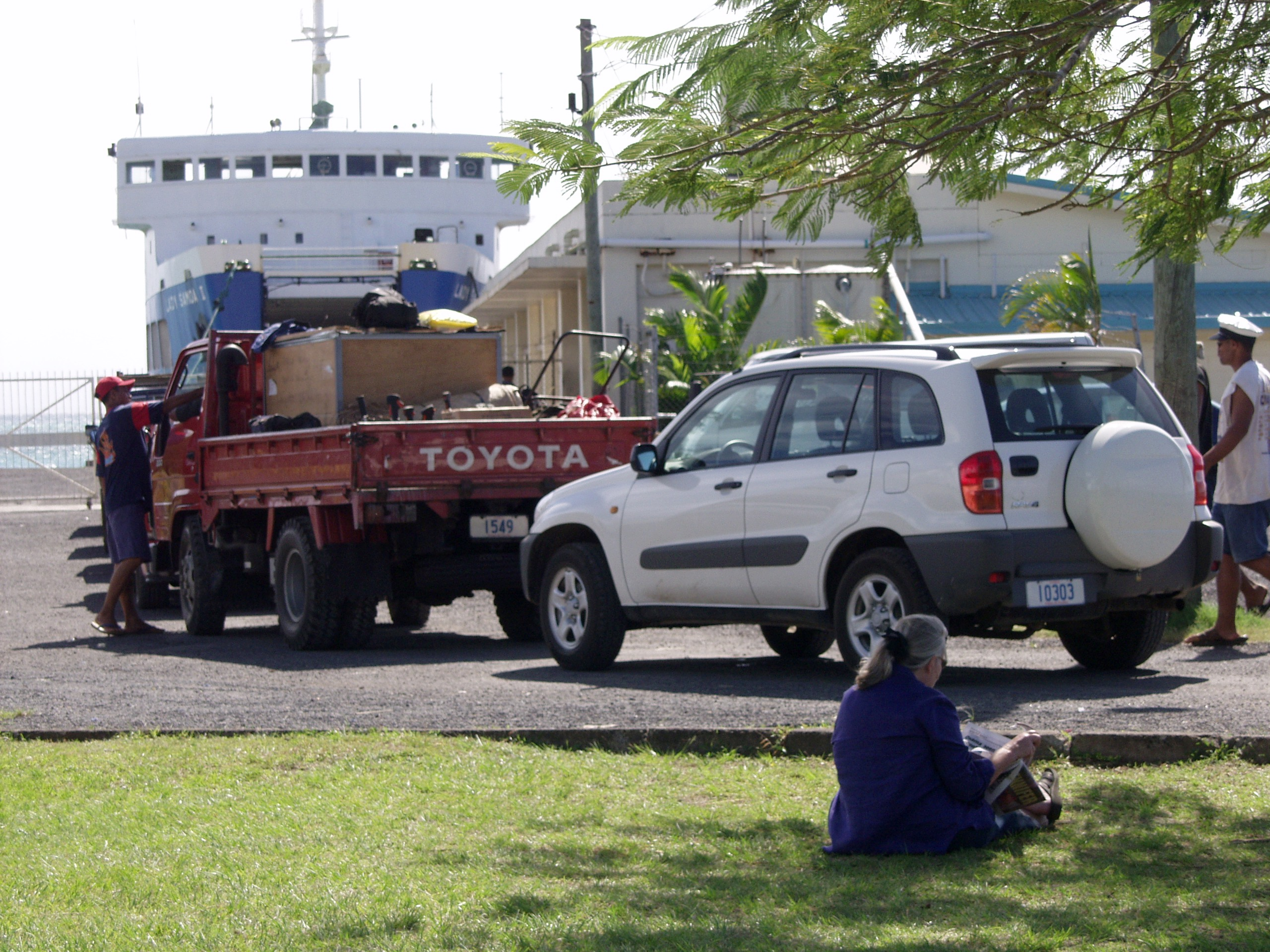
MV Lady Samoa II at the Mulifanua ferry terminal

The corporation was initially funded by overseas aid. In 1974 the New Zealand government provided NZ$450,000 for the construction of a roll-on/roll-off ferry terminal at Mulifanua. In 1977 the Australian government provided a ferry, the MV Queen Salamasina. The company was unprofitable for its first twenty years, and gained a reputation for inefficiency. In 1985 it bought a "luxury boat", only to sell it back to the original owners just two years later for less than it had paid for it. It finally started delivering dividends to the government in the late 1990's. In 2001 it expanded its fleet, adding the Samoa Express on the Apia - Tokelau route.

In 2008 the company constructed a wharf and slipway at Satitoa in Aleipata to reduce travel time to American Samoa and allow vessels to be maintained locally. The new terminal was unpopular with exporters, and services were shifted back to Apia after the Lady Naomi was damaged due to the dock not being deep enough.

In 2011 it opened its engineering facility in Apia. In 2012 it began providing bimonthly services to the Northern Cook Islands and to Tokelau.

In 2019 - 2020 the company made a profit of $332,000, which was reduced due to the 2019 Samoa measles outbreak.

== Fleet ==
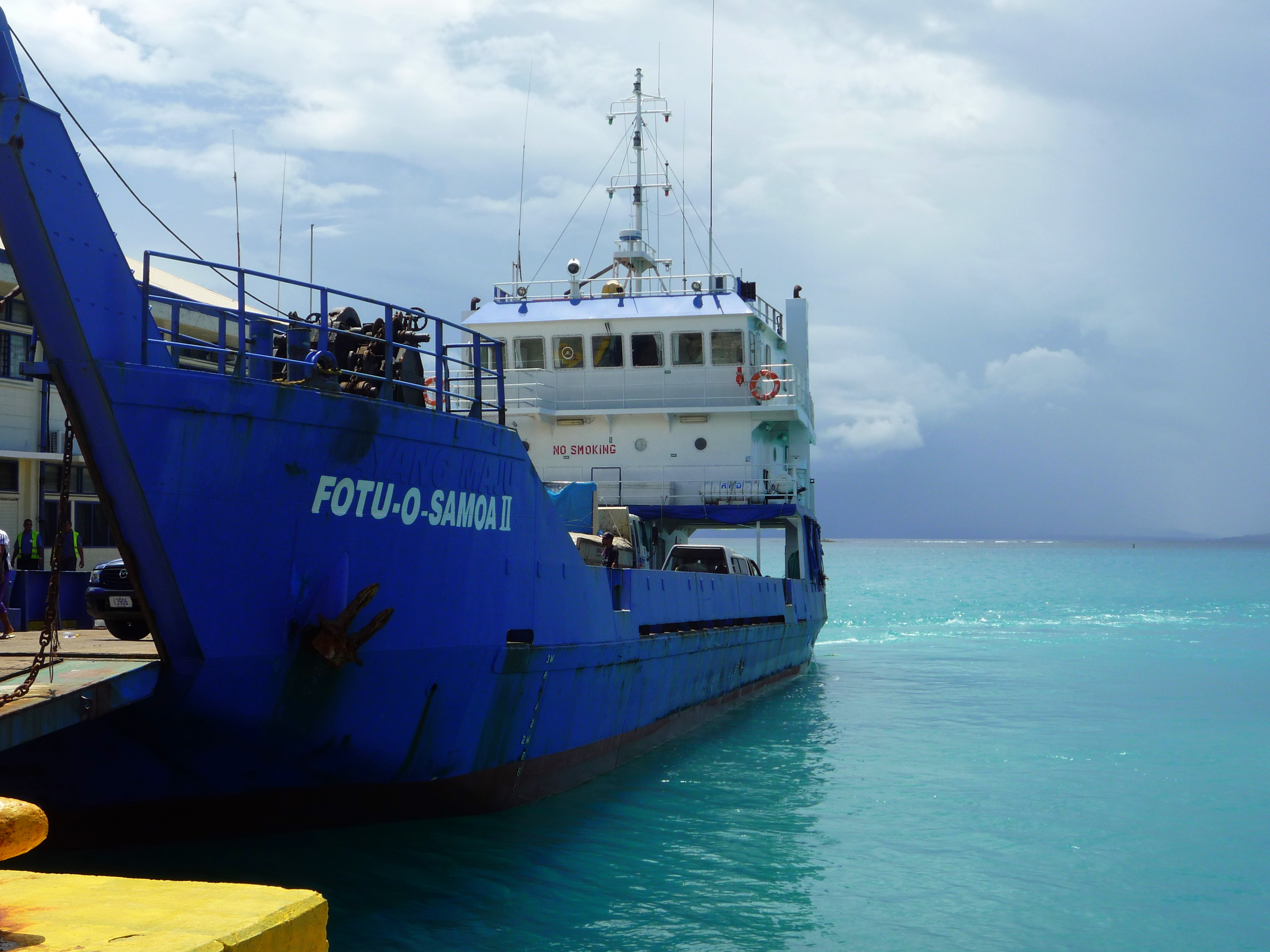
MV Fotu o Samoa II

=== Current ===
Samoa Shipping currently operates five vessels:

- MV Lady Naomi (since 1999)
- MV Lady Samoa III (since 2010)
- MV Fotu o Samoa II
- MV Fasefulu (since 2015)
- MV Samoa Express II (since 2021)

=== Past ===
- MV Limulimutau
- MV Queen Salamasina (1977—1999)
- MV Puleono (1978—?)
- MV Salafai
- MV Tausala Samoa
- MV Lady Samoa (1985—1987)
- MV Fotu o Samoa
- MV Lady Samoa II
- MV Pacifica Express (ex-MV Tokelau) (2013—2022)
- MV Samoa Express (2001—2021)
