= East Asian Institute (Singapore) =

Singaporean research institute

Coordinates: 1.3195°N 103.8150°E

- Abbreviation: EAI
- Formation: 1997
- Type: Research institute, think tank
- Chairman: Teh Kok Peng
- Director: Alfred Schipke
- Website: research.nus.edu.sg/eai/

The East Asian Institute (EAI) is an autonomous research institute and think tank of the National University of Singapore (NUS), that focuses on the political, social, and economic development in East and Southeast Asia. It is the successor to the Institute of East Asian Political Economy (IEAPE), which succeeded the Institute of East Asian Philosophies (IEAP; founded 1983).

As of 2022, the institute's chairman and director are Teh Kok Peng and Bert Hofman respectively.

== History ==
The institute was founded in April 1997. It succeeded the former Institute of East Asian Political Economy (IEAPE). The IEAPE was itself the successor of the Institute of East Asian Philosophies, founded in 1983 for the study of Confucianism by Goh Keng Swee, the Minister for Education and Deputy Prime Minister of Singapore.

The Institute of East Asian Philosophies (IEAP) was formed after a panel of scholars was asked by the Government to make recommendations on the teaching of Confucian ethics to secondary school students. It received a donation of $3 million from a Hong Kong industrialist, John Tung, who also joined the institute's board. Several prominent scholars based in other countries, such as Tu Wei-ming and Yu Ying Shih, served as board members of the institute and consultants on the development of the teaching curriculum. The scholar and academic Wu Teh Yao was a director of the IEAP.
