= Ifoga =

Samoan ceremony

Ifoga is a Samoan ceremony of apology, in which one party ritually and publicly humiliates themselves and offers a gift of ʻIe tōga (fine mats) in exchange for forgiveness by another. It is a part of traditional dispute resolution between families in Faʻa Sāmoa where mediation has failed. The term comes from the word ifo, "to bow down".

== Ritual ==
In an ifoga, the party seeking forgiveness sits before the house of the wronged party and is then covered up by fine mats. Traditionally this is done under cover of darkness, with the party seeking forgiveness bringing firewood, stones, and banana leaves (required for an earth oven). Forgiveness is given when the wronged party removes the mats, and this is followed by exchanges of speeches and gifts. While traditionally an ifoga could result in prolonged waiting, or even be rejected, in contemporary Samoa it is almost always accepted quickly.

== Contemporary use ==
Ifoga are sometimes offered by the perpetrators of violent crimes such as murder or manslaughter. While this has no effect on whether a crime is prosecuted, it may be taken into account at sentencing as a show of remorse. They are also used by the families of offenders to apologise to the families of victims of violent crime. Human rights acitivst Maluseu Doris Tulifau has also spoken out on how ifoga is not suitable for use in cases of domestic violence.

In the aftermath of the 2021 Samoan constitutional crisis when the HRPP government was refusing to allow opposition MPs to be sworn into parliament, Catholic Archbishop Alapati Lui Mataeliga performed an ifoga outside the Legislative Assembly of Samoa in order to seek peace.

In August 2021, New Zealand Prime Minister Jacinda Ardern performed an ifoga to seek the forgiveness of the New Zealand-Samoan community for the Dawn Raids. This was the first time the ifoga had been performed by a world leader.

== See also ==
- Samoan culture
- Faʻa Sāmoa
- Hoʻoponopono
