= Vaai =

Vaai or Vaʻai is a Samoan given name and surname that may refer to the following people:

- Lesatele Rapi Vaai, Samoan judge
- Olo Fiti Vaai, Samoan politician
- Vaepule Alo Vaemoa Vaai (1953—2020), Samoan lawyer and judge
- Lautimuia Uelese Vaʻai (born 1968 or 1969), Samoan politician
- Vaʻai Kolone (1911–2001), prime minister of Samoa
- Vaʻai Papu Vailupe (1944– 2022), Samoan politician
- Vaai Taumalolo Rugby League Footballer
