= ʻIe tōga =

Samoan special finely woven mat

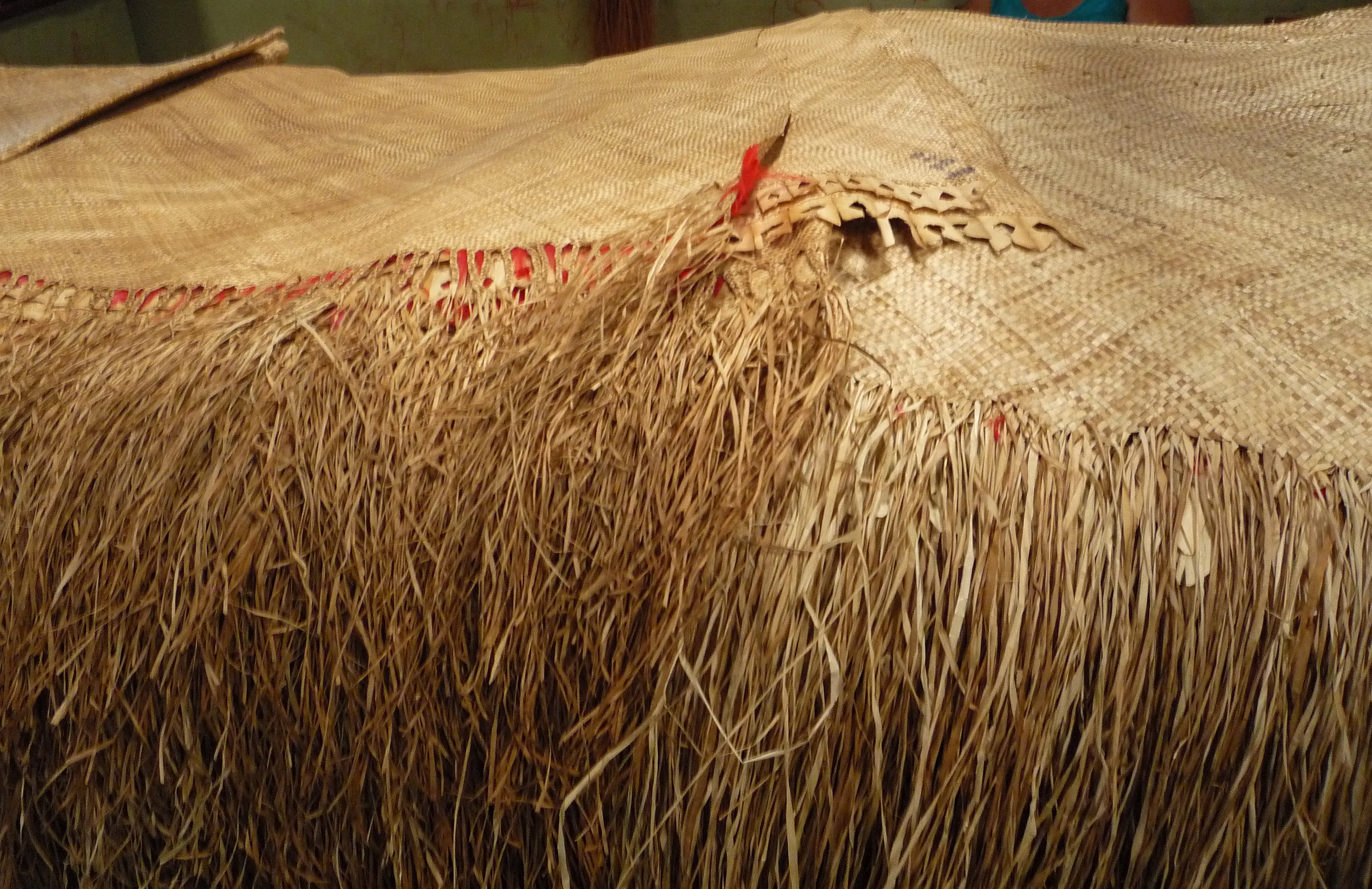
Common type of ʻie toga with a coarse weave sold at a market in Samoa.

An ʻie tōga (Note: not standardized spelling: "ʻie toga" sans macron ("faʻamamafa").) is a special finely woven mat that is an important item of cultural value in Samoa. They are commonly referred to in English as "fine mats" although they are never used as mats as they only have a purely cultural value. ʻIe tōga are valued by the quality of the weave and the softness and shine of the material. They are made by women and form an important part of their role, identity and skill in their community.

ʻIe tōga have an unwoven fringe and a strip of red feathers. They are important in gift exchanges during cultural ceremonies and events including matai chief title bestowals, weddings and funerals. In this way, ʻie tōga are passed from family to family, sometimes for many years and are greatly valued. Historically, some ʻie tōga were so valuable they were given their own names. The process of making a fine ʻie tōga can take months of work and have been known to take years. The completion of ʻie tōga can involve a public celebration and presentation with the women parading and displaying their fine mats for all to see.

== Cultural value ==
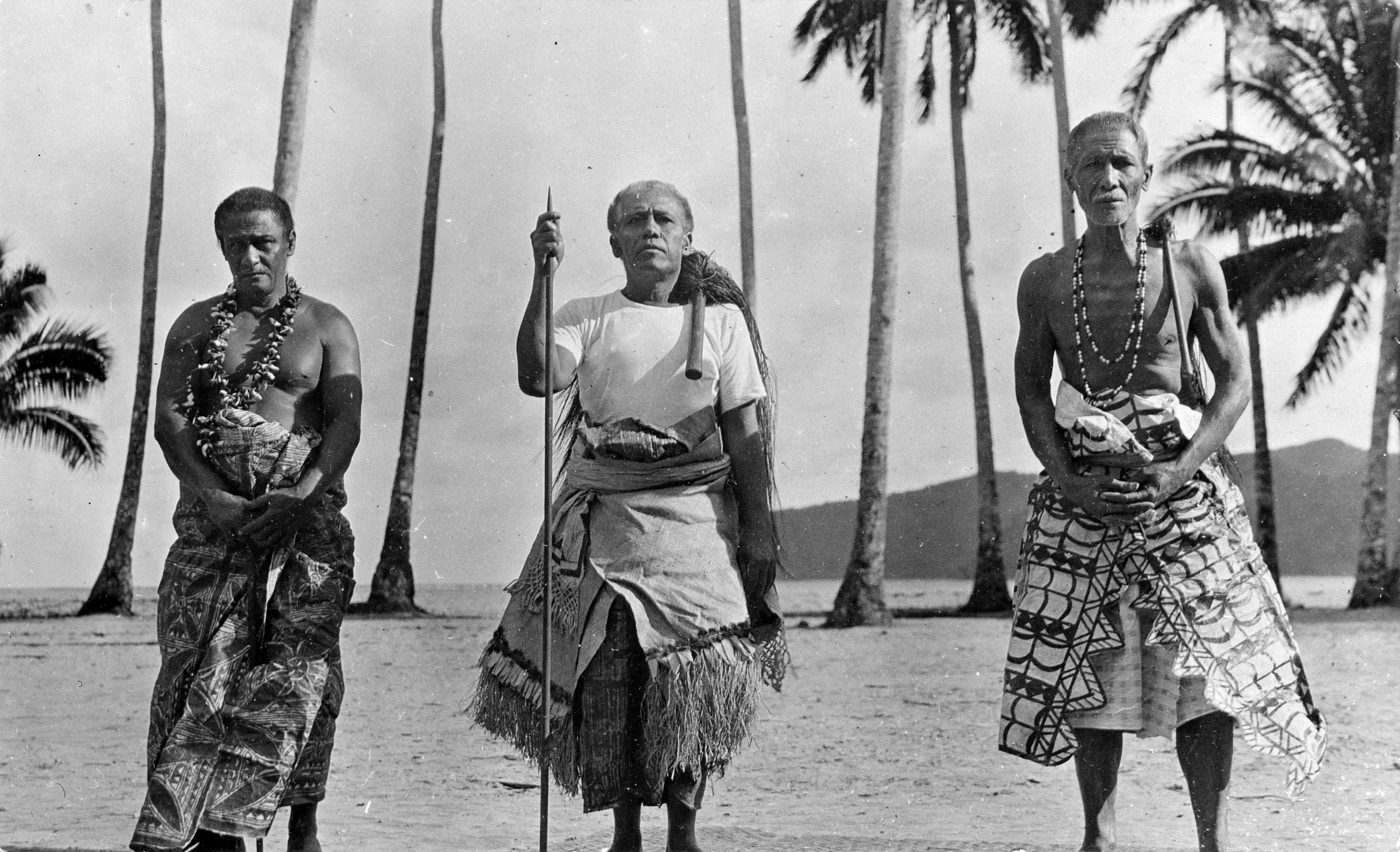
Three matai chiefs, the two older men bearing the symbols of orator status – the fue (flywhisk made of organic sennit rope with a wooden handle) over their left shoulder. The central elder holds the orator's wooden staff (toʻotoʻo) of office. His garment is an ʻie tōga. The other two men wear tapa cloth with patterned designs.

ʻIe tōga are never used as an actual floor mat in the western sense, functioning only as an item of cultural value. They are considered the most precious item in ceremony and gift exchanges, important in faʻa-Sāmoa. They represent most of the traditional wealth of Samoan families. They are exchanged and presented at weddings and funerals, and at special occasions such as the blessing of a newly built fale (house) or the opening of a new church. ʻIe tōga are sometimes worn at special occasions, around the waist, similar to a lavalava. At funerals ʻie tōga are given to the family of the deceased and gifts of mats and food are given in return. These exchanges display a mutual respect that enforces family (ʻaiga) ties.

== Process ==
The best quality of ʻie tōga are made from a variety of long leaved pandanus known as lauʻie. More common types of 'ie toga with a coarser weave are made from laufala, a variety of pandanus which has a darker green colour than the lauʻie plant. The pandanus are grown in village plantations. The long leaves are selected and cut from the plant and taken back to the village. The leaves are prepared by soaking in boiling water followed by drying and bleaching in the sun. Once dry, the leaves are rolled and tied into bundles in preparation for weaving. The long dried leaves are then slit into thin strips for weaving. In the 19th century, young women would start their own mats or complete ones started by older sisters. Today, it is more common for mats to be woven by a group of women working in a fale lalaga (weaving house). The decorative red feathers were originally from Samoan or Fijian collared lory birds, called "sega," but more modern examples use dyed chicken feathers.

== Etymology ==
The word tōga is cognate to Māori: taonga “treasure, property” and Tongan: tōʻonga “custom, habit, conduct, behaviour, characteristic; rite, ceremony”. Native speakers habitually recognize the proper pronunciation, but given the commonly unaccented spelling "toga", it is common to see the term misspelled thus later associated with "Toga," the Samoan spelling of Tonga. Hence the inaccurate explanation that "ʻie tōga" means "Tongan mat." The actual translation of "tōga" is "treasured" or "valuable" and the term also refers collectively to prestige goods produced by women for ceremonial exchanges. Conversely, men's goods produced for such exchanges were traditionally called "ʻoloa." This usage is corroborated in Tonga where these types of fine mats are referred to as "kie Haʻamoa" (Samoan mat) and "kie hingoa" ("named mats"), from the Samoan tradition of giving especially precious mats titular names. The Tongan cognate of "ʻie tōga" is "kie tōʻonga," while " ʻoloa" and "koloa" are also cognates.

== See also ==
- Ta'ovala, Tongan dress and fine mat.
- Fa'a Samoa, Samoan culture and way of life.
- Fa'amatai, chiefly system of Samoa.
- Culture of Samoa
- Architecture of Samoa
