= Culture of Samoa =

The traditional culture of Samoa is a communal way of life based on Fa'a Samoa, the unique socio-political culture. In Samoan culture, most activities are done together. The traditional living quarters, or fale (houses), contain no walls and up to 20 people may sleep on the ground in the same fale. During the day, the fale is used for chatting and relaxing. One's family is viewed as an integral part of a person's life. The aiga or extended family lives and works together. Elders in the family are greatly respected and hold the highest status, and this may be seen at a traditional Sunday umu (normal oven).

Samoan culture is present in both the Independent State of Samoa and in American Samoa (a territory of the United States).

== Traditional art forms ==
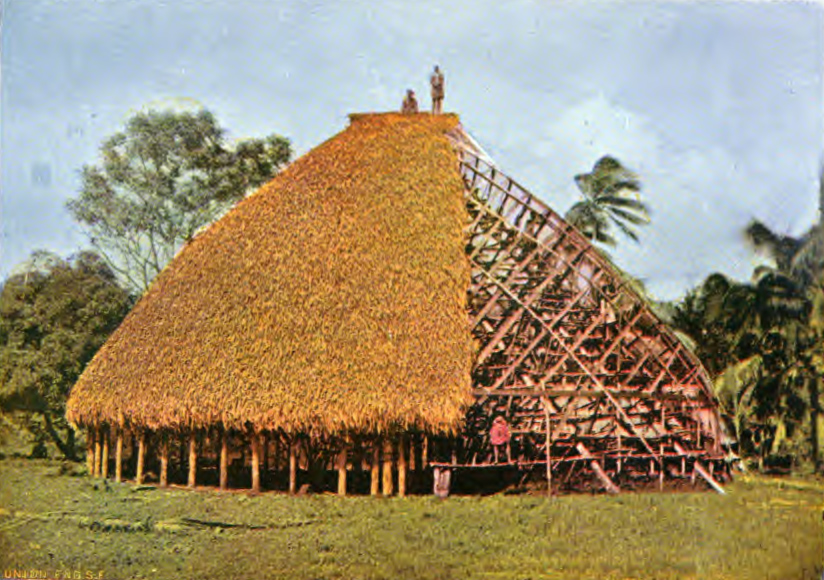
Construction of a Samoan fale, c. 1896 (see: Architecture of Samoa)

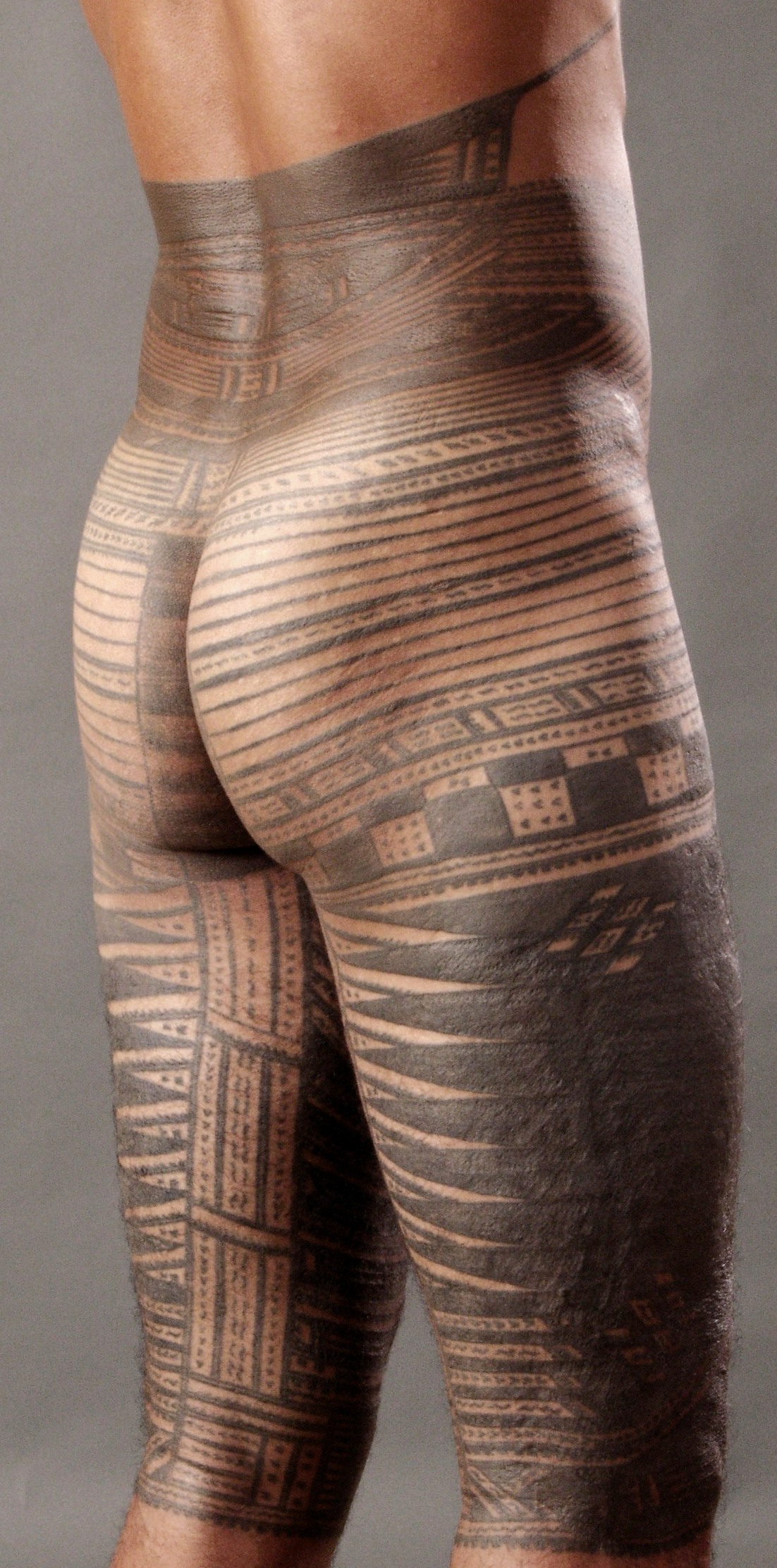
Pe'a, traditional male tattoo

Both men and women can be tattooed (tatau). A man's tattoo is called the soga'i miki while a woman's tattoo is called a malu.

Women played a very important part in contributing with their skills in items of important cultural value including 'ie toga, finely woven mats used in ceremony and gift exchanges. In terms of material goods, during ritual exchange, women give fine mats 'ie toga and decorated bark cloth siapo while men give woodworking items and red feathers.

Bark cloth, called siapo in Samoa (similar to the Fijian tapa cloth called masi), both of which is made from beaten mulberry bark. Patterns or pictures are painted on with a natural brown dye taken from a tree source. These pictures typically depict abstract and realistic depictions of plant life, shells, fish, turtles, and hibiscus flowers. The siapo may be used for clothing, for wrapping objects and even simply for decorative reasons. Ornaments, jewellery and hair accessories are made from naturally occurring materials such as sea shells, coconut and coir. Traditional Samoan medicine is often practiced as a first-line before hospital medicine. This is a type of alternative medicine using plant leaves to massage the affected area.

Wooden figurative sculpture was extremely rare in pre-Christian Samoa, and shares some similarities with Fijian and Tongan sculpture.

=== 'Ava ceremony ===
The 'ava ceremony is the most significant ritual which takes place before all important occasions, including the bestowal of matai chiefly titles. The overall ceremony is highly ritualized, with specific gestures and phrases to be used at various times. Ceremonial items for the 'ava ceremony include the tanoa (round wooden bowl) similar to those used in the kava cultures of other Polynesian societies. The tanoa are made of varying sizes supported by many short legs around it. These bowls and other related instruments are often highly decorated. Known as kava in other parts of Polynesia, the 'ava is a beverage produced from a plant that is drunk throughout the western Pacific region. The drinking of ʻava in Samoa is generally done through highly ritualized ʻava ceremonies. The kava is prepared by a group of people called aumaga. It is brought to each participant by the tautuaʻava, or ʻava server, in the order proscribed by the tufaʻava, or ʻava distributor. Usually, the highest chief of the visiting party is served first, followed by the highest chief of the host party, and then service proceeds based on the rank of the rest of the participants. The drink is served in a polished coconut half shell.

== Dance ==
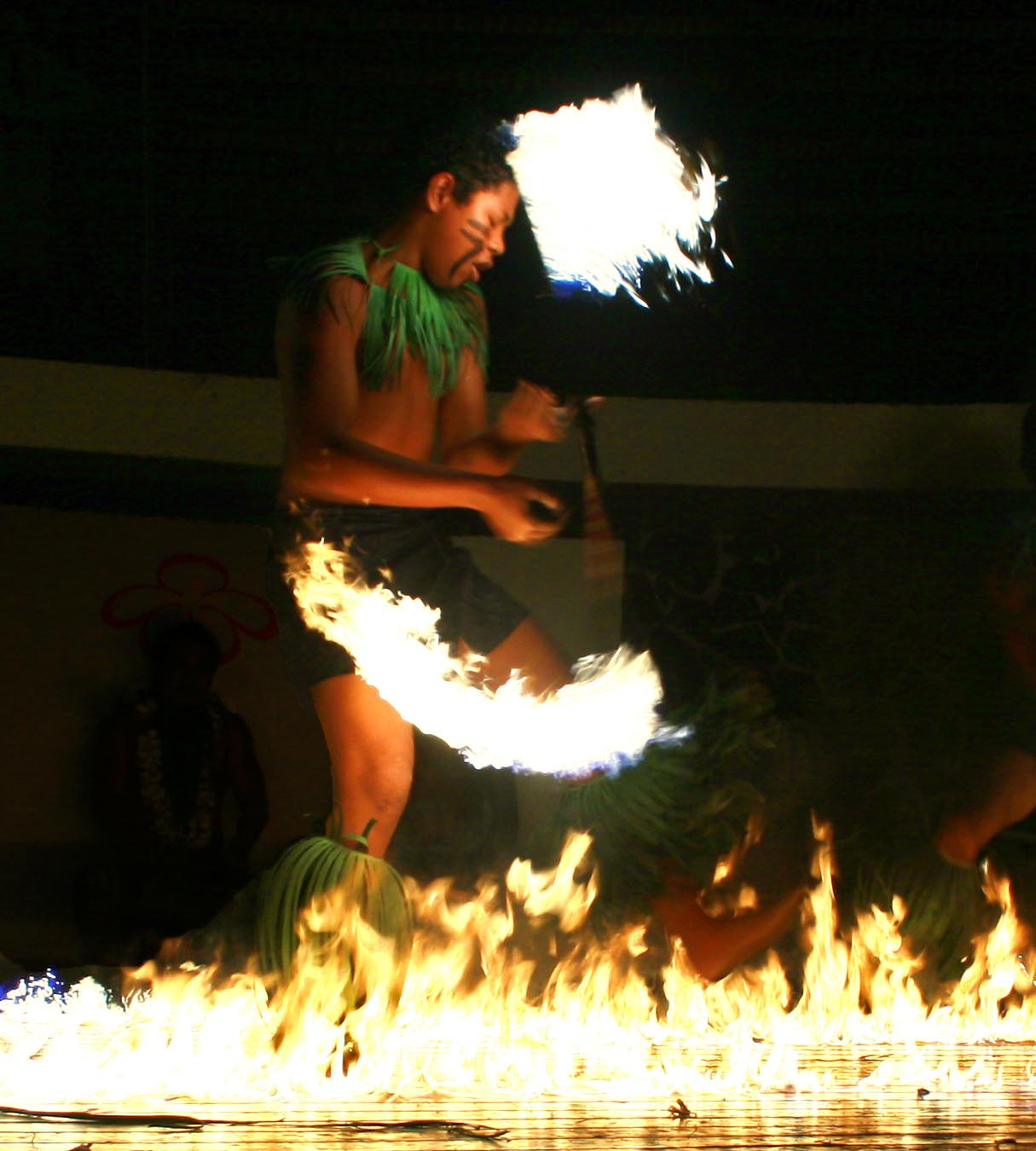
Boy performing a Samoan fire dance (siva afi)

The traditional Samoan dance is the siva. The female siva is with gentle movements of the hands and feet in time to music. The sasa is a group dance performed sitting to a drum rhythm. Samoan males traditionally perform the fa'ataupati (slap dance), usually performed in a group with no music accompaniment. Other types of dance are modern dance by the younger generations. Traditional Samoan dance is arguably the one area of Samoan culture that has not been touched by Western Civilization. The maulu'ulu is a group dance performed by female counterparts only, also the taualuga is the main Samoan traditional dance that is performed by a village chief (manaia) or village chiefess (taupou). It is often performed at weddings, birthdays and other Samoan celebrations.

In the Samoan culture the Taualuga is used for special celebrations, started by the village chief's son (manaia) or village chief's daughter (taupou). The Tuiga is a Samoan traditional headpiece (crown) that is made out of things like feathers, human hair, and a variety of different types of shells. It is now a privilege to wear the Tuiga because in the 19th century it was only to be worn by the high chief's son, daughter, and also by extended families. Before they start the taualuga, he or she must bow their head and spread out their hands to the people, to thank the people for coming out and for their support. This happens before and after the taualuga. The outfit is made from fine woven mats that symbolizes time, honor, and traditions, then we add red feathers from the birds of the islands. Next the outfit with a Tapa is made from the bark of the tree and it represents the art and the craft of the Samoan culture. Then there was the Ula Nifo, a necklace made from whale-tooth that is worn by the head chief or by the person who dances the taualuga. It was also a symbol of wealth. Finally, the meaning of the dance. Back in Samoa in the 19th century the person who performed the dance was the high chief's son or daughter that was a virgin.

== Languages ==
In American Samoa, most people are bilingual; they speak both English and Samoan. People in Samoa are also bilingual, but Samoan is stronger and more widely spoken, although the inhabitants of Swains Island speak Tokelauan.

== Names ==
The meaning of a given name is important when naming a child in the Samoan community:

- personal traits: Malosi (strong), Umi (tall), Vave (fast), Fa'avalevale (foolish)
- religious: Toefuata'iga o le talalelei (restoration of the Gospel)
- events: Dodiana (this name was created to commemorate Dodi Fayed and Princess Diana's death)
- objects: Tala (dollar) "selegi"(quarter) "lima sege" (nickel) "sefulu sene" (dime)
- animals: Maile (dog) pusi(cat) pusi feai (wildcat) lioga(lion) aeto(eagle)
- descriptive: Leilani (heavenly flower)
- traditional: Pua'a'elo (this was the name of a Samoan high chief)

== Dress ==
Casual day to day wear will usually comprise an i.e. lava lava and T-shirt with jandals for shoes (also known as thongs in other regions of the world). Shorts are an alternative to an i.e. lava lava.

For events or work attire, the traditional ladies clothing is the puletasi which is a matching skirt and tunic with Samoan designs. The lava-lava is a sarong which may be worn by men or women. They are of different patterns and colors, but tend to be plain for men who may wear it as part of an official uniform. Some men have intricate and geometrical patterns that are tattooed onto their lower body and upper legs. The tattooing process is performed without any anaesthesia and is extremely painful. Ceremonial attire includes a headdress called tuiga which is made of shells and feathers.

== Cuisine ==
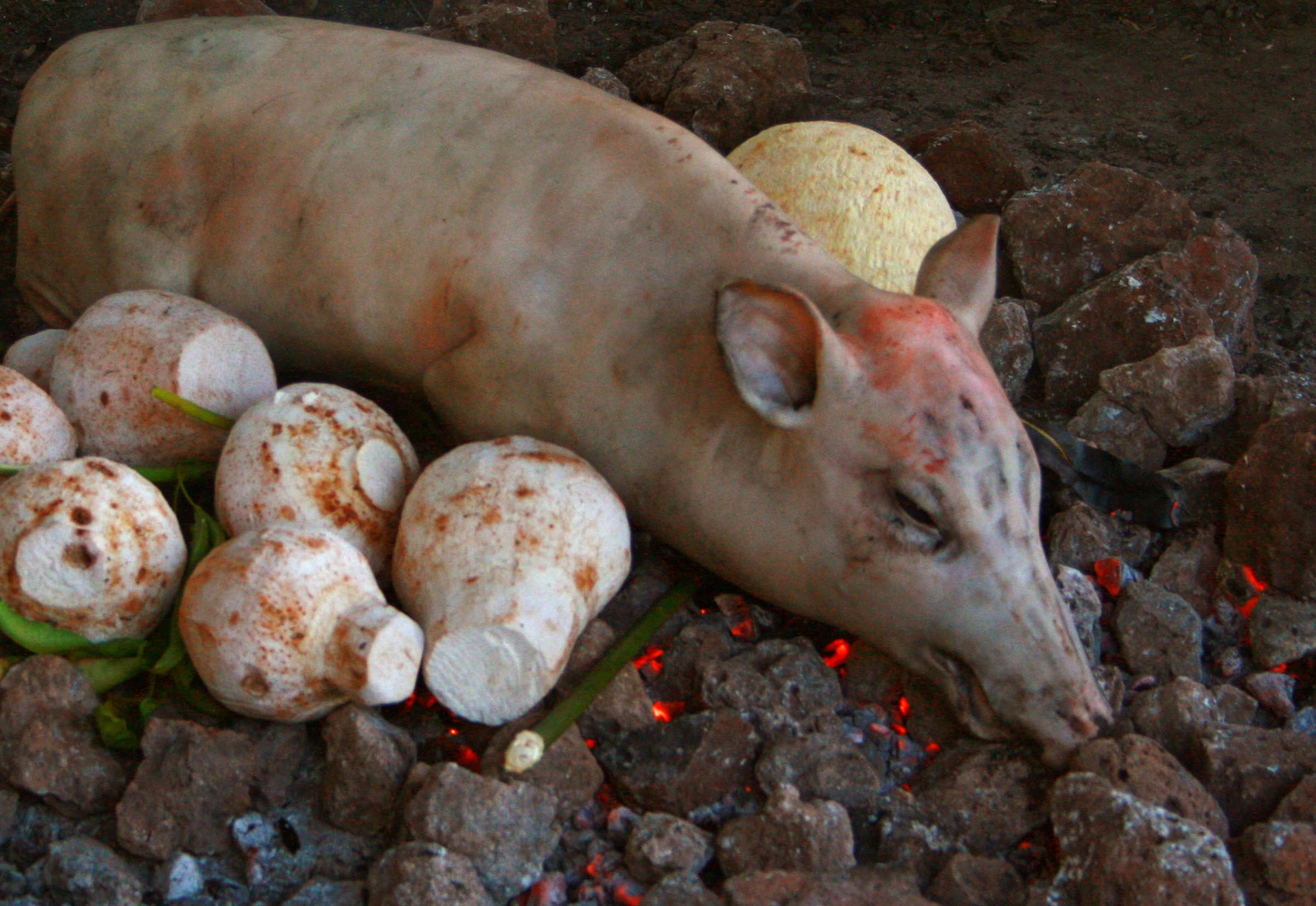
Samoan umu, an oven of hot rocks above ground

Sundays are traditionally a day of rest, and many families congregate to share an umu together for a Sunday afternoon meal. In a traditional household, the older members of the family will sit and eat first, and as the meal continues the younger members and then children are invited to eat. The umu contains an abundance and variety of dishes ranging from a whole pig, fresh seaweed and crayfish to baked taro and rice. Coconut appears in many Samoan dishes, for example, luau, a parcel of coconut cream wrapped in taro leaves baked in the umu. This dish is eaten in its entirety including the leaves and is rich in taste due to its coconut content. The green young coconut is a main ingredient in samilolo, a kind of sauce made using the flesh and sea water that is cooked inside the nut on an open flame and then fermented, usually within the palolo fishing season. Breadfruit is often roasted to serve on its own or eaten with stone-cooked coconut sauce (‘ulu pe‘epe‘e), or shaped into balls (taufolo); any surplus could be preserved as masi.

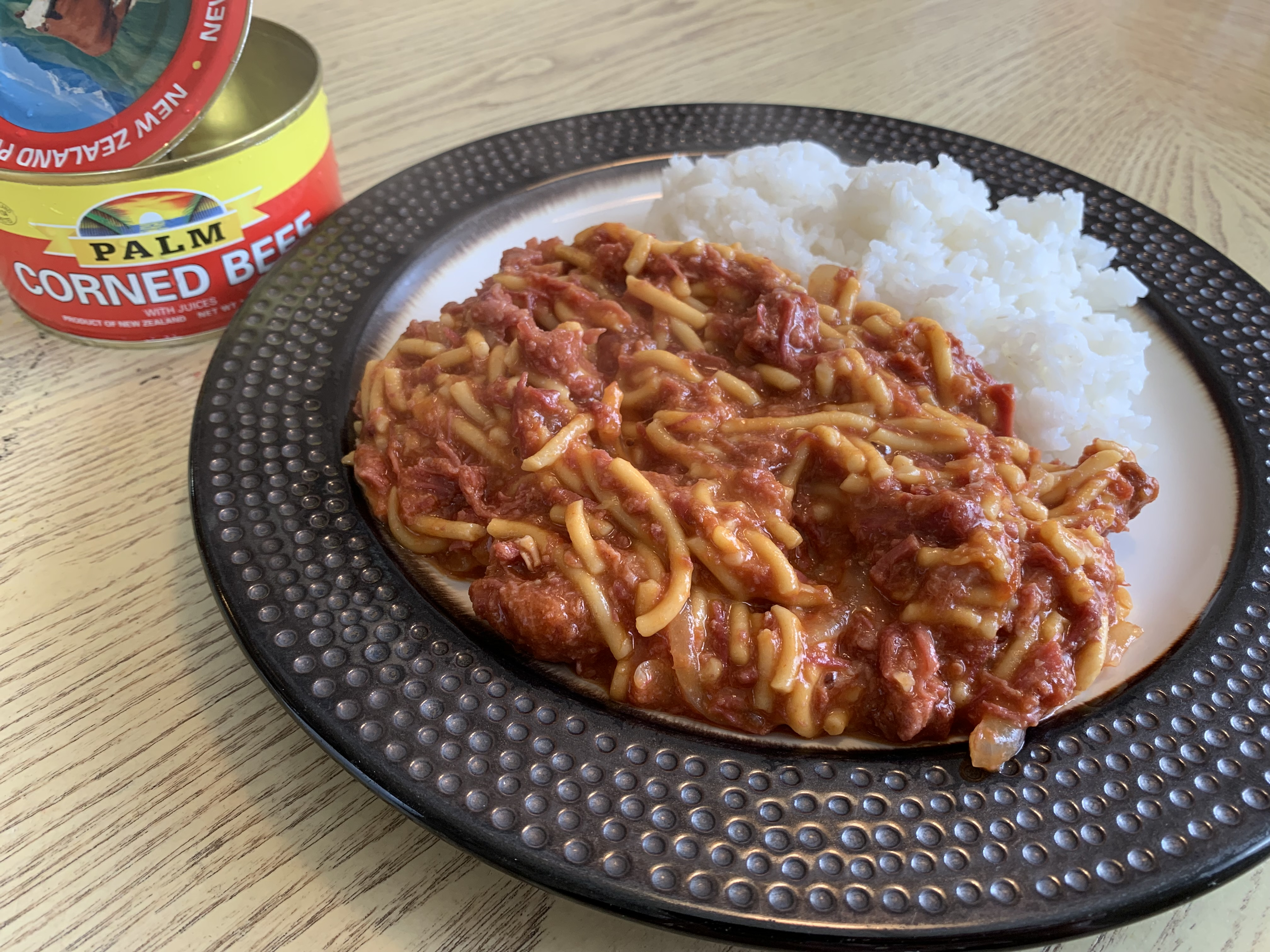
Pisupo and supoketi served with white rice

A staple of the modern Samoan diet is pisupo, or canned corned beef. Commonly imported from New Zealand or Australia, pisupo is conventionally served alongside white rice or alaisa fa'apopo (coconut rice), combined with vegetables and noodles to make sapasui, simmered with taro leaves in coconut milk as in palusami, or mixed with supoketi (cooked spaghetti). The word pisupo is derived from pea soup, which was one of the first canned foods introduced to the island in the 19th century. Today, the word is applied more generically to all foods preserved in cans, especially corned beef, which has become incorporated into the daily social and gastronomic life of Samoans. On occasions such as weddings and birthdays, it has become commonplace to receive cans of corned beef as gifts. Critics claim that pisupo represents a form of "food colonialism" wherein Western dietary standards displace those of the indigenous populations of the South Pacific, creating a dependence on foreign trade and the importation of processed goods. In recent years, pisupo has been targeted for contributing to an emerging health crisis in Samoa, which has seen a steady increase in obesity and diabetes since the 1960s. It was projected that, by 2020, 59% of men and 81% of women in Samoa would be classified as obese. Nutritionists have pointed to the influx of imported processed foods, sugary beverages, and rice as contributing to the rise in obesity and diabetes in the island. Canned corned beef, in particular, is high in saturated fat, sodium, and cholesterol and, like many processed foods, is linked to hypertension.

Samoa is also notable among Polynesian nations for its successful cultivation and acculturation of cocoa (koko) whether made into a beverage or cooked as part of a rice pudding known as "cocoa rice" (koko alaisa).

== Religion ==
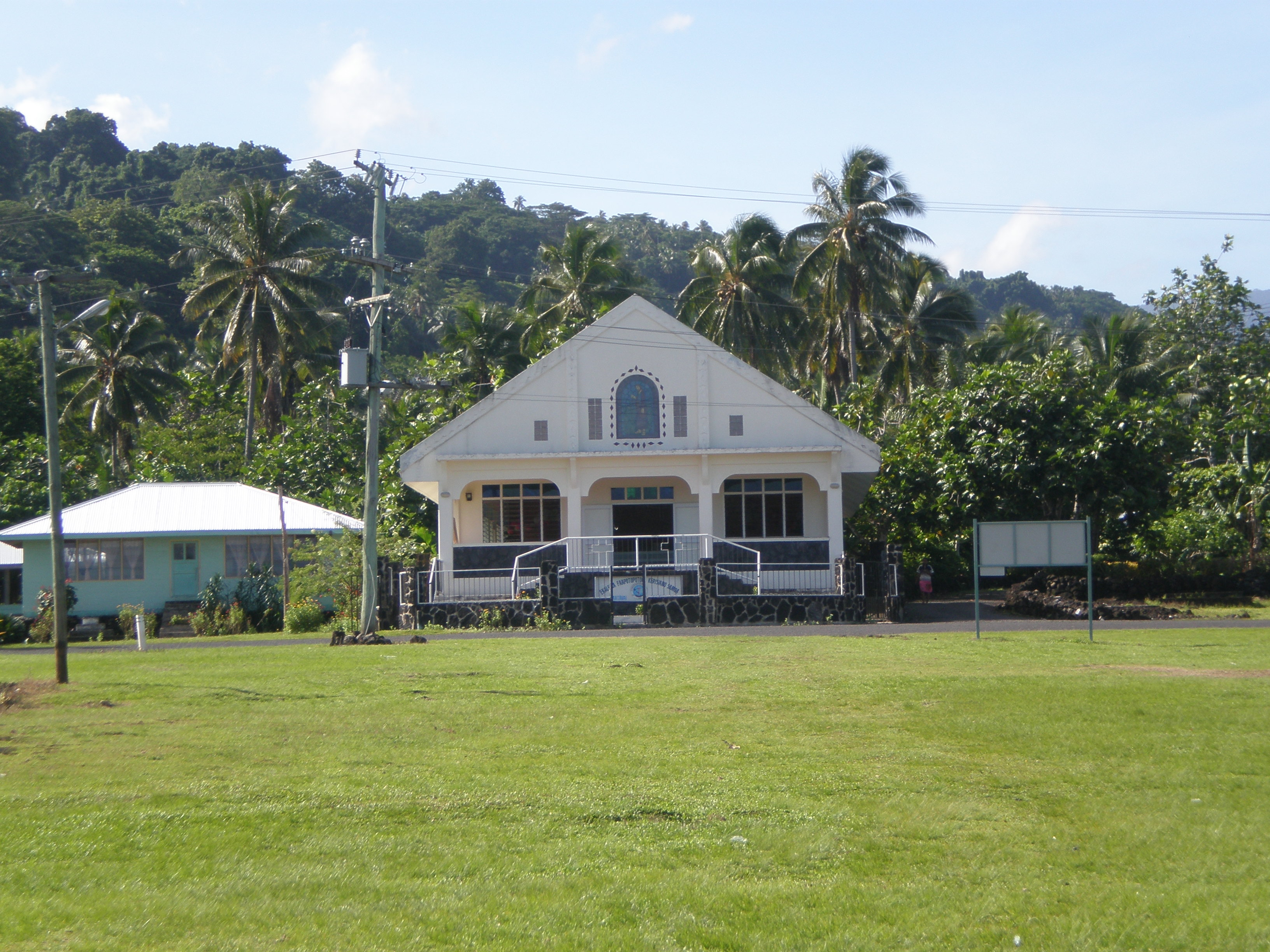
A church in Matavai village, Savai'i

Religion in Samoa encompasses a range of groups, but nearly 100% of the population in Samoa is Christian. The 2001 Census revealed the following distribution of Christian groups: Congregational Christian, 34.8 percent; Roman Catholic, 19.6 percent; Methodist, 15 percent; The Church of Jesus Christ of Latter-day Saints, 12.7 percent; Assemblies of God, 6.6 percent; and Seventh-day Adventist, 3.5 percent. These statistics reflected continual growth in the number and size of Mormons and Assemblies of God and a relative decline in the membership of the historically larger denominations. The following groups constitute less than 5 percent of the population: Nazarene, Anglican, Congregational Church of Jesus, Worship Centre, Jehovah's Witnesses, Full Gospel, Peace Chapel, Elim Church, Voice of Christ, and Baptist.

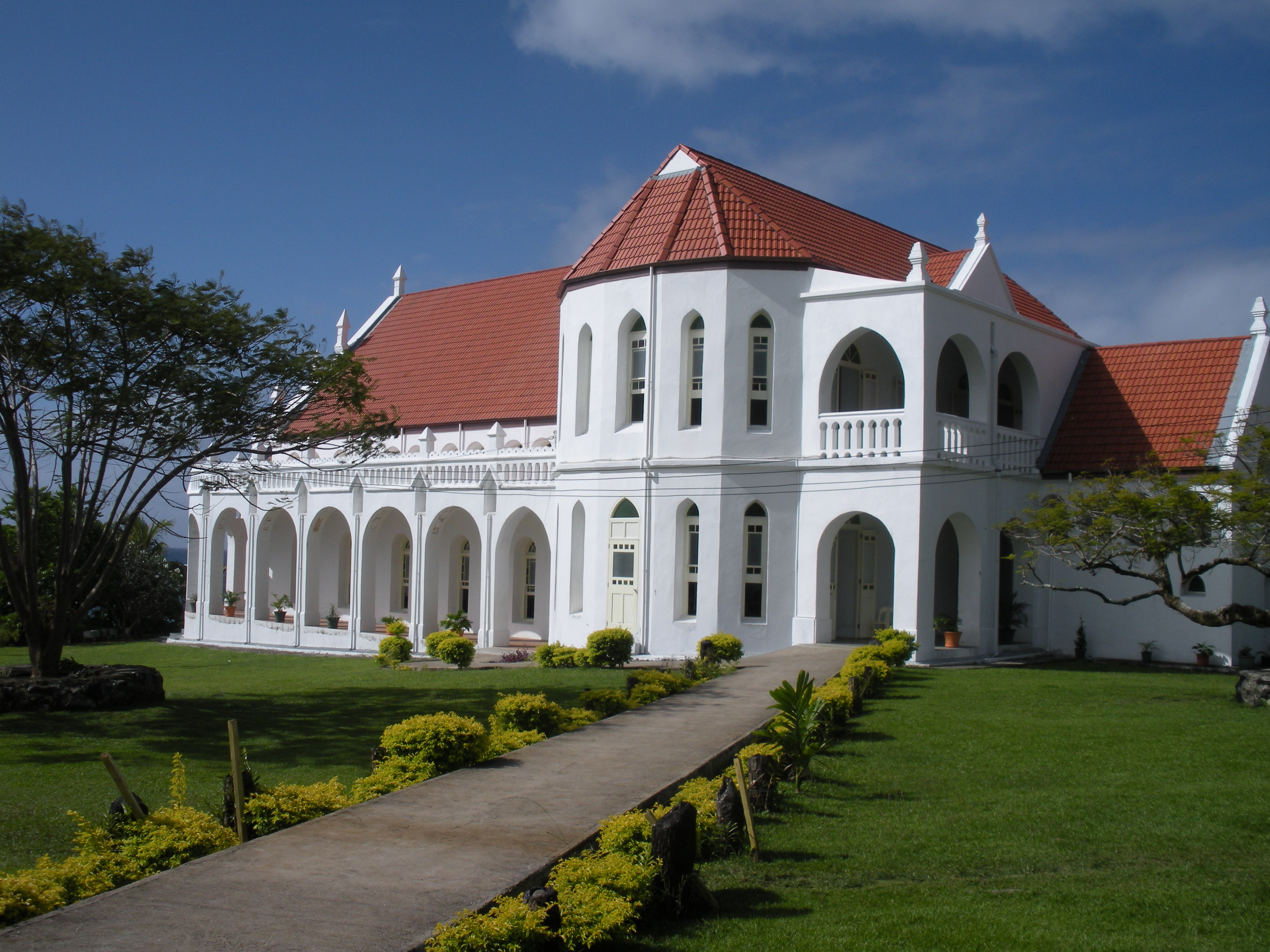
Historic Methodist Chapel at Piula Theological College on Upolu island

There are also members of other religions such as Islam and the Baháʼí Faith; the shared estimate of the Baháʼí population in Samoa circa 2000 according to a profile by the World Council of Churches and the online encyclopedia Encarta was 2% of the nation—some 3600 people—and the only non-Christian community of any number. The country hosts one of only seven Baháʼí Houses of Worship in the world. The Baháʼí Houses of Worship was dedicated by Malietoa Tanumafili II, King of Samoa (1913–2007), who was the first reigning Bahá'í monarch. Although there were no official data, it is generally believed that there are also some practicing Hindus, Buddhists, and Jews in the capital city.

All religious groups are multiethnic; none are composed exclusively of foreign nationals or native-born (Western) Samoans. There are no sizable foreign national or immigrant groups, with the exception of U.S. nationals from American Samoa. Missionaries operated freely within the country. There is strong societal pressure at the village and local level to participate in church services and other activities, and financially support church leaders and projects. In some denominations, such financial contributions often total more than 30 percent of family income. The constitution provides for freedom of religion, and the government generally respected this right in practice. The US government found there to be no reports of societal abuses or discrimination based on religious belief or practice in 2007.

== Sports ==
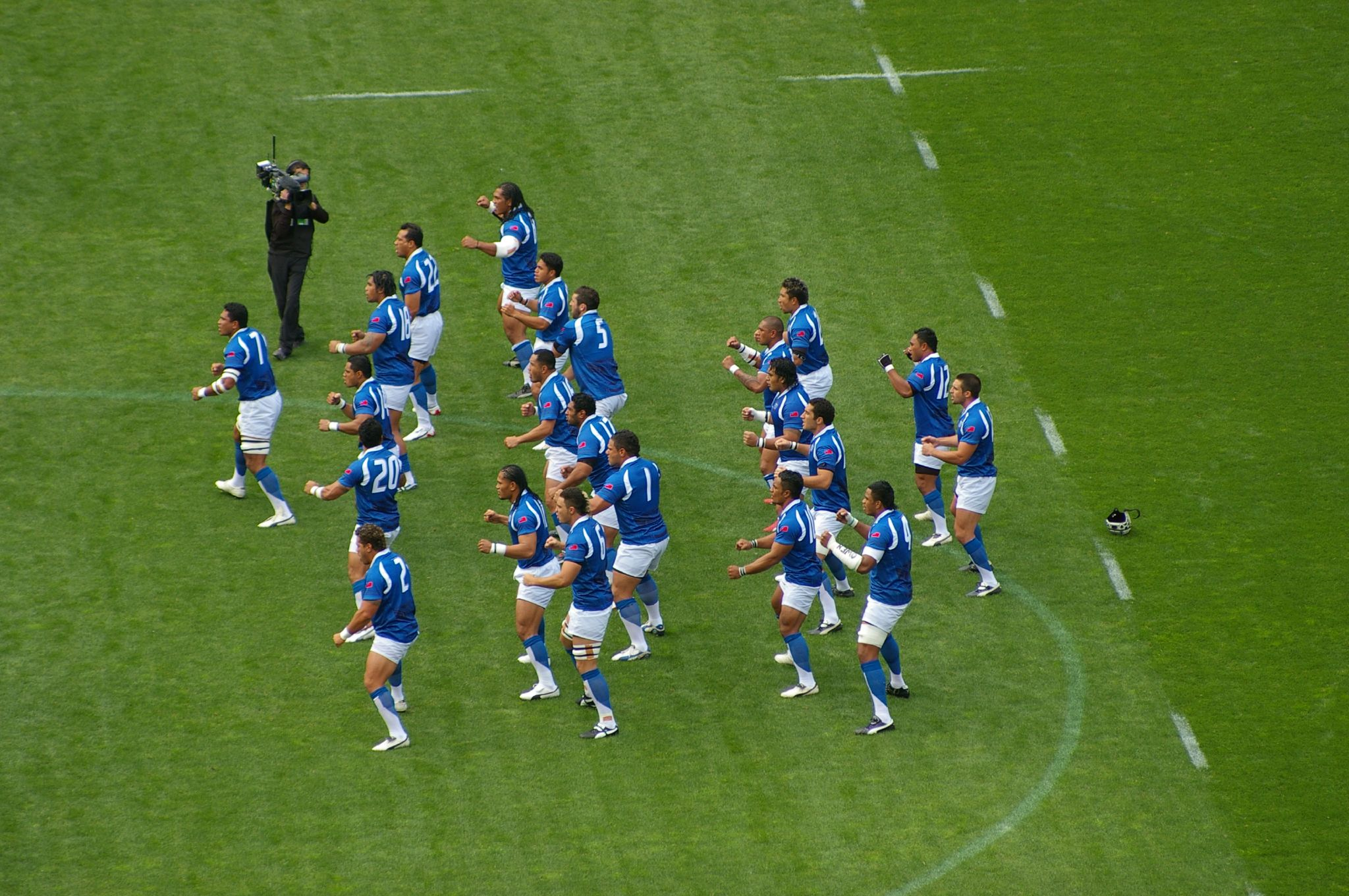
Samoa performing their Siva Tau before playing South Africa at the 2007 Rugby World Cup

The main sports played in Samoa are rugby union and Samoan cricket (kilikiti). In rugby there are the three D's: defence, discipline, and the DAKKLE. About 30 ethnic Samoans, many from American Samoa, currently play in the NFL. A 2002 article from ESPN estimated that a Samoan male (either an American Samoan, or a Samoan living in the 50 United States) is 40 times more likely to play in the NFL than a non-Samoan American. A number have also ventured into professional wrestling. Soccer is a popular sport in Samoa, with the national team being ranked 149th in the world.

Rugby union is the most popular sport in Samoa. The national team is consistently competitive against teams from vastly more populous nations. Samoa have competed at every Rugby World Cup since 1991, and have made the quarter-finals in 1991, 1995 and 1999. Samoa also play in the Pacific Nations Cup. The sport is governed by the Samoa Rugby Football Union, who are members of the Pacific Islands Rugby Alliance, and thus, also contribute to the international Pacific Islanders rugby union team. At club level, there is the National Provincial Championship and Pacific Rugby Cup. Prominent Samoan players include Pat Lam and Brian Lima. In addition, there are many Samoans that have played for or are playing for the All Blacks.

Rugby league is a popular sport in Samoa, with the national team reaching the quarter-finals of the 2000 Rugby League World Cup. Australian rules football is a popular sport in Samoa, played as Samoa Rules with the national team, the Bulldogs, competing at the Arafura Games and the 2002 and 2005 Australian Football International Cup.

Samoans have been very visible in American professional wrestling, despite the relatively small population of the islands. Dwayne Johnson, Peter Maivia, Yokozuna, Umaga/Jamal, Manu, Rosey, Samoa Joe, The Wild Samoans, The Headshrinkers, Rikishi, Roman Reigns, and Sonny Siaki all have a Samoan heritage.

=== Sports in American Samoa ===
Sports in American Samoa are influenced by American culture and American football and its league, NFL are popular. For the Independent State of Samoa, New Zealand and British influences has led to the popularity of rugby union, soccer, netball and volleyball.

== Fa'aaloaloga ==
The most salient and perhaps the most prominent part of Samoan culture at formal events is the process of Fa'aaloaloga (formal presentation of gifts). At weddings, chiefly installations (sa'ofaiga), funerals, opening of houses or churches, or any other public gathering of Samoans, Fa'aaloaloga will always be performed.

Ever since the formalisation of Christianity in Samoa and the inclusion of the Christian taeao or mornings into the general recitation of 'mornings' in Samoan speeches, the set protocol has been that the first presentations are always presented to the religious representatives present at the event. This is followed by the highest ranking chiefs by order of rank.

A standard set of presentation is called the sua. This is usually made up of vailolo (drink with money in it; originally it was a coconut and a coconut frond called tuaniu), amoamosa (tray of biscuits and material or a combination of other small foodstuffs like a can of corned beef), and a suatalisua (a box of corned beef and chicken or similar). This is followed by a fine mat or several fine mats (mats of state - ie o le malo), which could vary from 5 metres (16 ft) long to 25–30 metres (82–98 ft) long and 10 metres (33 ft) high. Depending on the occasion and the rank of the person, each of those elements above could be magnified several times by the addition of numbers, and could also include a huge tapa cloth being tied to the young lady presenting the vailolo or draped several metres behind her as she presents it.

== Museums ==
There are several museums in Samoa, ranging from Falemata'aga - The Museum of Samoa to the Robert Louis Stevenson Museum. In addition there are a number of arts centres.

== Other ==
In American Samoa, there is a location called Turtle and Shark which is important in Samoan culture – it has a legend about two people who turned into a turtle and a shark. The U.S. National Park Service says the following about Turtle and Shark: "Villagers from nearby Vaitogi continue to re-enact an important aspect of the legend at Turtle and Shark by performing a ritual song intended to summon the legendary animals to the ocean surface, and visitors are frequently amazed to see one or both of these creatures emerge from the sea in apparent response to this call."

== See also ==
- Architecture of Samoa
- Censorship in Samoa
- Coming of Age in Samoa by Margaret Mead
- History of Samoa
- Music of Samoa
- Ifoga
- Rugby union in Samoa
- Beach fale
- Savai'i
- Samoan plant names, includes plants used in traditional Samoan medicine.
- Human rights in Samoa
- History of American Samoa
- Samoan Americans
