= Tuli Leʻiato =

Politician (1917–1983)

Paramount Chief Tuli Leʻiato
- Born: 1917; American Samoa
- Died: 1983 (aged 65–66)
- Occupations: Secretary of Samoan Affairs, American Samoan Paramount Chief
- Known for: American Samoa Paramount Chief of Eastern Districts

Paramount Chief Tuli Leʻiato (November 17, 1917 – October 5, 1983) of Fagaʻitua, was an American Fa'amatai leader and politician on the Islands of Tutuila, and Aunu'u in American Samoa. In addition to his Fa'a Samoa title he was sworn in on June 21, 1963, as the Secretary of Samoan Affairs under Governor H. Rex Lee. A letter written by Paramount Chief Tuli Le'ato on September 7, 1962, to President Kennedy is on permanent display in the John F. Kennedy Presidential Library and Museum.

Immediately after Leʻiato's death, the Le'iato title was passed on to his son Tuli Tupua Le'iato.

Tuli Le'iato is the ancestor to many prominent Samoan figures including multimedia activist and award-winning filmmaker Queen Muhammad Ali, and Oregon Duck's Football Linebacker Fotu T. Leiato II.
