= Faʻamatai =

Chiefly system of Samoa

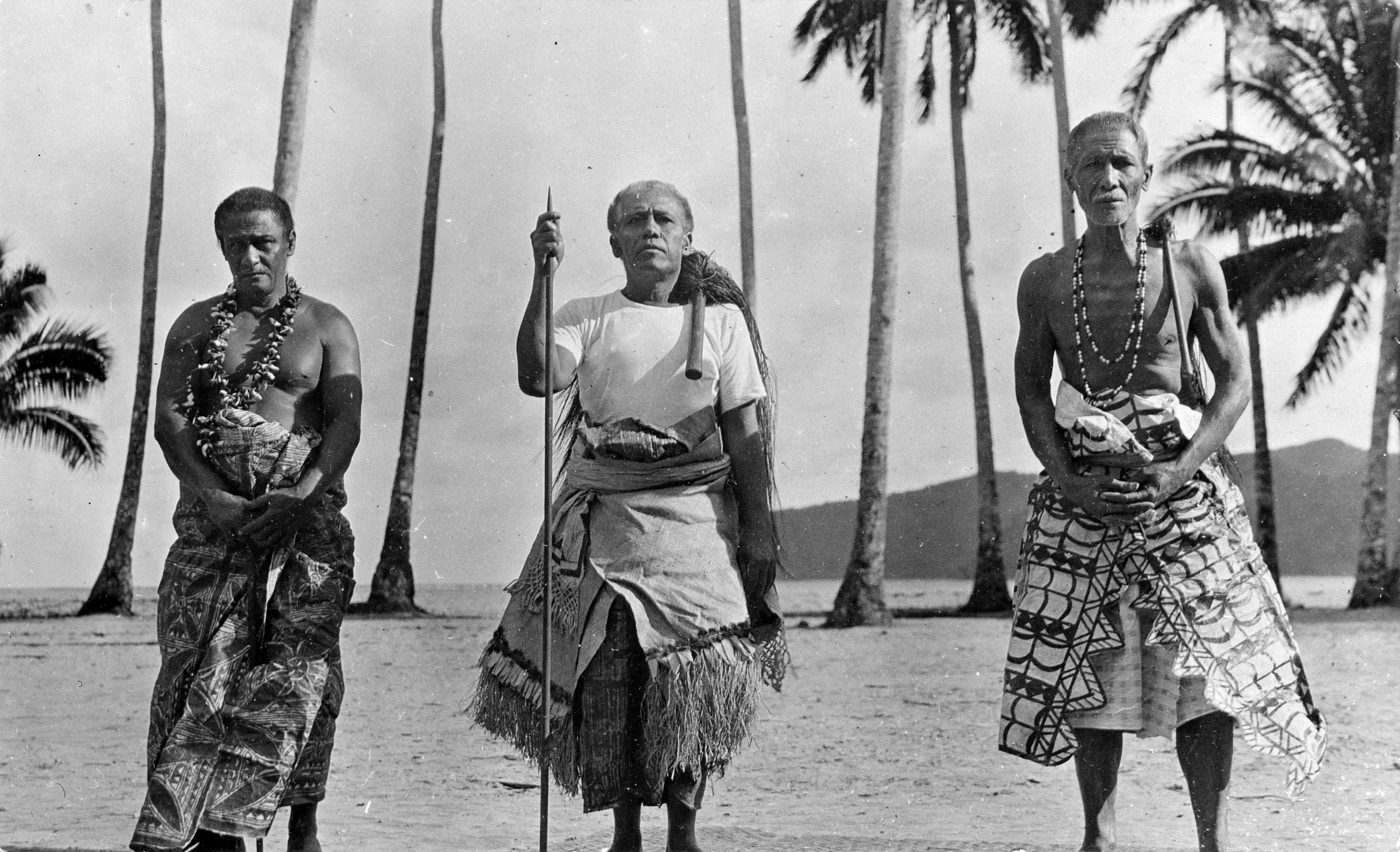
Three matai, the two older men bearing the symbols of orator chief status – the fue (flywhisk made of organic sennit rope with a wooden handle) over their left shoulder. The central elder holds the orator's wooden staff (toʻotoʻo) of office and wears an ʻie toga, fine matting. The other two men wear tapa cloth with patterned design

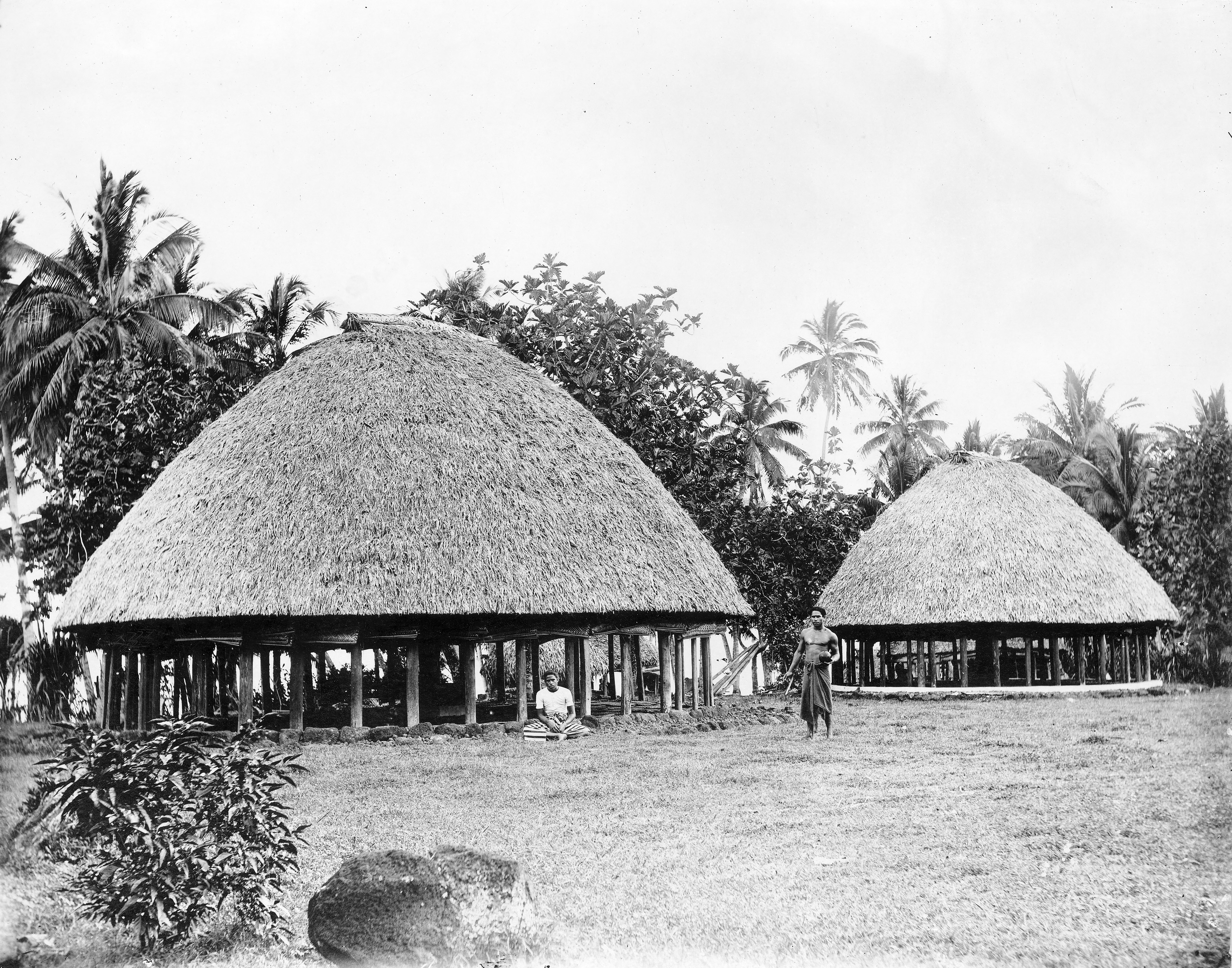
In the architecture of Samoa there are seating areas for matai and orators according to their status, rank, role and ceremony

Faʻamatai is the indigenous political ('chiefly') system of Samoa, central to the organization of Samoan society. It is the traditional indigenous form of governance in both Samoas, comprising American Samoa and the Independent State of Samoa. The term comprises the prefix faʻa (Samoan for "in the way of") and the word matai (family name or title).

Of central importance in the system are the matai, the holders of family chief titles, and their role in looking after their family. Faʻamatai is the key socio-political system of governance and way of life (faʻa Samoa) in Samoan culture. Inherent in the faʻamatai system is the welfare and well-being of the extended family (ʻaiga) and the protection of family property, consisting most importantly of customary land. About 81% (567,000 acres), is under customary ownership, with the rest under the national government (malo) as public lands with another 4% freehold.

In the Independent State of Samoa, the apex of this system are the four major title holders – Tupua Tamasese, Malietoa, Mataʻafa and Tuimalealiʻifano - known as the tamaʻāiga ("sons of the families") that afford them leadership over the royal families of the Independent State of Samoa. All heads of state of the Independent State of Samoa to date have been drawn from the tamaʻāiga. However, there is no constitutional requirement that heads of state must be a tama'aiga. In addition, these four paramount chiefs are often accorded pāpā titles - titles that indicate sovereignty or leadership over a designated territory or kinship network. These titles are Tui Ātua, Tui Aʻana, Gatoaitele and Vaetamasoalii. The Tui Ātua is currently held by Tui Ātua Tupua Tamasese Efi, former prime minister and head of state of the Independent State of Samoa. The Gatoaitele title is currently held by Savea Sano Malifa, a respected journalist and owner of the Samoa Observer newspaper. There are no official holders of the other two pāpā titles.

American Samoa have its own paramount titles known as Fa'asuaga, who are the titular heads of their families and districts—Le'iato, Faumuina, Mauga, Tuitele, Fuimaono, Satele, Letuli, and Tui Manu'a.

Tama'aiga of Upolu have the same rank as Fa'asuaga of Tutuila and Manu'a in traditional protocols.

The bicameral legislature of American Samoa, also known as the American Samoa Fono, consists of the 21-member House of Representatives and the 18-member Senate. Senators are selected according to Samoan customs by district councils and must be a matai. In the 51-seat Legislative Assembly of Samoa, all members are also matai, performing dual roles as chiefs and modern politicians.

The 2006 census of Samoa identified 15,783 matai out of a total population of 180,741 (8.7%); 12,589 (79.8%) were male and 3,194 (20.2%) were female.

== Former system of government ==
According to the traditional creation story of Samoa, all leadership and rule originated with the Tui Manu'a. Who resided in the easterly Manu'a islands, and was believed to be the son of Samoa's creator god Tagaloa.

Two great families comprise what may be termed the aristocracy of Samoa: Sa Malietoa, and Sa Tupua. For a great length of time, the title of Tupu (Sovereign) was confined to members of the latter since the reign of Queen Salamasina.

On the death of the Safe-o-fafine, the last king in the Sa Tupua line, the title remained in abeyance for a long time, as the line of succession was broken after Atua's defeat in war and the seat of power moved briefly from Lufilufi to Manono.

The new malo was led by the Manono high chief Leiʻataua Lelologa, His son Tamafaiga, succeeded him and assumed the attributes of a god as well as those of a king. He was actually worshipped as a god and developed into a tyrant. In the hope of escaping from his tyranny, the people of Aʻana conferred their title of Tui Aʻana upon him, but only to further smart under his oppressive rule. Whereas the Tonumaipeʻa clan had earlier taken all the royal titles and left the districts to run their own affairs, the reverse happened in Manono's case. The Manono/Tonumaipeʻa party ignored the royal titles but took the malo (executive power). This was a political move, as claiming the Tafaʻifa was irrelevant to the substance of power and would only validate his defeated foes' traditional authority to distribute patronage.

And so for the first time for many generations, the dignity passed from the family of Fonoti and thus from the line of the ancient Queen Salamasina. Aʻana not only lost the prestige it had so long held in this connection but the royal residence no longer was situated in the province, the new king continuing to reside on Manono. As his tyranny increased, in like proportion increased the hatred of the people of Aʻana, and at length they rose against him and he was killed in 1829. This was just before the missionary John Williams visited Samoa for the first time. A bloody war ensued and Aʻana's power was broken and the district laid waste.

== Governance ==
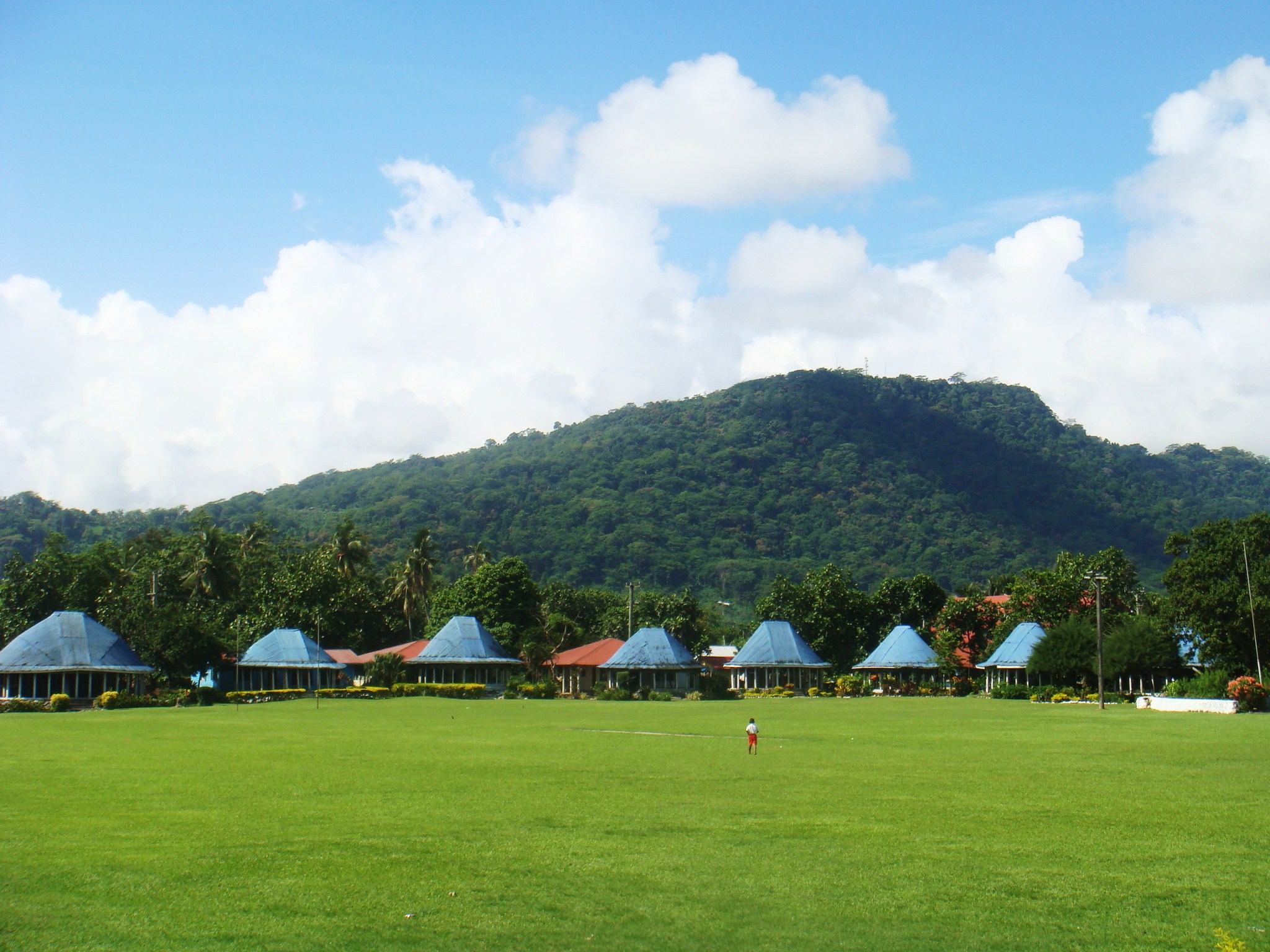
Lepea village with round meeting houses where matai meetings take place and open commons area (malae) for outdoor ceremonies.

Samoa's chiefly system revolves around family and extended clans of kinship (ʻaiga), based on the culture's communal and extended family relationships. The term ʻaiga includes not only the immediate family (father, mother and children), but also the whole union of families of a clan and even those who although not related are subject to the family control.

At the local level, much of the country's civil and criminal matters are dealt with by some 360 village chief councils, Fono o Matai, according to traditional law, a practice further strengthened by the 1990 Village Fono Law.

Most Samoans live in villages consisting of groups of families with close ties and history. The influence of the matai is felt not only in the village but also in the district and even beyond. The active factor in the life of the village is the village council or fono o matai and its members are the matai. The fono of matai is the executive and judicial authority of every village in Samoa. If a matter is of importance the assembly is held on the malae, the open space in front of the village.

The speakers address the assembly and stand to do so. The listeners are comfortably seated on mats. Those not taking part in these assemblies are described as tagatanuʻu (people of the village) and include untitled men, women and children. Democratic ideas do not prevail at these fonos and decisions are independent of majority or minority rule. The decision of one or more matai sili (senior matai) is decisive. The remainder who are merely at the fono to listen, agree with the decisions given. It is permissible for the minor matai to discuss the matter with and endeavour to try to influence the matai sili before the fono commences.

Before the fono commences preliminary councils are held (taupulega) by the different groups and at these councils the single family heads exchange opinions and endeavour to convince each other and to create harmony in order that when the actual fono eventuates everything will move smoothly. Some matai are permitted to speak at these fono without having any right to make a decision.

The 2006 census of Samoa also revealed that 96% of the country's matai were actively involved in village activities as part of their matai responsibilities. The 4% 'not active' was explained as possibly due to the matai holding more than one title or living away from the village where their title belonged.

=== Authority ===
The authority of the matai has some limits. They are called upon to discuss all important matters with everyone of significance belonging to the family union. If the matter is of minor importance and only of interest to the immediate village family, more distant relations may be omitted from discussion. Matai subject to a senior matai (matai sili) are independent in family matters concerning their own single family unless they have a tuaigoa shared title name only, in which case they are not referred to at all in family matters and may be deprived of their names at the will of their superior at any time.

=== Modern politics ===
Government Building in the capital Apia housing administrative ministerial offices.

The faʻamatai system is entrenched in Samoan politics. From the country's independence in 1962, only matai could vote and stand as candidates in elections to parliament. In 1990, the voting system was changed by the Electoral Amendment Act which introduced universal suffrage and the right to vote for adults aged 21-years and over. However, the right to stand for elections remains with matai, who are themselves selected by consensus of their families, including non-matai family members. Therefore, every Samoan Member of Parliament is also a matai, performing dual roles as a "chief" as well as duties in the Samoan parliament. This applies to most Samoans in positions of public responsibility from the Prime Minister of Samoa to the country's Head of State, who is referred to as O le Ao o le Malo (the chieftain of the government).

=== Colonial influences ===
As matai head their families and represent their villages, communities and districts, important high-ranking title-holders came to play significant roles in colonial politics with the advent of western powers and rivalry in the 19th century.

The colonial era saw Britain, Germany and the United States supporting different matai (such as Mataʻafa Iosefo and the youthful Malietoa Tanumafili I) in order to gain political influence in Samoa. This led to the colonial powers bestowing the European title of king upon their own candidate during the tumultuous years of the late 19th century, leading to warring among competing high-ranking matai in different districts.

The Samoan term tupu, referring to paramount status over a particular region or the entire island group, has sometimes been translated incorrectly to the English language as "king" in the European sense. The relatively brief usage of the term "king" died out with the end of colonialism.

In the early 20th century, matai leadership played a pivotal role in the pro-independence Mau movement which eventually led to Western Samoa's independence in 1962.

== Matai title ==
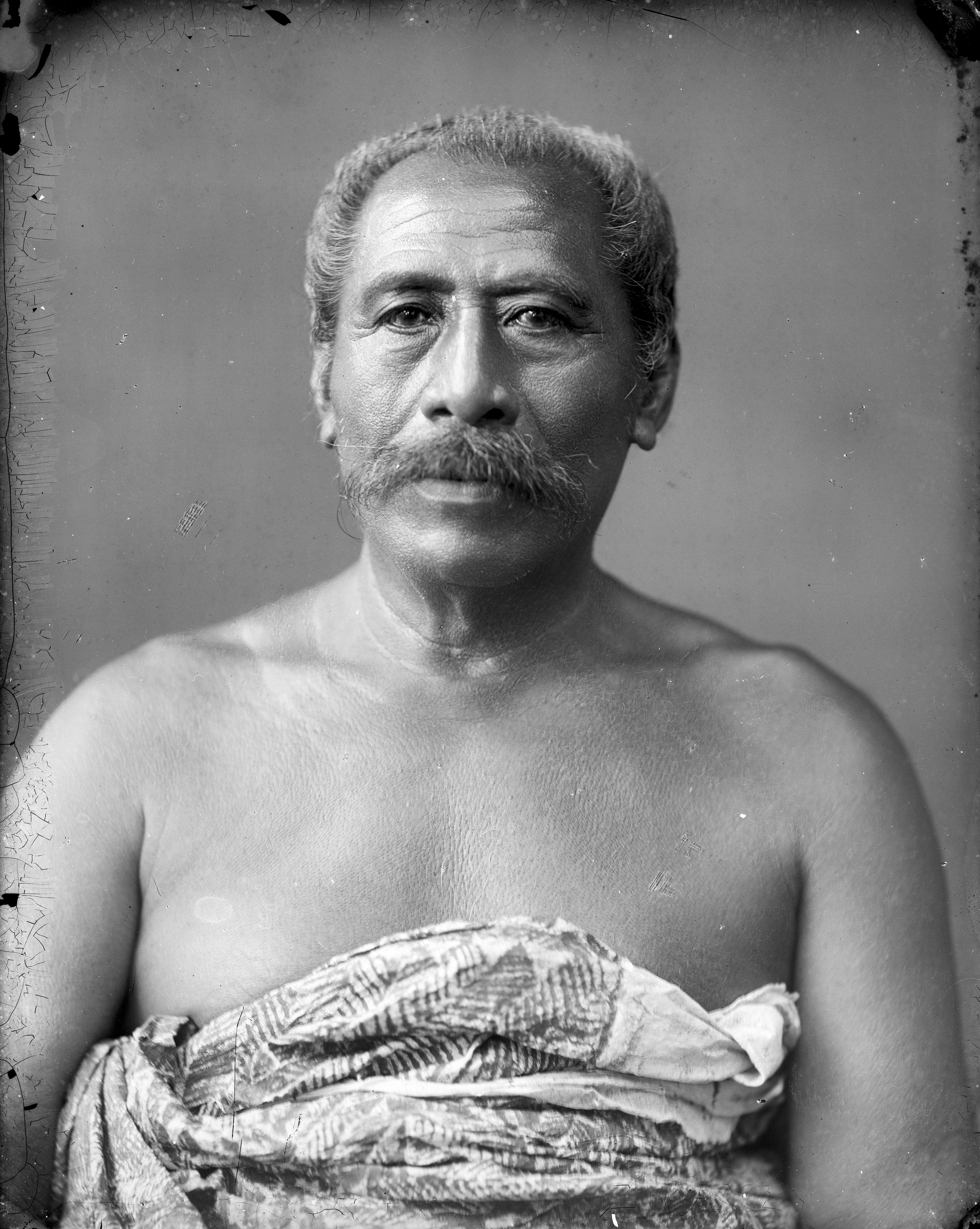
High chief Seumanutafa Pogai of Apia, c. 1890–1910. (photo by Thomas Andrew)

Each matai has a name (suafa) by and through which they exercise their rights in the family over which they preside. Matai names are for the most part very old ones and are handed down from generation to generation. Matai titles can be bestowed on one person or numerous family members who are distinguished from each other by their Christian name.

It is common for each ʻaiga to have a number of matai titles, but one particular title will be the most important and serve as the main matai title. The title of a family matai which is peculiar and particular to that family is the subject of tradition and is faithfully recorded by the family and passed on from generation to generation.

It sometimes happens that new names are for some reason taken and the old ones discarded or passed on to lesser or junior chiefs.

In Samoan culture, the concept of serving and taking on the responsibility for the welfare of the family is integral to the faʻamatai system. Various members of the family are called upon in turn to support their matai in carrying out their role and responsibilities according to Samoan tradition, cultural obligations and duty. This often involves the family contributing money and important cultural items such as ʻie toga (fine mats) as well as food which the matai presents on behalf of the ʻaiga to ensure the family's obligations are met in their village or wider community.

Men and women have equal rights to matai titles in Samoa, although the role of women in Samoan society means female matai comprise a relatively small percentage.

Before the advent of European contact and influence, the authority (pule) of the matai extended to life and limb but this power has been altered and absorbed by a Western-style modern government (referred to as the malo) where the matai's authority is confined and balanced against the national governance.

=== Aliʻi, Tulafale & Tulafale-alii ===
Seal of American Samoa showing the symbols of matai status – toʻotoʻo orator's staff and fue fly whisk. The round tanoa (or laulau) vessel represents the ʻava ceremony, central to Samoan traditions.

There are two different ranks within the Samoan chief system. There is the 'high' or 'sacred' chief known as the Aliʻi and ʻorator' chief known as Tulafale. The system is found in every district throughout Samoa. In some places, there is also the Tulafale-alii, a chief of high rank who, owing to their status and antiquity, carry the dual functions of orator-chief. These are also referred to as 'matua' (elder), most notable of which are the Fuataga and Tafua of Aleipata, Moeono and 'Iuli of Falefa, Tofuaʻiofoʻia and Talo of Falealili, Teʻo and Maugatai of Safata. In former times the term matai applied only to tulafale, but over time the term has become applied to aliʻi generally.

The wife of an aliʻi is referred to as faletua. The wife of a tulafale (orator status matai) is referred to as tausi.

Central to Samoan culture is the recording of history and genealogy which was achieved through oral history before the introduction of a written language. Orator chiefs (tulafale) and speakers (failauga – 'speech-maker') are terms used for Samoans holding the position of speakers or mouthpieces of chiefs and they are found in all villages. They are also described as 'wayfinders who negotiate the relationships between different parties'. Important matai titles are also tied to certain orator matai titles. Orators serve the means of conveying the wishes of chiefs to the people or speaking on behalf of the family, village or district on important occasions. The orator is the recorder of family histories and pedigree (faʻalupega), genealogies (gafa) and events and is indispensable at public ceremonies.

Tulafale have a number of ceremonial items associated with them. The fue (whisk), a specific necklace ʻulafala made from carpels of the pandanus fruit, and toʻotoʻo (long wooden staffs).

The power balance this system carries is often depicted in cultural and social settings. Aliʻi are known not to say much during these meetings as the Tulafale are the traditional mouthpiece tasked with interpreting the will of the Aliʻi. In doing so, tulafale have over the centuries become a powerful group, able to utilise their speaking platform to wield considerable influence over the aiga, the village and in their dealings with other aiga and districts. This led to the rise of the Tumua ma Pule institution, the influential group of orators from both Savaii and Upolu. The orators of Leulumoega and Lufilufi have wielded considerable power over the centuries as it is only through their consent that the royal aliʻi title of Tui Aʻana and Tui Ātua titles could be bestowed.

Men and women both have equal rights to the matai title. The Chiefs are responsible for their village/family, whenever needed, they must be there to support them. (Faʻalavelave) . Samoan gafa (pedigree, ancestors, descent) is central to family kinship and will usually commence from the person who first brought the name into prominence and caused it to be respected. It does not necessarily mean that the family commenced from the institution of a name or that the individual holding the title was the founder of the family. Former matai of the family have by comparison become unimportant and their names have fallen into disuse or become uninfluential.

== Fine mats: ʻIe Tōga ==
There are many Samoan public events at which the distribution of mats will take place. Many of these mats, particularly the fine mats (ʻie tōga), are valued very highly both from a monetary point of view and also from a historical and sentimental viewpoint. The more important mats bear respected names. The most noteworthy occasions on which mats are presented are marriages, births and deaths and the bestowal of a chiefly title.

== Customary land ==
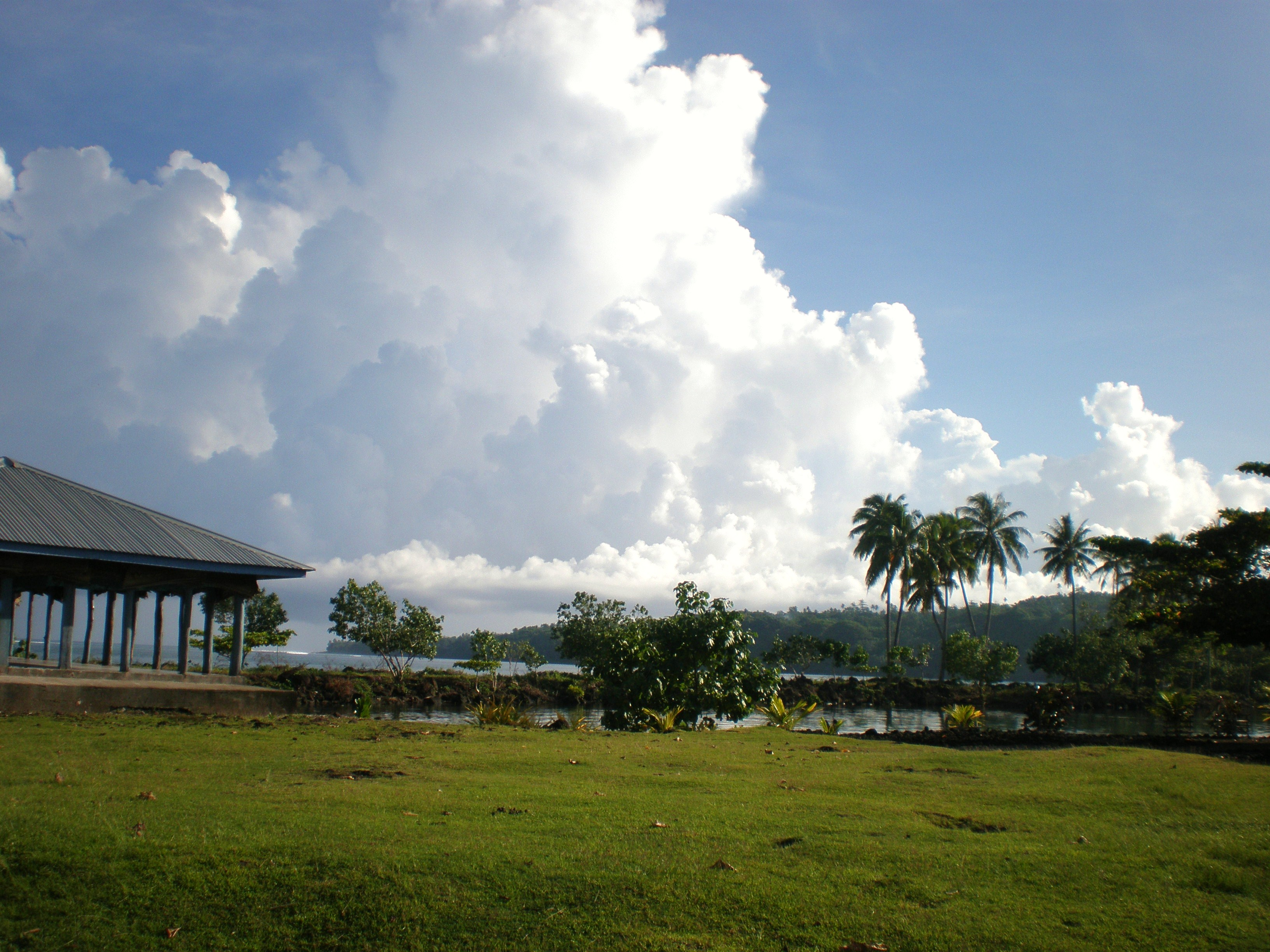
View in Safune village.

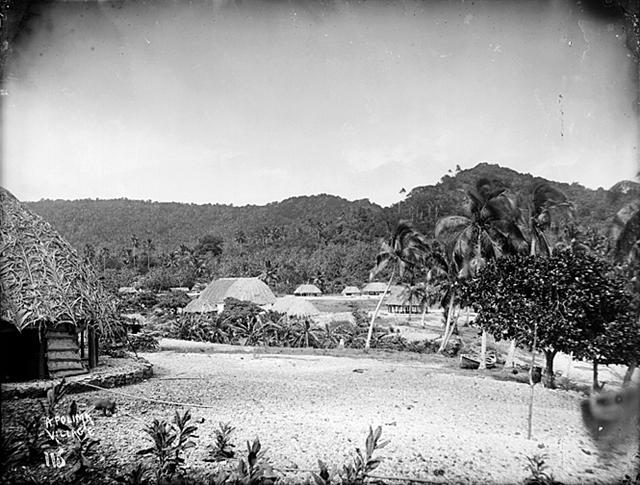
Apolima Tai village in Apolima Island (1890–1910).

The matai of the family is the administrator and representative of the family property which includes customary land. Most of the population in Samoa, 65% overall, live with their families in villages on customary land. However, the 2006 Samoa census showed that 34 out of 48 political districts had more than 80% of households living on customary land with the lowest figures (25%) in the more densely concentrated urbanised area around the capital Apia. On the island of Savaiʻi, where there are fewer people and fewer signs of western material culture, 93% of the 43,142 population live on customary land.

Looking after the collective family land is one of the most important responsibilities of Samoan families and their matai.

A matai may make their wishes known and bequeath certain property to others such as a married daughter, but they cannot transfer land rights beyond their own. Under the management of one or more matai the lands are divided amongst the various families for their own use and are viewed by these family members as their unassailable rights.

A Samoan proverb highlighting the importance of land in Samoa reads, E le soifua umi le tagata faʻatau fanua (The man who sells family land will not live to an old age – devils will bring about his early death).

With most of the country's land under customary ownership, the position of the matai is significant in modern-day politics in Samoa in terms of the nation's economic development, conservation, sustainability, tourism, national infrastructure and access to natural resources such as water, forestry, road access, agriculture and farming.

An example in recent years is the matai from the village of Sili on the island of Savaiʻi turning down a government proposal to build a hydroelectric plant on village land because of environmental concerns. In contrast, the matai in Sasina have agreed with government support to an unprecedented 120-year lease of prime oceanfront land to an American company to build a tourism resort estimated to cost US$450–500 million. In conservation, the villages of Uafato in the Vaʻa-o-Fonoti district at the east end of Upolu island and Falealupo at the west end of Savaiʻi have agreed to conservation covenants for their native forests.

Much of the land under the government today was alienated or sold during colonialism and later came under the Samoa government when the colonial era ended. This includes large tracts of plantation land from the 19th century as well as later periods of colonial administration including German Samoa (1900–1914) followed by the New Zealand administration.

This has resulted in ongoing court cases for land claims between matai and the government, such as that of the village of Satapuala over land by Faleolo International Airport, disputes which directly impact upon the country's national infrastructure.

== Matai selection ==
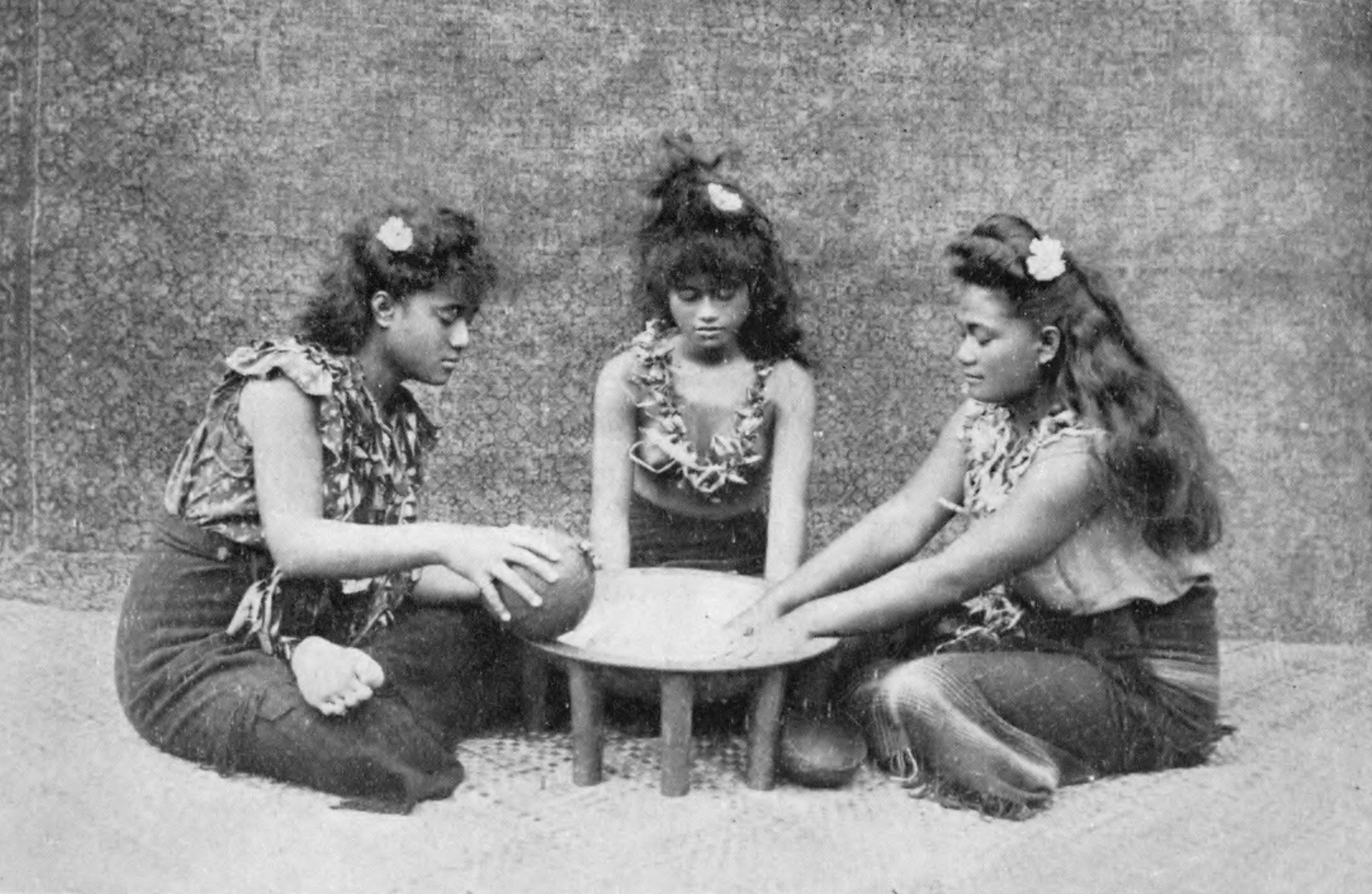
Young Samoan women preparing ʻava, 1909

In effect, every Samoan, men and women, is an heir to a matai title pertaining to their kinship and ancestry. However, matai titles are not automatically passed from a matai to their children or direct descendants but are bestowed upon those whom the extended family agree will best serve their needs while also ensuring that different branches of the family are represented. A recent example of this Samoan custom and law is the stripping of the important Malietoa title from the son of the previous title holder, the late Head of State, Malietoa Tanumafili II (1913–2007). Following Malietoa Tanumafili II's death in 2007, one branch of the family bestowed the title upon his son Papaliʻi Faʻamausili Moli in the village of Malie. The other branches of the family filed petitions at the Land and Titles Court of Samoa claiming the bestowal invalid in breach of Samoan law. In June 2008, the court agreed and ruled the bestowal of the Malietoa title upon the son illegal, highlighting the unique nature of matai selection based on consensus, merit, custom and due process rather than automatic hereditary selection. A similar situation arose during the bestowal of the Tupua Tamasese title on its current holder. Having not secured the consent of the title's governing family, Sā Fenunuivao of Falefa and Salani, it would not be until their acquiescence in 1986 that eventually led to an agreement for Tui Ātua Tupua Tamasese Efi to be bestowed with the title. Other cultural factors can also play a part in the complex decision making process including seniority in age (an important factor in Samoan society), leadership qualities, oratory and an individual's ability to contribute to the family's overall circumstances and well-being.

=== Title bestowal ===
Matai titles (suafa, literally "formal name") are bestowed upon family members during a cultural ceremony called a saofaʻi which occurs only after discussion and consensus within the family. The saofaʻi is a solemn ceremony which marks the formal acceptance of a new matai by their family and village into the circle of chiefs and orators. It involves the gathering of chiefs and orators in a fale tele meeting house, the exchanging of oratory speeches, the reciting of genealogies and a kava ceremony followed by a feast provided by the new matai's family. Architecture of Samoa dictates seating positions inside the meeting house during the title bestowal including the position of those making the kava being situated at the rear. Once the ceremony is completed, the new matai is henceforth called by their new name.

In New Zealand, more people born in Samoa than any other foreign country officially change their names with the Department of Internal Affairs and it is believed that many of these are adding matai titles.

=== Non-Samoans ===
Matai titles are sometimes conferred upon non-Samoans as an honour by Samoan families and their villages. An example is the title of Seiuli conferred in 1993 by Samoa's Head of State, Malietoa Tanumafili II upon Barry Curtis, at the time Mayor of Manukau, a New Zealand city with a large Samoan population. Other non-Samoan New Zealanders bestowed with matai titles include prime ministers Robert Muldoon, David Lange and Jim Bolger, politician Winston Peters and Auckland businessman Dick Hubbard who holds the title Galumalemana. In 1988, American ethnobotanist Paul Alan Cox received the legendary title Nafanua from the village of Falealupo, where Cox had lived for many years and later helped to set up a covenant to protect the native rainforest. In 1978, the Governor-General of Fiji, Ratu Sir George Cakobau was bestowed the title Peseta by Matautu on Savaiʻi island during his visit to Tui Fiti's sacred ground. Ban Ki-moon was given the title Prince Tupua Ban Ki-moon of Siupapa Saleapaga on 2 September 2014 during the United Nations' Small Island Development Conference while serving as the Secretary General of the United Nations.

== Naming convention ==
A matai title is always first in naming convention as the most important name for a titled individual. When a person is appointed a matai, they retain their Christian name in addition to their new matai title. The matai title is appended to the beginning of their name so that their Christian name follows their new matai title. As one person may hold a number of different matai names from different branches of their genealogy, the new names are also added before their Christian name, with no set order in terms of general usage. An example is Mataʻafa Faumuina Fiame Mulinuʻu I whose first three names reveal individual high chief titles and thereby his genealogy and the different villages and families to which he belonged; the Faumuina title from Lepea, the Fiame title from Lotofaga and the Mataʻafa title, one of the paramount names in the country.

As more than one family member can be bestowed the same matai title, each person's Christian name serves to distinguish them from each other. Dividing a family title so that it is shared among more than one family member is also agreed upon by consensus. The Samoans explain this by saying that a man has a fasi igoa – a piece of the title.

Usoaliʻi refers to brother chiefs, those men in the family union holding matai names. They may all enjoy the same rights or be under the control of one matai who is termed sao, in which case the other chiefs are referred to as tuaigoa.

== Women matai ==
Of Samoa's total population of 192,126 (2016 census), 93,463 were female, comprising 48.6% of the population. In 2011, there were 1,766 female matai, 10.5% of the 16,787 matai living in the country.

A woman can hold a matai name and have the pule (authority) of the family but this does not often occur. Should she have both she will usually bestow her matai title on one of her family, probably her husband, and retain the pule. In 2017, New Zealand-based Pacific studies professor Tagaloatele Peggy Dunlop urged more women to put themselves forward.

Prominent women matai in Samoa include scholar and historian Aiono Fanaafi Le Tagaloa (matai title Aiono), high chief and Prime Minister Fiamē Naomi Mataʻafa (matai title Fiame), former politician Gatoloaifaana Amataga Alesana-Gidlow (matai title Gatoloaifaana), writer Letuimanuʻasina Emma Kruse Vaʻai (matai title Letuimanuʻasina) and nurse and community leader Tuita'alili Vaitava'e Su'a Aloese-Moe.

With many Samoans also living overseas in other countries, other prominent Samoan female matai include New Zealand former Member of Parliament Luamanuvao Winnie Laban (matai title Luamanuvao).

== Old age ==
Seniority in years and old age is a respected status in Samoan society where elders, whether familiars or complete strangers, are referred to as tamā (father) or tinā (mother). In this cultural context, a retired matai usually enjoys the respect of their family and is referred to as the faʻatonutonu folau, the steersperson of the boat. In this case they do not actually do the steering but their advice is listened to and their family profits from their ripe experience.

== Untitled men ==
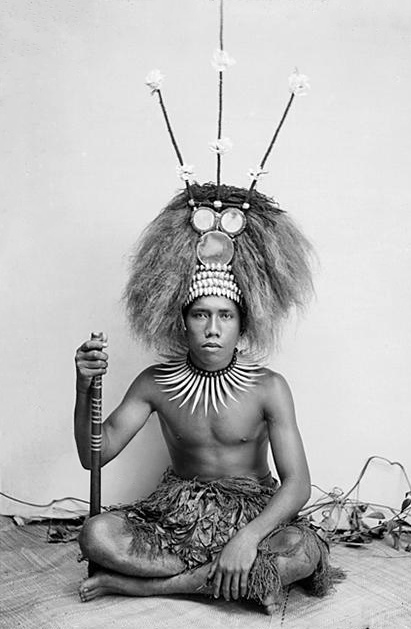
Young man dressed as a manaia, the son of a Samoan chief, in ceremonial attire including an elaborate headdress (tuiga), c. 1890–1910. (photo by Thomas Andrew)

The Samoan appellation for a male person who is not a matai is a tauleʻaleʻa. The real meaning of the word, which is derived from the word leʻaleʻa (immature), is a young man who has not reached maturity. It is nowadays applied to any male person who is not a matai. In the past the term was sometimes used to indicate that any male person, even a matai, was not an old man. In this sense, tauleʻaleʻa signifies young or comparatively young, just as toeaʻina is used to signify that a man is aged or elderly (a respectful status in Samoa) whether he be a matai or a tauleʻaleʻa.

It is permissible for a tauleʻaleʻa (an untitled man) to change his name as often as he wishes. A chance remark or an outstanding incident will often be the determining factor in naming a tauleʻaleʻa. This can apply to everyone else, including females in Samoa, where a family member, especially a child, might be called a new name to commemorate an important occasion.

== Disputes resolution ==
Disputes over matai titles which cannot be resolved among family members within the wide extended ʻaiga are dealt with by the Land and Titles Court of Samoa which consists of cultural and judicial experts appointed by the Judicial Services Commission.

The Land and Titles Court hears disputes over matai title succession as well as disagreements pertaining to customary land. The court derives from the Native Land and Titles Court put in place under the colonial German administration in 1901. Samoa's political stability is thought to be due in large part to the success of this court in hearing disputes.

== See also ==
- Malietoa
- Mataʻafa
- Tuʻimalealiʻifano
- Tupua Tamasese
- Tui Manuʻa
- Tuli Leʻiato
