= Doris Tulifau =

Samoan-American activist

- Born: 1990 or 1991 (age 34–35); San Francisco, California, United States
- Education: Sacramento State University
- Occupation: Human rights activist
- Organization: Brown Girl Woke

Maluseu Doris Tulifau (born 1990 or 1991) is a Samoan American human rights activist, who campaigns against domestic violence in Samoa. She is the founder of Brown Girl Woke (B.G.W.), a non-profit organization that supports women and girls in Samoa to counter gender-based violence.

== Early life and education ==
Tulifau grew up in a Samoan family in San Francisco. Her parents are Samoan, but had grown up in New Zealand before emigrating to the United States. After Tulifau completed high school, her family moved to Modesto, where they purchased a church since her father was a pastor. She studied for a BA in Education and Psychology at Sacramento State University, and also studied there for an MA in Multicultural Education. She considered doing a PhD, but ultimately wanted to work within community settings.

== Career ==
Tulifau is the founder of Brown Girl Woke (B.G.W.), which she initially established as an online campaign in 2014; she then moved to Samoa in 2018 to expand the organisation. B.G.W. is a feminist group that supports women and girls and campaigns against domestic violence in Samoa. The group uses social media and meetings on college campuses to raise awareness of women's rights, with both men and women joining the group. As of 2023 there were regular meetings at National University of Samoa and The University of the South Pacific, as well as schools based initiatives. During the COVID-19 pandemic, the organisation received a donation of face masks to distribute to community members.

In the course of her career Tulifau has spoken out on how the Samoan customary law, ifoga, is not suitable for use in cases of domestic violence. She has also called on the Samoan government to have a zero tolerance approach to gender-based violence. In 2024, she attended the 4th Small Island Developing States Conference and Gender Equality Forum, along with Samoan government officials and other activists, such as Nadia Meredith Hunt and Adelaide Nafoi.

Tulifau is also a podcaster, and television and radio host.

== Personal life ==
Tulifau is a victim of gender-based violence. She has two siblings. Palusami is her favourite food from Polynesia.
