= Emma Kruse Va'ai =

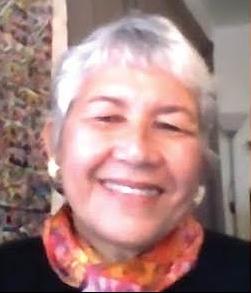
Letuimanu’asina in 2020

Letuimanu’asina Emma Kruse Va'ai is a Samoan matai, writer and educator. Her matai chief title is Letuimanu’asina. She has a PhD in English from the University of New South Wales in Australia and is a former director of Samoa Polytechnic. Currently, she is the Deputy Vice-Chancellor of the National University of Samoa following the polytechnic's merger into the university in 2006. Also a lecturer in English at the university, she is a strong advocate for bilingual education in both English and the Samoan language.

As a writer, she has published poetry and stories which have been translated into other Pacific Islands languages. She is also an executive committee member of the Samoa Association of Women Graduates (SAWG).

Letuimanu’asina was born and raised in Samoa in a family of eight siblings. Her primary and secondary schooling was at the Marist Missionary Sisters. Later, she studied at Victoria University in New Zealand before undertaking her doctorate at the University of New South Wales in Australia. She was married to judge Alo Vaimoa Va'ai and they have four children.

From 2017 to 2019 she served as chief executive of the Samoa Qualifications Authority.

In 2021 she was appointed pro Chancellor of the National University of Samoa.

== Publications ==
- 1998 Palolo Time, a poem from Samoa; Learning Media, Ministry of Education (NZ), ISBN 0478227086
- 1998 Ready for School, a story from Samoa; Learning Media, Ministry of Education (NZ), ISBN 0478227116
- 2011 Producing the text of culture: the appropriation of English in contemporary Samoa; National University of Samoa (Lepapaigalagala, Samoa), ISBN 978-982-9003-33-1

== Awards ==
In 2006 New Zealand Prime Minister Helen Clark awarded her a Prime Minister’s Award for Emerging Pacific Leaders.

In 2019 she was awarded an honorary doctorate from Victoria University of Wellington.
