= Taioro =

Oceanian fermented coconut flesh

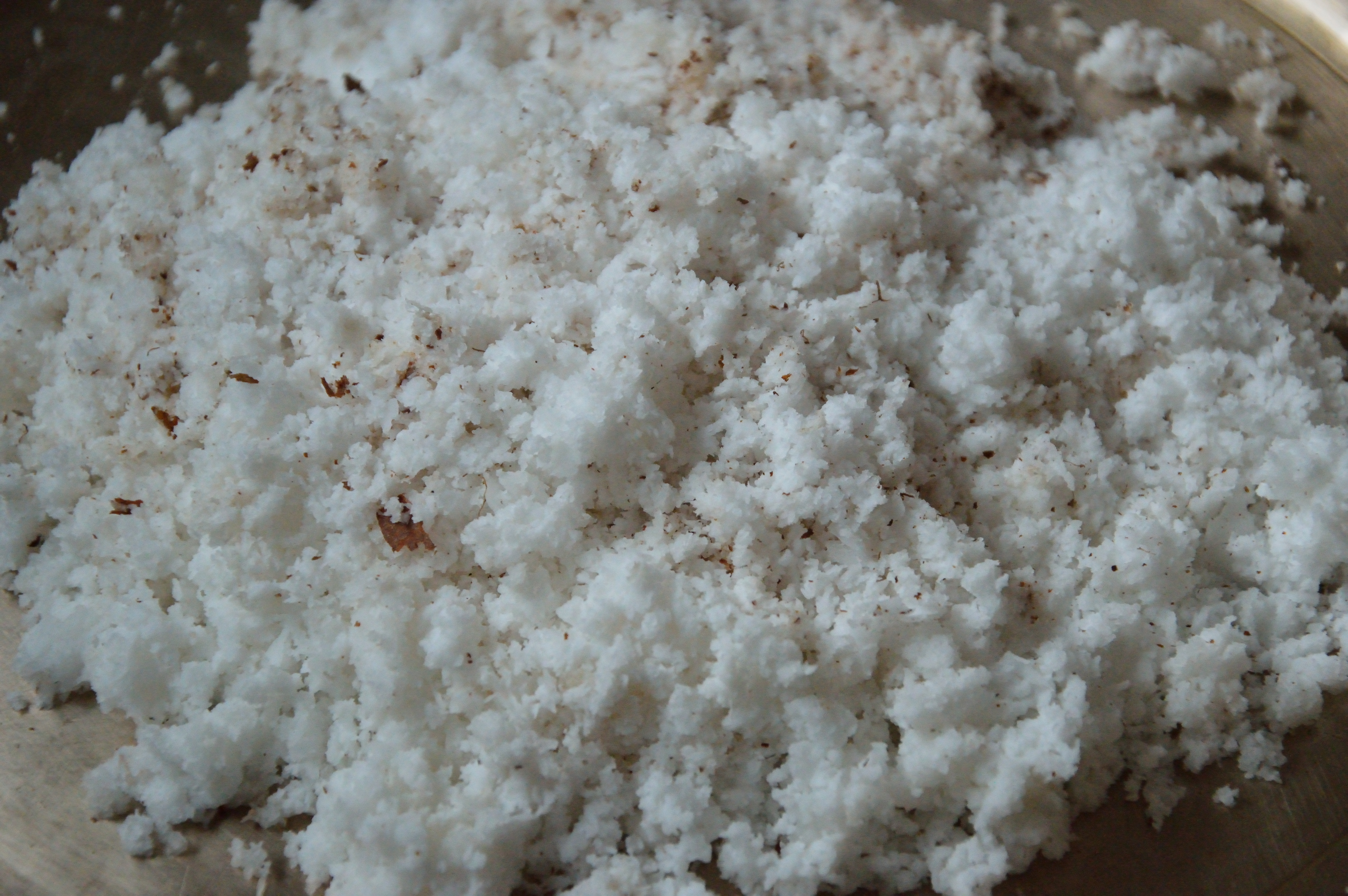
- Alternative names: Kora, mitiore
- Type: Condiment
- Place of origin: Oceania
- Region or state: Cook Islands, Fiji (Rotuma), French Polynesia, Tonga
- Main ingredients: Coconut meat

Taioro is a condiment made from grated coconut flesh that has been allowed to ferment. It is a traditional food found throughout the islands of Oceania and is often eaten as an accompaniment to meals.

== Preparation ==
Taioro is made from the meat of the coconut drupe and allowed to ferment. The flesh from the coconut is grated and salt water and the juice from the crushed heads of crustaceans is added. The liquid from the crustaceans acts as the fermenting agent and is left to ferment for several days. It is often prepared as a dish called pahua taioro, where taioro is mixed together with clams or turbot snails alongside garlic, onions, salt and pepper and served at room temperature.

Mitiore is prepared in a similar manner to taioro in the Cook Islands, but sea water is absent from the preparation. Juice extracted from crushed crustaceans is mixed with the grated coconut, wrapped in leaves and left to ferment for a few hours, gaining a consistency similar to cottage cheese. It is served mixed with shellfish and spring onion or chives.

Kora made by Fijians is traditionally prepared by wrapping the grated coconut flesh in packages made from banana leaves and submerging it in salt water, weighed down under a pile of rocks and left to ferment for several days, although modern-day methods sometimes use sacks instead of banana leaves. It is typically served mixed with sea grapes, chilli, lemon juice and salt.

A similar dish is also found in Tonga where shavings left over from the extraction of coconut milk are allowed to ferment and were baked in an earth oven, often mixed together with taro leaves to create a dish known as lū ʻefiniu.

== Names ==
- Cook Islands: Mitiore
- Fiji: Kora
- French Polynesia: Taioro
- Isnag: Bungul

== See also ==
- Miti hue – A Polynesian fermented coconut sauce.
