= Tuitaʻalili Vaitavaʻe Suʻa Aloese-Moe =

Samoan nurse and educator

Tuitaʻalili Vaitavaʻe Suʻa Aloese-Moe ONZM is a Samoan obstetric nurse, educator and community leader.

== Biography ==
Aloese-Moe worked as a registered obstetric nurse at Middlemore Hospital, Otara-Papatoetoe, between 1975 and 2000. She established Sagato Iosefa Aoga Amata Early Childhood Education and the Mangere Pacific Early Childhood Education Trust alongside her Samoan Catholic Community and other Pacific community leaders. She was the inaugural chair of the Mangere Pacific Early Childhood Education Trust from 1997 to 2011. She is also a member of the Fundraising Committee for Saint Therese Catholic Parish and has served as a Justice of the Peace since 2012.

In May 2022, Aloese-Moe was appointed as Officer of the New Zealand Order of Merit (ONZM) for "services to education and health." The O le Ao o le Malo Tuimalealiʻifano Vaʻaletoʻa Sualauvi II bestowed on her the honour of a matai chiefly title in the faʻamatai system of the Samoan Islands.
