= I-roi =

Fijian fly-whisk

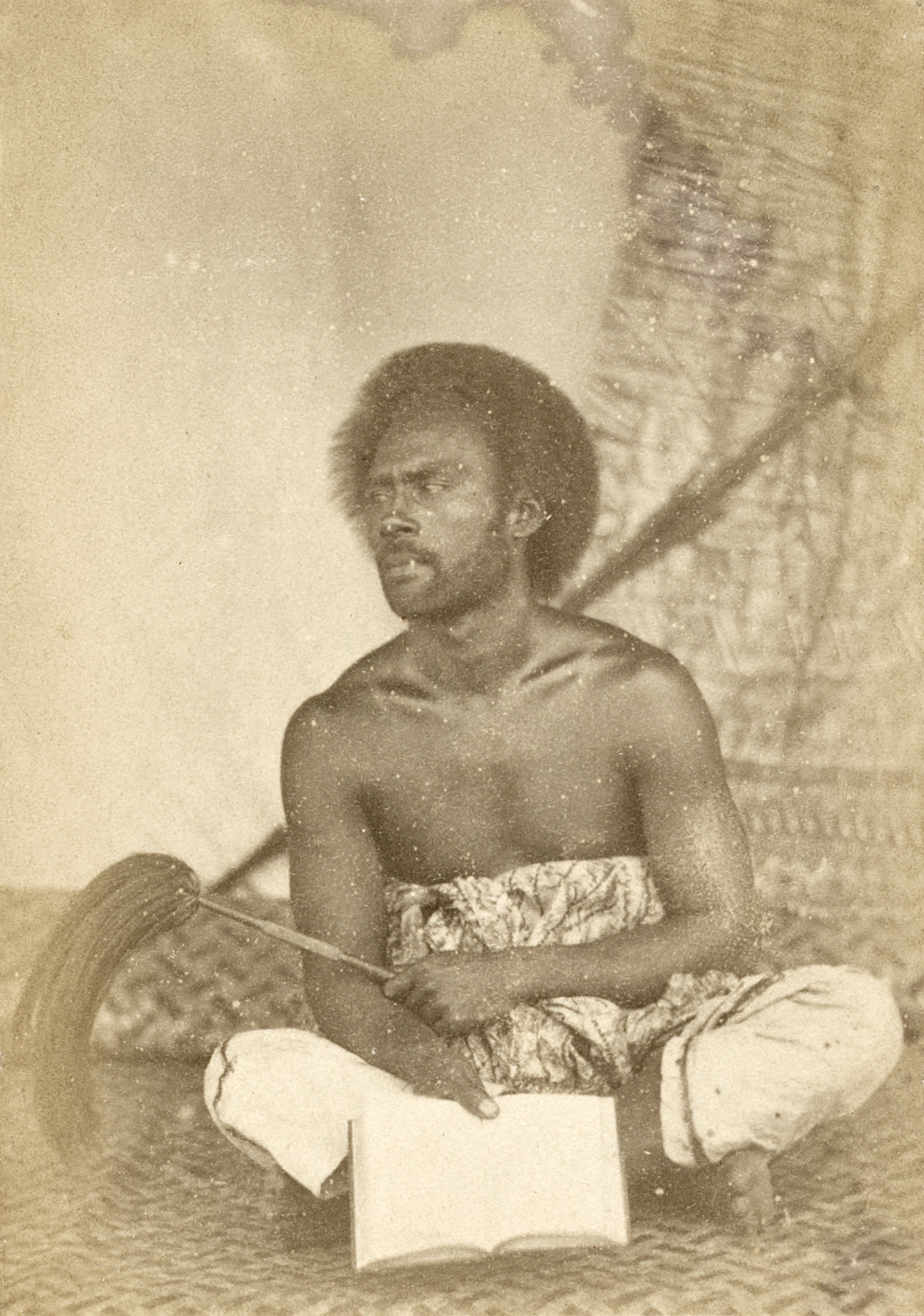
Fijian Chief with i-Roi

The i-Roi is a fly-whisk used particularly amongst the high ranking chiefs (Ratu) in Fiji.

Used for ceremonial purposes, the i-Roi has been a key part of the Fijian Chief system and its status among the Itaukei is similar to the Samoan fue. It has been incorporated into the culture of Fiji in relation to dominance, leadership and royal power. They can be made of coconut fibre, known as coir, attached to a wooden handle.
