= Vaepule Alo Vaemoa Vaai =

Samoan lawyer and judge (c.1953–2020)

Vaepule Alo Vaemoa Vaai (c. 1953 – 25 September 2020) was a Samoan lawyer and judge. He served on the Supreme Court of Samoa from 2016 until 2019. He was the son of former Prime Minister Vaʻai Kolone.

Vaepule is from the village of Vaisala in Savai'i. He was educated at Vaisala Primary School, Leififi Intermediate, Samoa College, and then Wellington College in New Zealand. He studied law at Victoria University of Wellington, graduating in 1982 with an LLB. He returned to Samoa and practiced as a barrister and solicitor for 12 years before working for the National Provident Fund. From 2001 to 2004, he served as Public Trustee. He was appointed to the District Court of Samoa in 2004. In December 2016, he was appointed to the Supreme Court of Samoa. He resigned as a judge in 2019.

Vaepule was married to Letuimanuasina Emma Kruse Va'ai.
