= ʻAiga =

Family unit in traditional Samoan society

The ʻaiga ('family') is the basic social unit of traditional Samoan society. ʻAiga consists of a wider family group of blood and marriage or even adopted connections who all acknowledge the same matai (head of the family). Such a matai is a titled person, either a chief (aliʻi) or an orator (tulafale or failauga) whose particular duty is the leadership and care of the family under their control, and who is entitled to the services and co-operation of all members of their family in return for leadership. In Samoan custom relationship may be claimed through female as well as male ancestors. Samoans may belong to many families or different ʻaiga since a woman marrying into another family confers on all her blood descendants membership of her own.

A matai may be either male or female and they are selected by consensus of the ʻaiga and bestowed the particular matai title belonging to that family. All members of such a family group need not necessarily live under the same roof or even in the same village but will when occasion requires it assemble, generally at the residence of the matai, to discuss family affairs or any happenings affecting the interests of the family, or to discharge the duties associated with deaths or weddings. It is the duty of the matai to take care of the family land and to apportion it for the use of members of the family in return for services rendered to them as head of the family.

All outward expressions of the respect and esteem in which an ʻaiga may be held both by the village and the district or the whole of Samoa, may properly be directed to the matai. They are the trustee of the good name of the family and the fountain-head to which all ceremonial recognition of the status of the family is due. Matai are also responsible for the proper maintenance of the dignity of the family and the adequate performance of their social obligations. If the matai is not shown proper respect on any occasion, that omission is resented as a slight to the family themselves. On the other hand, if the conduct of the matai in any way falls short of the standard expected, the displeasure of the community and the shame associated therewith will be shared by the family.

Another aspect of family organisation which is very important in Samoan custom, is that which deals with the male and female lines of descent of a family. A proper consideration of the interplay of rights and duties in two such lines of descent would open up the very wide field of the relationship known as the feagaiga. The traditional relationships raised by the feagaiga permeate the whole of Samoan society, and must always be taken into account at the time of the choice of a new matai and on other important occasions including marriages and deaths.

== See also ==
- Ambilineality
- Faʻamatai
- ʻOhana
- Samoan culture
- Whānau
