= Miti hue =

Polynesian fermented coconut sauce

Miti
- Alternative names: Hami, Samilolo, Tähroro, Tai monomono
- Type: Condiment
- Place of origin: Polynesia
- Region or state: American Samoa, Cook Islands, French Polynesia, Rotuma, Samoa, Tonga
- Main ingredients: Coconut, Brine

Miti is a traditional sauce in Polynesian cuisine made from the flesh of the coconut and salty sea water (which it originally meant in Tahitian) mixed together. There are two types of miti known: miti haʻari uses freshly extracted coconut milk prior to immediate serving, and miti hue in which the miti is stored in a calabash vessel (hue) and left to preserve for a while prior to consumption.

The miti is one of three main components of the Tahitian cuisine other than māʻa (staple starch like breadfruit) and ʻīnaʻi (accompanying dishes like meats and vegetables).

== Preparation ==
=== Miti haʻari ===
The coconut milk base is flavoured with onions and garlic. This kind of miti can be also found in Fiji flavoured with juice of citruses.

=== Miti hue ===
Miti hue (or mitihue) is prepared from the young coconut known as 'omoto, a stage where the flesh of the green coconut starts to harden and begins losing its water. The flesh of the 'omoto is cut into pieces and placed in calabashes, with salt water and the heads of freshwater prawns. The mixture is left in the sun for a few days to ferment. Miti hue is served as an accompaniment to traditional Tahitian dishes, most notably the fermented fish dish Fafaru. The preparation of tai monomono is also similar to Miti hue, though crushed crustaceans are entirely absent from the recipe. Flavourings like lemon, lime and chilli can also be added to tai monomono, with the addition of chilli (ʻoporo) being known as Tai ʻoporo.

Fermented coconut sauce is also eaten in Tonga, the Samoan islands and the Polynesian island of Rotuma, but the process differs from Miti hue as the sauce is a byproduct of converting coconut shells into containers, a practice that was common in the West Polynesian islands. A mature coconut has a hole drilled into it and the water inside the nut is removed, replaced with sea water. A stopper is placed into the hole and left to ferment for a few weeks, resulting in the inner flesh breaking down into a gruel.

== Names ==
- Cook Islands: tai monomono
- French Polynesia: miti hue
- Rotuma: tähroro
- Samoan Islands (both Western and American): samilolo, niu faʻapala, sogi ma le isu
- Tonga: hami

== See also ==
- Taioro – A fermented paste made from coconut meat, eaten in Oceania.
