= Faʻa Sāmoa =

Customary way of life in Samoan culture

Faʻa Sāmoa, the 'Samoan Way', is the traditional/customary way of life in Samoan culture.

== Concept ==
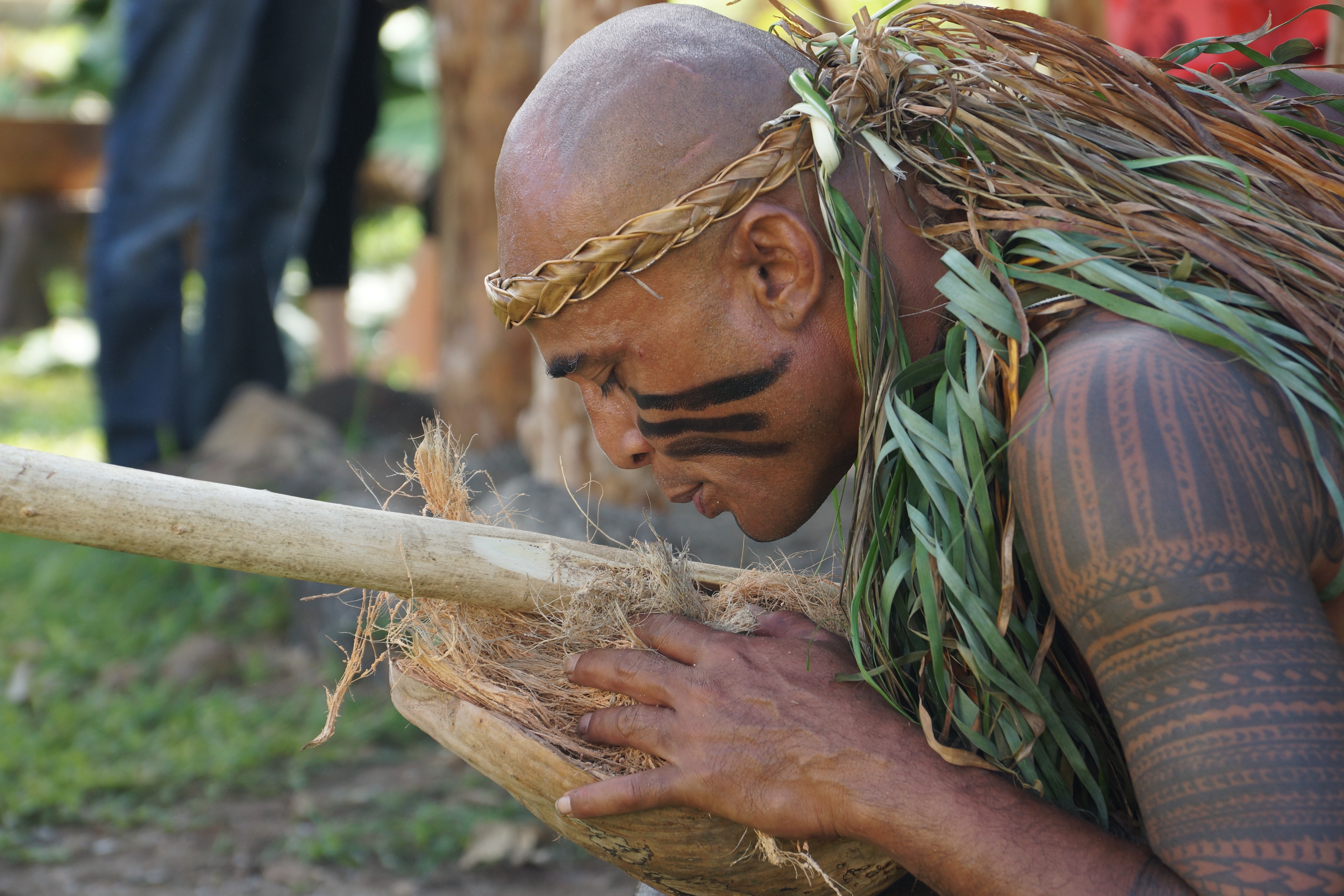
Samoan man participating in a ceremony

Faʻa Sāmoa consists of the Samoan language, customs of relationships, and culture, that constitute the traditional and continuing Polynesian lifestyle on Samoa and in the Samoan diaspora. It embraces an all-encompassing system of behavior and of responsibilities that spells out all Samoans' relationships to one another and to persons holding positions of authority. This is how Samoans are raised and live, and provides support and direction to individuals within family and political structures. Central to the organisation of Samoan society is the culture's faʻamatai, the traditional system of social organisation. Hosts have responsibility for the actions of their guests, and may incur a fine from the village authorities for infractions of local customs.

Faʻa Sāmoa includes the way one stands, walks and speaks, for example by saying "tulou" when one walks in front of someone who is seated. Likewise, it is extremely disrespectful to eat or drink when walking through a village.

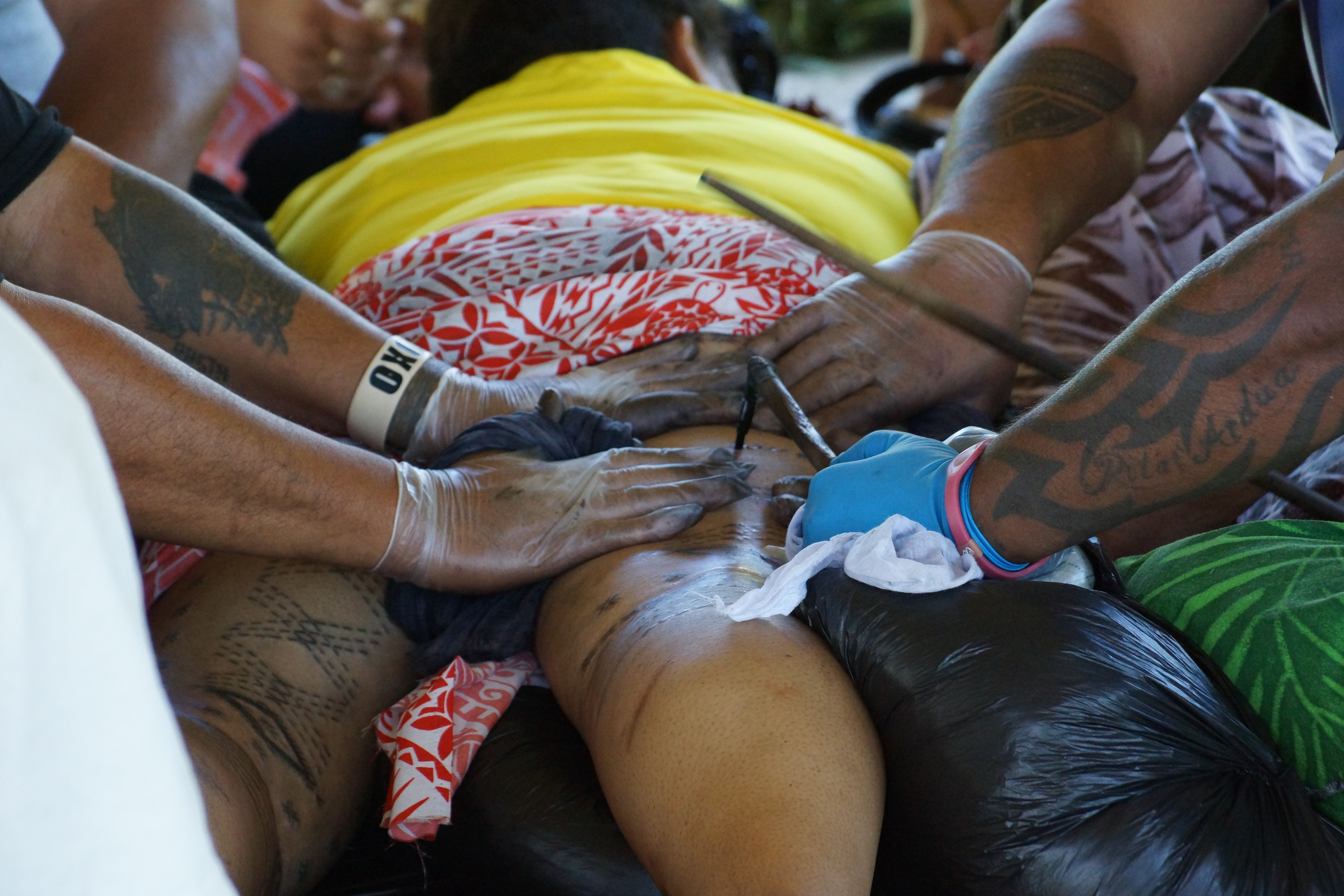
Traditional Samoan tattoo

As another example, most Samoan villages enforce a period of prayer in the early evening, signified by ringing a bell or by blowing a conch shell. During this brief curfew (the sa) one should not stop in the village if passing through. Appointed guardians, or aumaga, may stand by the road to ensure that travelers do not enter.

In addition to the set familial relationships, which extend to one's entire extended family (the ‘aiga) with its familial chief (the matai), Samoans show respect to persons in positions of authority, and reverently observe customs of long standing which have rather more force than mere etiquette.

== History ==
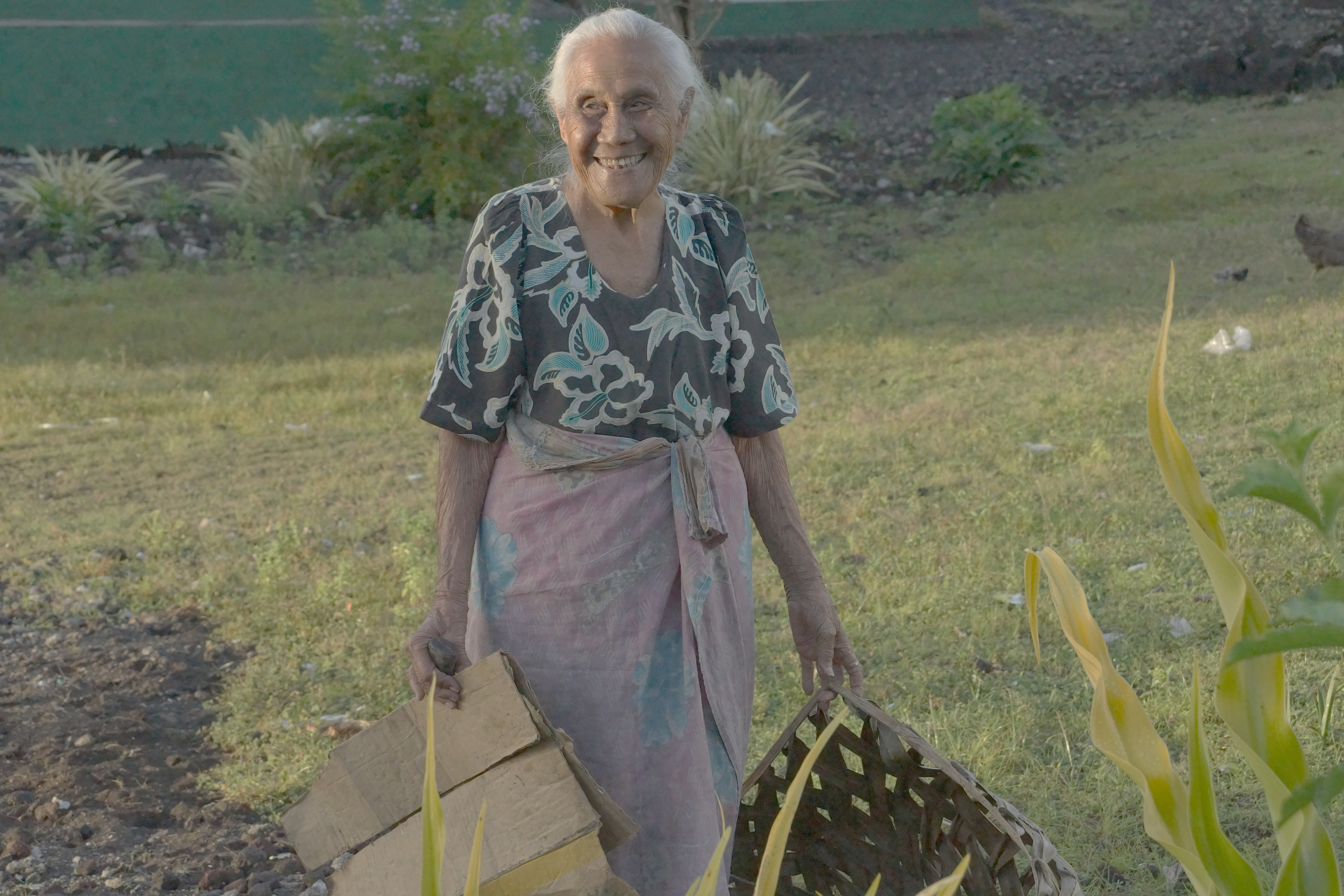
Samoan elder

When missionaries arrived from Europe in 1830, they found ways to associate Samoan cultural beliefs with Christianity, which contributed to the spread of Christianity in 19th-century Samoa. An example of these purportedly shared beliefs is the respect of one's elders. In faʻa Sāmoa, the young respect older generations, especially their parents and grandparents.

== Gallery ==
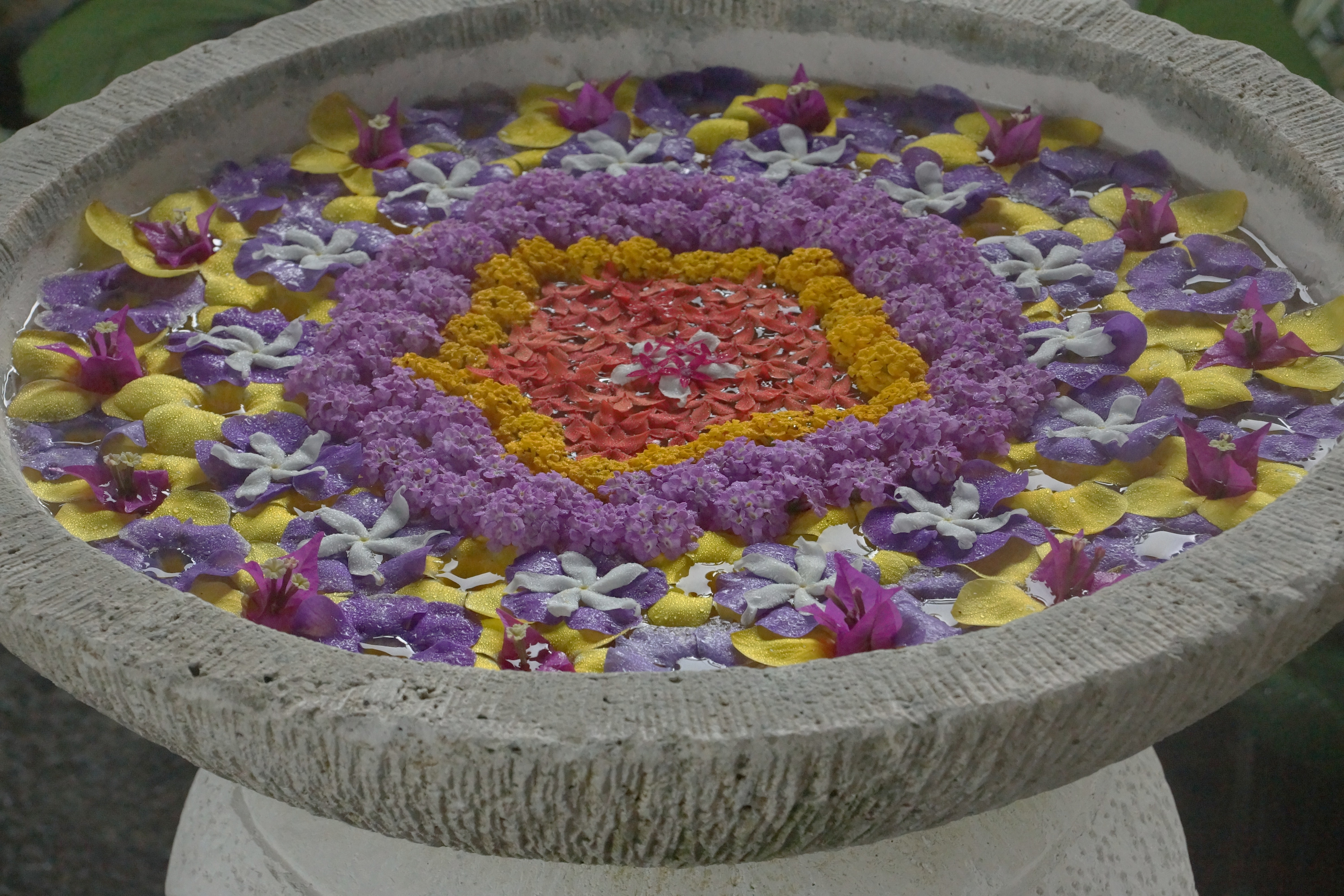
Flower lei

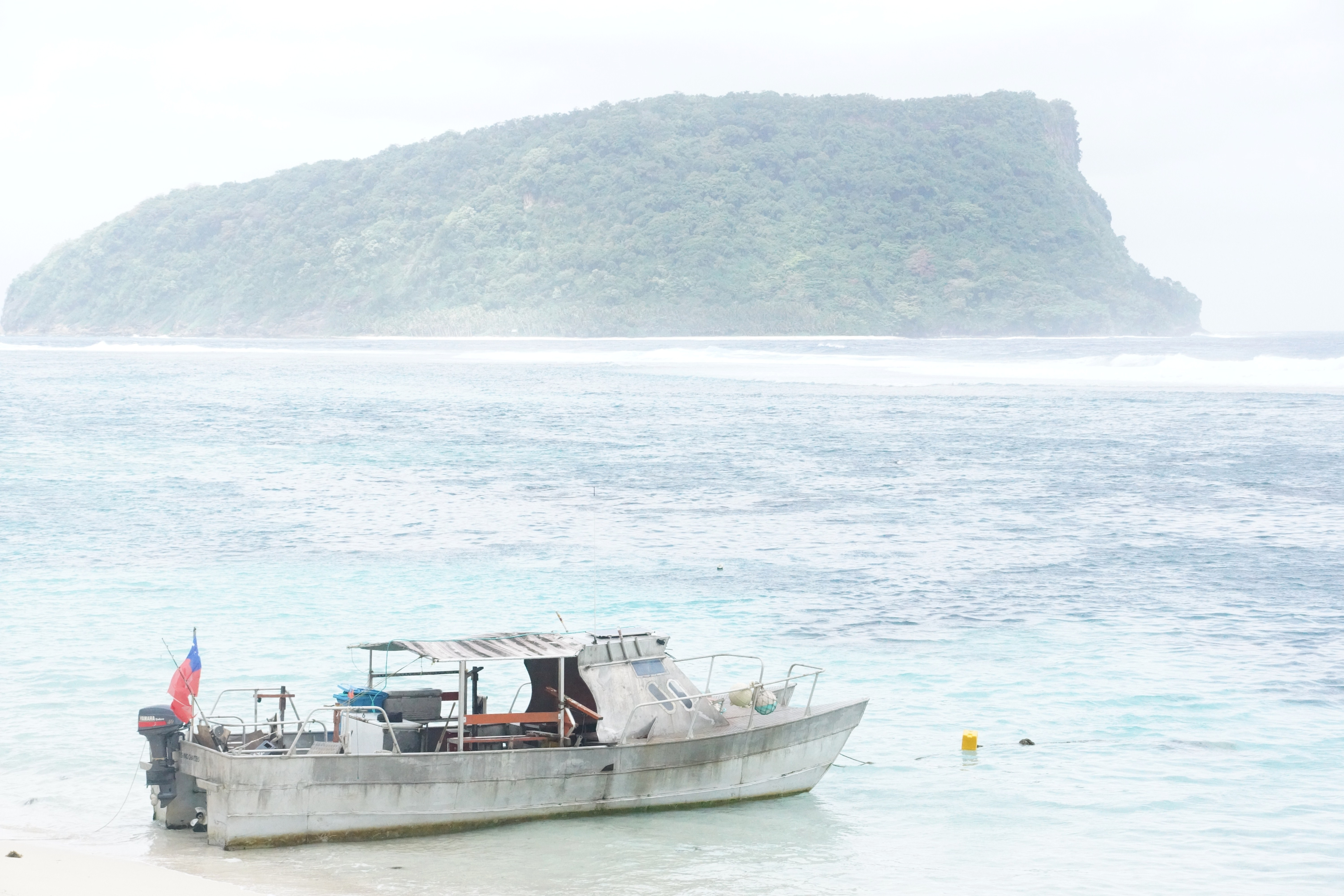
The ocean connects the islands of Samoa

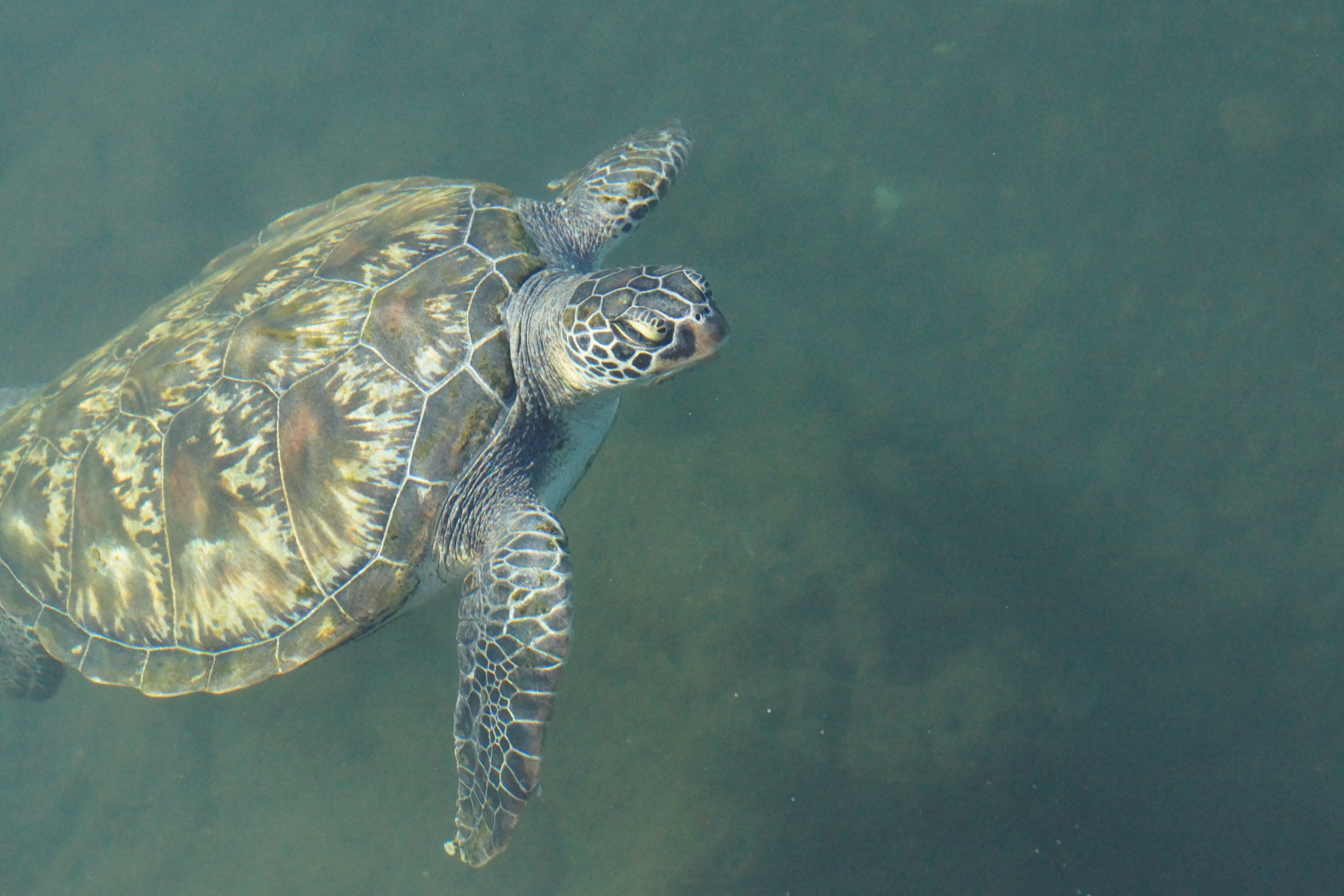
Sea turtle in Samoa

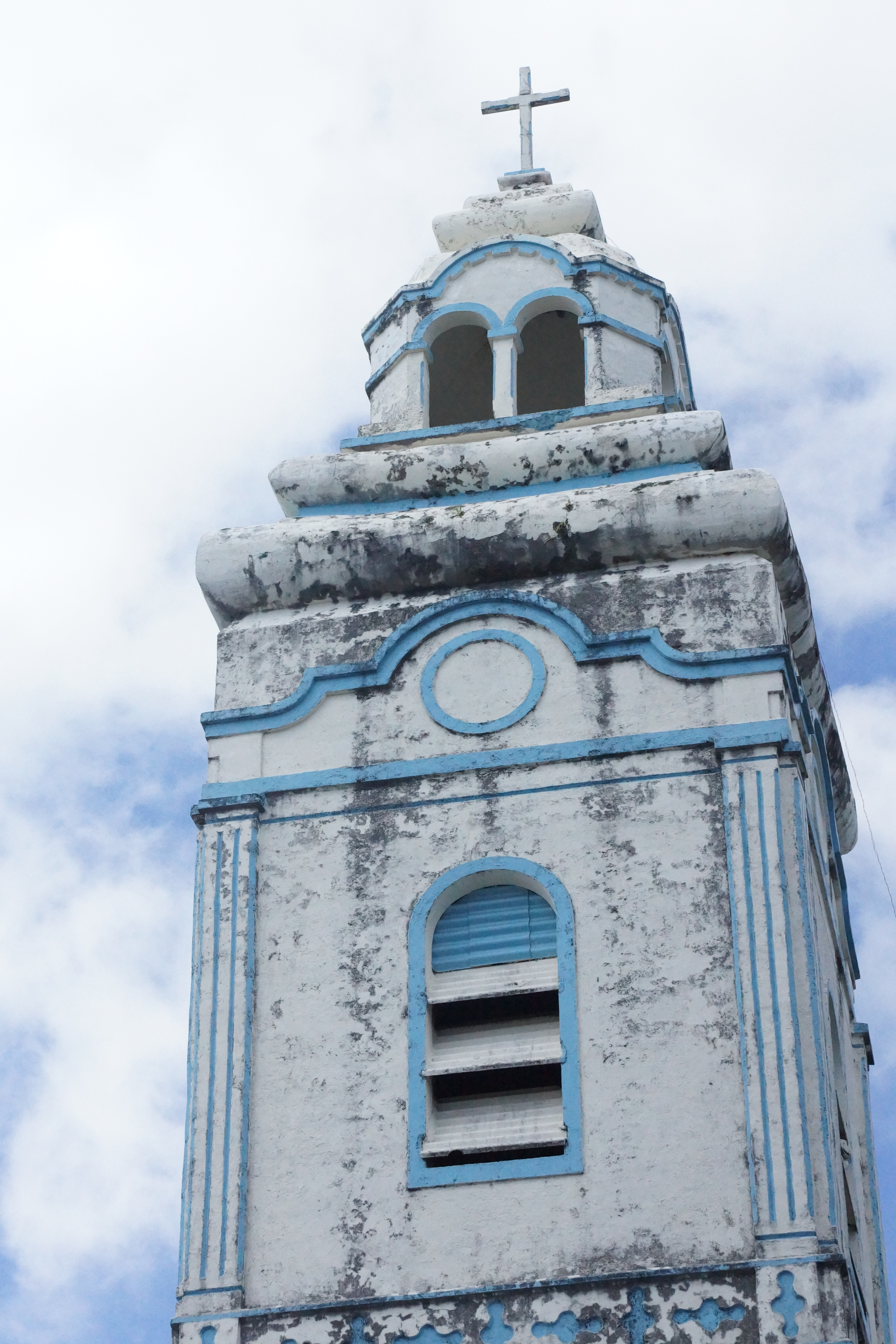
Christianity in Samoa

== See also ==
- Faʻamatai
