= Tuimalealiʻifano Vaʻaletoʻa Sualauvi II =

O le Ao o le Malo of Samoa since 2017

His Highness Afioga Tuimalealiʻifano Vaʻaletoʻa Sualauvi II
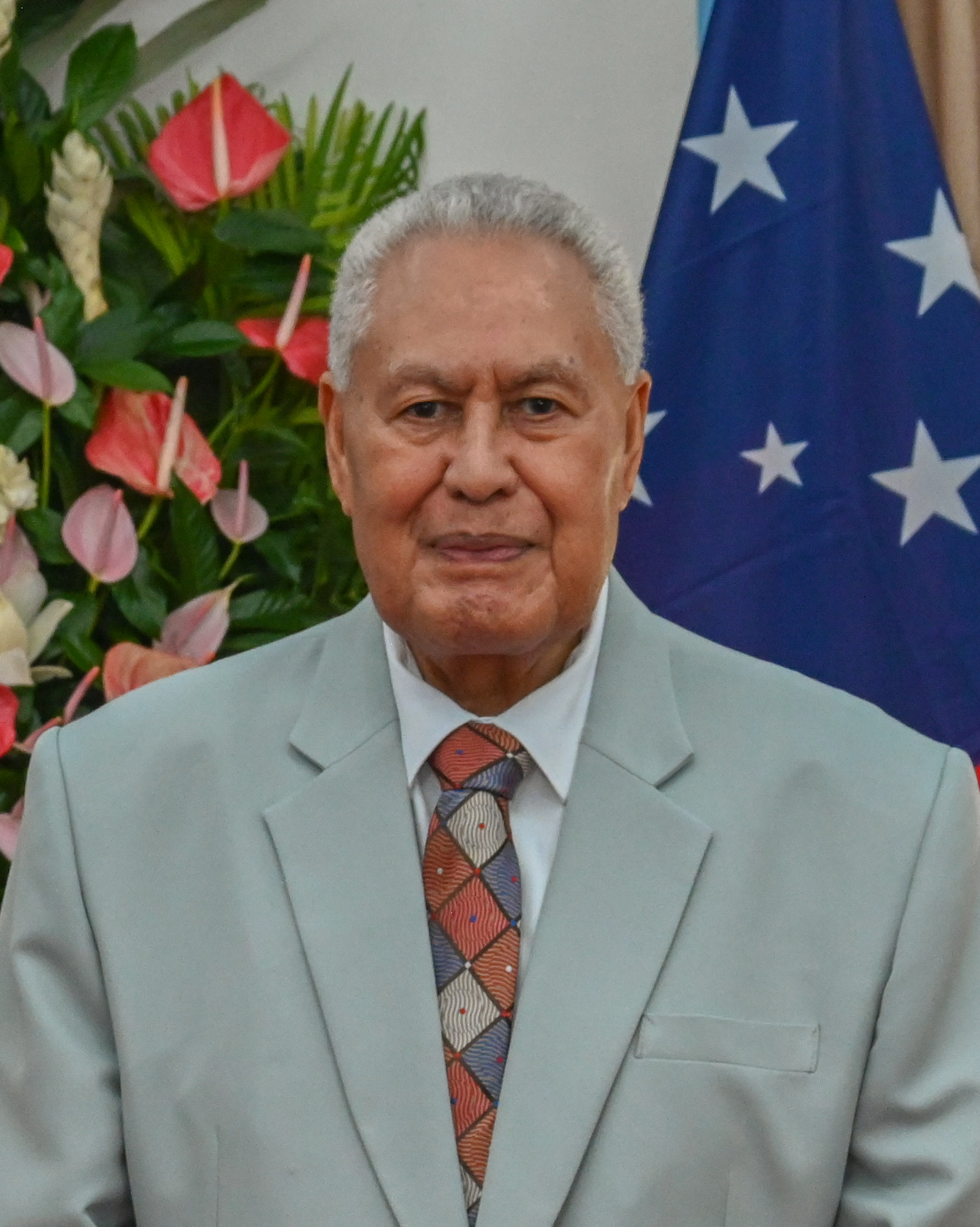
- Sualauvi in 2026

O le Ao o le Malo of Samoa
- Incumbent
- Assumed office 21 July 2017
- Prime Minister: Tuilaʻepa Saʻilele Malielegaoi; Fiamē Naomi Mataʻafa; Laʻauli Leuatea Schmidt
- Deputy: See list: Tuiloma Pule Lameko (until 2018); Le Mamea Ropati (until 2024); Tui Ātua Tupua Tamasese Efi (since 2025); Malietoa Moli II (since 2025); Le Laulu Tiatia Mapesone Mapusua (since 2025)
- Preceded by: Tui Ātua Tupua Tamasese Efi

Chancellor of the University of the South Pacific
- In office 1 July 2022 – 30 June 2023
- Preceded by: Dalton Tagelagi
- Succeeded by: David Vunagi

Personal details
- Born: 29 April 1947 (age 79) Western Samoa
- Party: Independent
- Spouse: Masiofo Faʻamausili Leinafo
- Education: Australian National University; Malua Theological College

Afioga Tuimalealiʻifano Vaʻaletoʻa Eti Sualauvi II (born 29 April 1947) is a Samoan politician who is the current O le Ao o le Malo (head of state) of Samoa, in office since 2017.

== Biography ==
He is a great-grandson of one of the Mau movement leaders, Tuimalealiʻifano Faʻaoloiʻi Siʻuaʻana I, and grand-nephew of Tuiaana Tuimalealiʻifano Suatipatipa II, who was the inaugural member of the Council of Deputies in 1962. He was appointed to the title of Tuimalealiʻifano in July 1977, a title formed out of a cadet branch of the Sā Tupua state dynasty and one of the four paramount chiefly titles of Samoa. He is married to Masiofo Faʻamausili Leinafo Tuimalealiʻifano.

== Early career ==
He worked as a policeman, lawyer and previously was a Samoan Police Chief Inspector and a secondary school teacher. He was a police officer in New Zealand for three years. He also served as a public-defender, public trustee, and barrister and solicitor in the Supreme Court of Samoa. He is an elder deacon and lay preacher for the Congregational Christian Church of Samoa in the village of Matautu Falelatai. He has preached sermons in Australia and New Zealand for the Christian Congregational Church of Samoa.

== Political career ==
=== 2001 parliamentary bid ===
During the 2001 general election, Tuimalealiʻifano ran for the legislative assembly contesting the constituency of Falelatai and Samatau as an independent candidate. His opponent was the incumbent representative Misa Telefoni Retzlaff of the Human Rights Protection Party. As a Tama-a-Aiga (lit. sons of the families) and holder of one of the four paramount Matai titles in Samoa, Tuimalealiʻifano filed his candidacy to restore prominence to his family title, which, according to him, went unrecognised in the public arena. (Note: In Samoa, electoral success tends to come from family ties, status and relationships rather than policy positions and political affiliation.) He also pointed out that current and past holders of the other three paramount Tama-a-Aiga had various monuments honouring them, which was not the case for his title. Once Tuimalealiʻifano launched his candidacy, he sought the endorsement of the Falelatai village council; however, they instead backed Misa. The reason why they refused to support Tuimalealiʻifano was that they could not bear to see a Tama-a-Aiga be involved in a political conflict where they would face ridicule, damaging the title. The council also mentioned that should Tuimalealiʻifano be victorious, his role in parliament as an independent would most likely be minor. They instead attempted to convince Tuimalealiʻifano to remain a member of the Council of Deputies and explained to him that he was likely to become the next head of state. Tuimalealiʻifano refused to withdraw, to which the council responded, "then do as you please". He then continued to argue against the council's decision and brought up delicate issues which inflamed tensions between himself and the council. Tuimalealiʻifano was ultimately defeated in a landslide by Misa, earning 38% of the vote to his opponent's 61%.

Tuimalealiʻifano's parliamentary bid left him in over WS$200,000 in debt. Increased tensions during the campaign led the village council to banish Tuimalealiʻifano from Falelatai several weeks after the election. Some individuals who voted for Tuimalealiʻifano were also banished.

=== O le Ao o le Malo ===
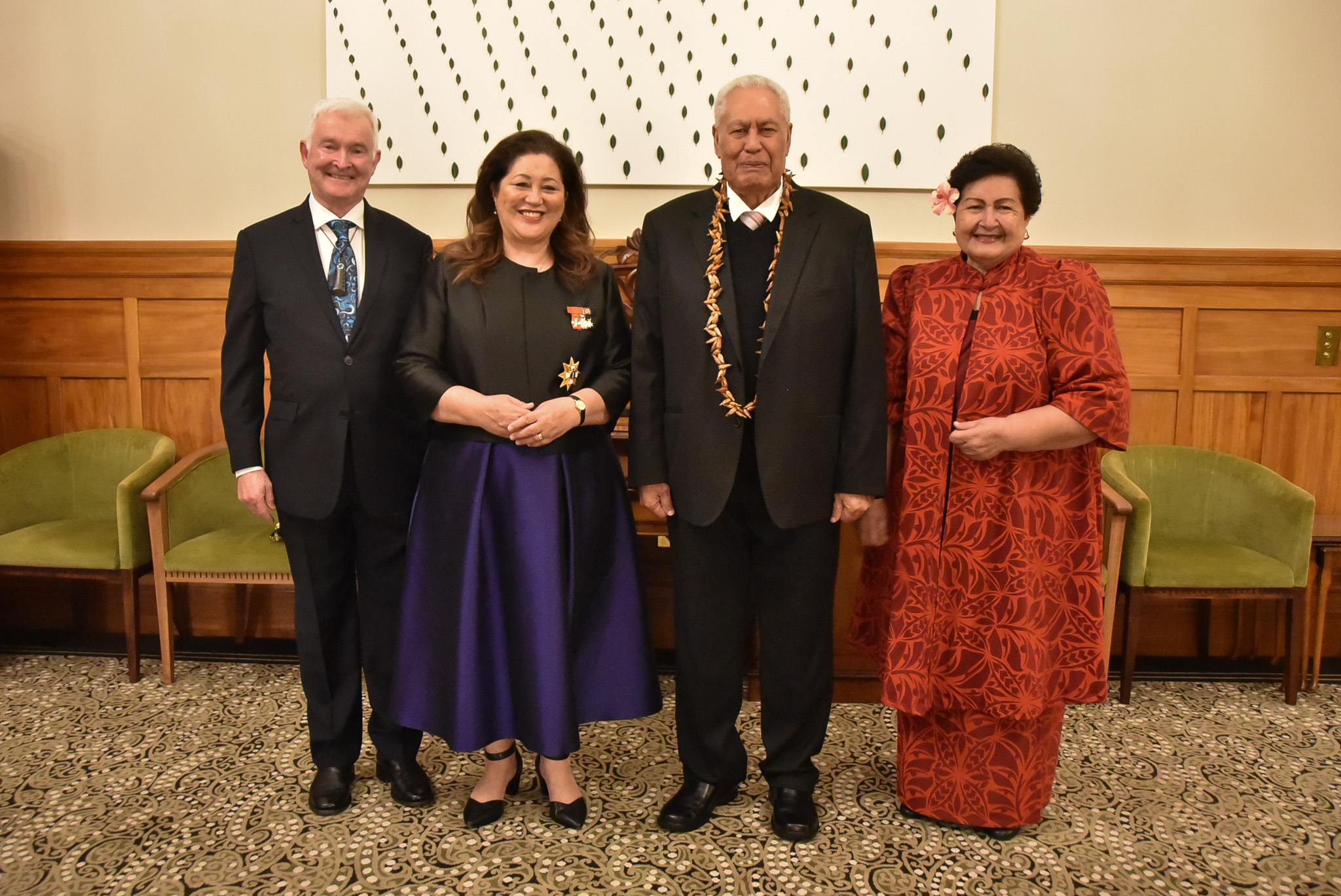
Tuimalealiʻifano and his wife, Masiofo Faamausili Leinafo, with the Governor-General of New Zealand Dame Cindy Kiro and her husband Richard Davies in May 2024

In 2017, he was elected to succeed Tui Ātua Tupua Tamasese Efi as the head of state (O le Ao o le Malo) of Samoa, having previously been a member of the Council of Deputies to the Head of State from 1993 to 2001 and since 2004. He was sworn in on 21 July 2017. In 2019, he hosted the visit of President Russell M. Nelson of the Church of Jesus Christ of Latter-day Saints.

In May 2021, Sualauvi purported to revoke the results of the 2021 election and call new elections. The decision was overturned by the Samoa Supreme Court on 17 May 2021. Sualauvi then issued a proclamation to prevent the Legislative Assembly of Samoa from meeting, triggering a constitutional crisis.

In July 2022 his term of office was extended until the next parliamentary sitting in August. On 23 August 2022 he was reappointed as head of state for a further five-year term.

On 1 July 2022, his one-year term as the 29th chancellor of the University of the South Pacific commenced, succeeding Niue's Dalton Tagelagi. He was succeeded by Solomon Islands Governor-General David Vunagi in 2023.

== Education ==
Sualauvi has a Bachelor of Laws (LLB) degree from the Australian National University and a Certificate and Diploma in Theological Studies from Malua Theological College.

== Notes ==
Regnal titles
Preceded by Tuiaana Tuimaleali'ifano Suatipatipa II	Tuimalealiʻifano; 1977–present	Incumbent
Political offices
Preceded by Malietoa Tanumafili II	O le Ao o le Malo of Samoa; Acting; 2007; Served alongside: Tui Ātua Tupua Tamasese Efi	Succeeded by Tui Ātua Tupua Tamasese Efi
Preceded by Tui Ātua Tupua Tamasese Efi	O le Ao o le Malo of Samoa; 2017–present	Incumbent
Academic offices
Preceded by Dalton Tagelagi	Chancellor of the University of the South Pacific; 2022–2023	Succeeded by David Vunagi
