= 1926 Western Samoan general election =

General elections were held in Western Samoa on 30 November 1926.

== Background ==
Elections had taken place for the Legislative Council for the first time in 1924. Alongside six 'official' members (civil servants) and three nominated 'unofficial' members, a further three members were elected in a vote in which candidacy and the franchise was restricted to Europeans.

In a Legislative Council debate on 13 October 1925, Olaf Frederick Nelson, one of the elected members, had proposed that native Samoans should also be represented in the Council. Although the motion was seconded by Arthur Williams, one of the other elected members, it was rejected.

An amendment to the Samoa Act 1921 approved in August 1926 replaced the provision for six unofficial members to "between four and six" unofficial members.

== Electoral system ==
The franchise remained restricted to European men aged 21 or over that owned property with a value of at least £200, or had an annual salary (in Samoa) of at least £200. The qualification criteria excluded a significant proportion of the European population from voting. A total of 222 voters were registered.

== Campaign ==
Six candidates contested the elections; the three members elected in 1926, Alexander W. Johnston, Norman MacDonald and Alfred James Tattersall.

== Results ==
All three members elected in 1924 – Nelson, Williams and George Westbrook – were re-elected. Partial results were published in the Samoanische Zeitung on 3 December with four polling stations yet to report, giving Nelson 121 votes, Williams 114, Westbrook 101, MacDonald 61, Johnston 60 and Tattersall 59.

== Aftermath ==
The Governor-General of New Zealand reappointed the Chief Judge, the Crown Solicitor, the Public Trustee, the Secretary to the Administration, the Secretary of Native Affairs and the Treasurer as the official members. In 1927 the Public Trustee and the Treasurer were replaced by the Chief Medical Officer and the Director of Agriculture. In August 1929 the Chief Judge and Director of Agriculture were replaced by the Collector of Customs and the Treasurer.
