= Tamaʻāiga =

Term used for the four paramount chiefly titles of Samoa

Tamaʻāiga (meaning "sons of the families") is a Samoan term used to refer to the four high chiefly titles in the faʻamatai system of the Independent State of Samoa – the Malietoa, Mataʻafa, Tupua Tamasese and Tuimalealiʻifano. American Samoa has its own paramount chiefs, known as Faʻasuaga, who are the sole authority of their districts – the Leʻiato, Faumuina, Mauga, Tuitele, Fuimaono, Sātele, Letuli, and Tui Manuʻa.

== History ==
The term first emerged during the ascension of Fuiavailili in the aftermath of King Muagututia's death in the late 17th century. Before affirming his kingship, the powerful orator polities of Lufilufi and Leulumoega had to first verify his royal pedigree by identifying the families and lineages to which he was connected. Having been satisfied, the orator polity declared Fuiavailili was a tama a ʻāiga, owing to his ancestry and links to the great families of Samoa and was subsequently proclaimed king.

By the last quarter of the 19th century, the status of the four dominant high chiefly dynasties – Malietoa, Mataʻafa, Tupua Tamasese, and Tuimalealiʻifano were formalized as tamaʻāiga. The tamaʻāiga co-existed with the older concept of pāpā, which covered the four previously dominant dynastic titles of Gatoaʻitele, Tamasoaliʻi, Tui Aʻana, and Tui Ātua. These four titles are held almost exclusively by tamaʻāiga. From the 16th century, these four pāpā titles, if held jointly by the same person, made that person the tafaʻifa, or sovereign over all of Samoa. Two notable tafaʻifa holders were Nāfanua and Salamāsina, although this title ceased to be in common usage during the 19th century, when they were banned by colonial powers. The titles are resurgent today, with all but one pāpā title, Tamasoaliʻi, currently held by an incumbent.

Since the independence of Samoa in 1962, the position of Head of State (O le Ao o le Malo) has been held by one of the tamaʻāiga, in accordance with cultural convention. Two other paramount chiefs – Fiamē Mataʻafa Faumuina Mulinuʻu II and Tupua Tamasese Lealofi IV – also each served as prime minister of Samoa.

== See also ==
- Faʻamatai
- Politics of Samoa
- History of Samoa
