= Mataʻafa Faumuina Fiame Mulinuʻu I =

Samoan high chief and independence leader (1889–1948)

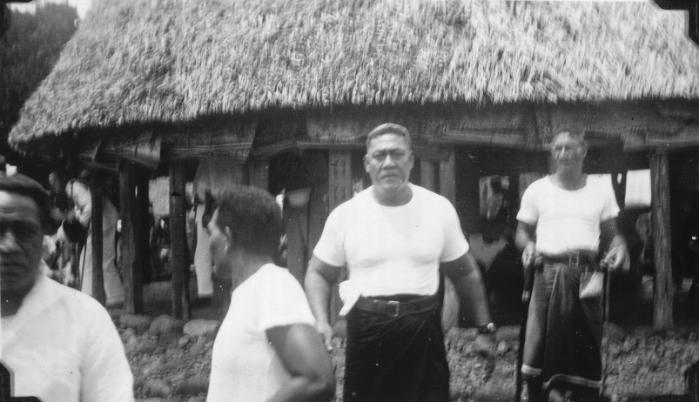
Mataʻafa Faumuina Fiame Mulinuʻu I (centre, facing camera), 1930

Mataʻafa Faumuina Fiame Mulinuʻu I (1889 – 27 March 1948) was a high chief of Samoa and a leader of the country's pro-independence Mau movement during the 1920s and 1930s. He was the holder of high-ranking aliʻi chiefly titles: the Tamaʻāiga Mataʻafa, Fiame from Lotofaga and Faumuina from Lepea.

== Mau Movement ==
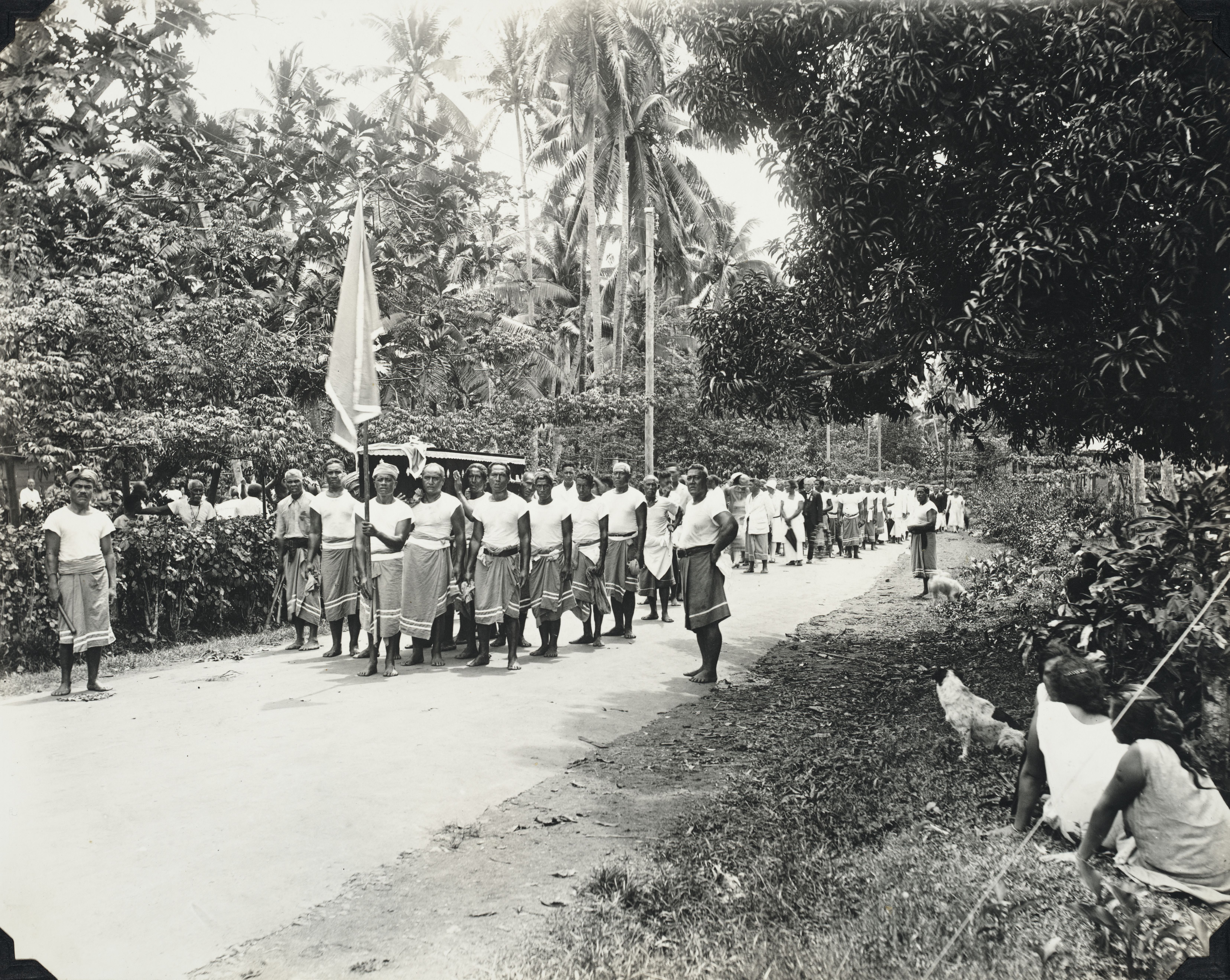
Mau carrying the coffin of Tupua Tamasese Lealofi III. Standing to the right wearing a single white stripe on his lava-lava, the Mau uniform, is Mataʻafa Faumuina Fiame Mulinuʻu I.

Faumuina initially cooperated with the New Zealand colonial administration, remodelling his village of Lepea along the "model village" lines demanded by Administrator George Spafford Richardson. In late 1926 he attended a meeting with Olaf Frederick Nelson and other independence activists at the home of Samuel Meredith to plan the response to an inquiry into Samoan grievances. This led to the formation of the citizens committee, which became the Mau. Faumuina suggested that the committee hold public meetings to discuss their grievances, and was a prominent speaker at the first two, calling for lawful change. When he assisted in raising funds for the Mau to send a delegation to New Zealand, he was confined to his village for three months. He was subsequently banished to Apolima. He was later sent to Lotofaga on Upolu. In October 1927 he was allowed to return to Apia to give evidence before the royal commission.

Following the exile of Olaf Frederick Nelson and arrest of Tupua Tamasese Lealofi III Faumuina became the effective leader of the Mau. He was one of the leaders of the procession on Black Saturday, and attempted to hold back the crowd when the shooting started. He was lightly injured, with a bullet grazing his back. The death of Tamasese left Faumuina as the undisputed leader of the movement, and he was put on a wanted list for a speech he had given months before. He went into hiding with other Mau members, but emerged in March 1930 for peace talks with the colonial administration. Following the negotiations, he led 300 members of the Mau to Apia to surrender. Over the next five years Faumuina continued to lead the Mau and keep the peace.

== Reconciliation ==
Following the election of the First Labour Government of New Zealand in the 1935 New Zealand general election New Zealand policy towards Samoa changed, and the ban on the Mau was lifted. Faumuina negotiated with the new government, and gained concessions towards self-government. In October 1936 he was appointed senior sergeant in the newly-formed native police force. later that month the newly elected Fono recommended that he be appointed to the Legislative Council. In January 1937 he was appointed supervisor of native police. Eventually he rose to the rank of inspector.

In March 1939, he succeeded Mataʻafa Salanoa Muliufi as Mataʻafa following a hearing by the Samoan Land and Titles Commission. This was the first time the Mataʻafa title passed from the elder line of Faasuamaleʻaui to the younger line of Silupevailei, which held the title until it was passed back following the death of his son and successor in 1975.

In February 1944 he was appointed to the position of Fautua, one of three advisors to the Administrator.

He died at Apia Hospital on 27 March 1948 at the age of 58, and was subsequently given a state funeral.

== Legacy ==
His wife Faʻamusami, was the daughter of paramount chief Malietoa Laupepa. His son, Fiame Mataʻafa Faumuina Mulinuʻu II (1921–1975) became the first Prime Minister of Western Samoa at the country's independence from New Zealand colonial administration. His granddaughter, Fiame Naomi Mataʻafa is a high-ranking chief Lotofaga, the head of Aiga Sā Levalasi and is the current Prime Minister of Samoa.
