= 1924 Western Samoan general election =

General elections were held in Western Samoa on 23 January 1924.

== Background ==
A Legislative Council was established by the Samoa Constitution Order 1920, which provided for an unelected body of at least four 'official' members (civil servants) and a number of nominated 'unofficial' members, who were not allowed to outnumber the official members. The first Legislative Council consisted of the Chief Judge, the Commissioner of the Crown Estates, the Secretary to the Administration, the Secretary of Native Affairs and the Treasurer, with Arthur Keeling, Fred E. Syddall and Alfred James Tattersall as the unofficial members. The Samoa Constitution Order 1920 was superseded by the Samoa Act 1921, although the membership of the Legislative Council remained unchanged until 1923, when an amendment (the Samoa Legislative Council (Elective Membership) Order 1923) increased the number of members to twelve, with six official members and six unofficial members, three of which were to be appointed and three of which were to be elected.

== Electoral system ==
The franchise was restricted to European men aged 21 or over that owned property with a value of at least £200, or had an annual salary (in Samoa) of at least £200. The qualification criteria excluded a significant proportion of the European population from voting. A total of 214 voters were enrolled, 85% of whom were based in Apia.

== Results ==
Nine candidates contested the elections. The three elected members were the merchants Olaf Frederick Nelson and George Westbrook, and the plumber Arthur Williams.

=== Apia ===
Results for Apia were published in the Samoanische Zeitung on 25 January.

Candidate	Votes	%
Olaf Frederick Nelson	75	18.66
Arthur Williams	74	18.41
George Westbrook	70	17.41
F. D. Baxter	55	13.68
Alfred Smyth	49	12.19
Cecil Gardiner	38	9.45
A. Loibl	17	4.23
Samuel Meredith	15	3.73
B. M. Brush	9	2.24
Total	402	100.00
Source: Samoanische Zeitung

== Aftermath ==
On 2 February 1924 the Governor-General of New Zealand appointed the Chief Judge, the Collector of Customs, the Crown Solicitor, the Secretary to the Administration, the Secretary of Native Affairs and the Treasurer as the official members. The Collector of Customs was replaced by the Public Trustee at a later date.
