= 1929 Western Samoan general election =

General elections were held in Western Samoa on 6 November 1929.

== Background ==
In a Legislative Council debate of 16 March 1928, elected member Olaf Frederick Nelson proposed a motion that Samoans should be represented in the council. Nelson had made the same proposal in the 1924–1926 Council term, but it had been rejected. The new motion was defeated again.

On 5 August 1927, the New Zealand Parliament passed an amendment to the Samoa Act 1921, giving the Administrator the power to deport Europeans without trial in cases where they had reason to believe were "preventing or hindering the due performance of the Government of the Dominion of New Zealand, of its functions and duties.. or the due administration of the executive government of the Territory." This power was subsequently used to deport Nelson, who was replaced by an appointed member, Alexander W. Johnston in April 1928.

Despite Nelson's motion to include Samoan representatives having been defeated, prior to the 1929 elections the New Zealand government amended the structure of the Legislative Council to reduce the number of elected Europeans from three to two, and introduce two nominated Samoan members.

== Results ==
Prior to the elections, Johnston resigned from his nominated seat and stood for one of the elective seats. He was elected with the most votes, alongside Samuel Meredith.

Candidate	Votes	%	Notes
Alexander W. Johnston	87	31.75	Elected
Samuel Meredith	83	30.29	Elected
Cecil Gardiner	63	22.99	
Arthur Williams	41	14.96	Unseated
Total	274	100.00	
Source: Samoanische Zeitung

== Aftermath ==
Following the elections, Malietoa Tanumafili I and Mata'afa Muliufi were appointed as the Samoan representatives.
