= George Westbrook =

Samoan politician

Member of the Legislative Council
- In office 1924–1929

Personal details
- Born: 1860; Camberwell, United Kingdom
- Died: 31 January 1939 (aged 78); Apia, Western Samoa
- Profession: Businessman

George Egerton Leigh Westbrook (1860–31 January 1939) was a Western Samoan businessman and politician. He was a member of the Legislative Council from 1924 until 1929.

== Biography ==
Born in Camberwell in London England, Westbrook sailed to New Zealand on the full-rigged ship Famenoth, before beginning to travel the Pacific. He moved between Tahiti, the Marshall Islands and the Caroline Islands, before settling in Samoa in 1891. He became a shop keeper, married a Samoan woman, and was the Apia correspondent for the New Zealand Herald.

In January 1924 Westbrook successfully contested the first elections to the Samoan Legislative Council, becoming one of the first three elected members. He was re-elected in the 1926 elections. In 1928 Westbrook was declared bankrupt, and he did not run for re-election in 1929. Like fellow elected members Olaf Frederick Nelson and Arthur Williams, he was a member of the anti-colonial Mau movement.

In 1935 he published an autobiographical book named Gods Who Die: The Story of Samoa's Greatest Adventurer about his travels around the Pacific in the late 19th century.

He died on 31 January 1939 at the age of 78.
