= Lepea =

Lepea Piula
- Village
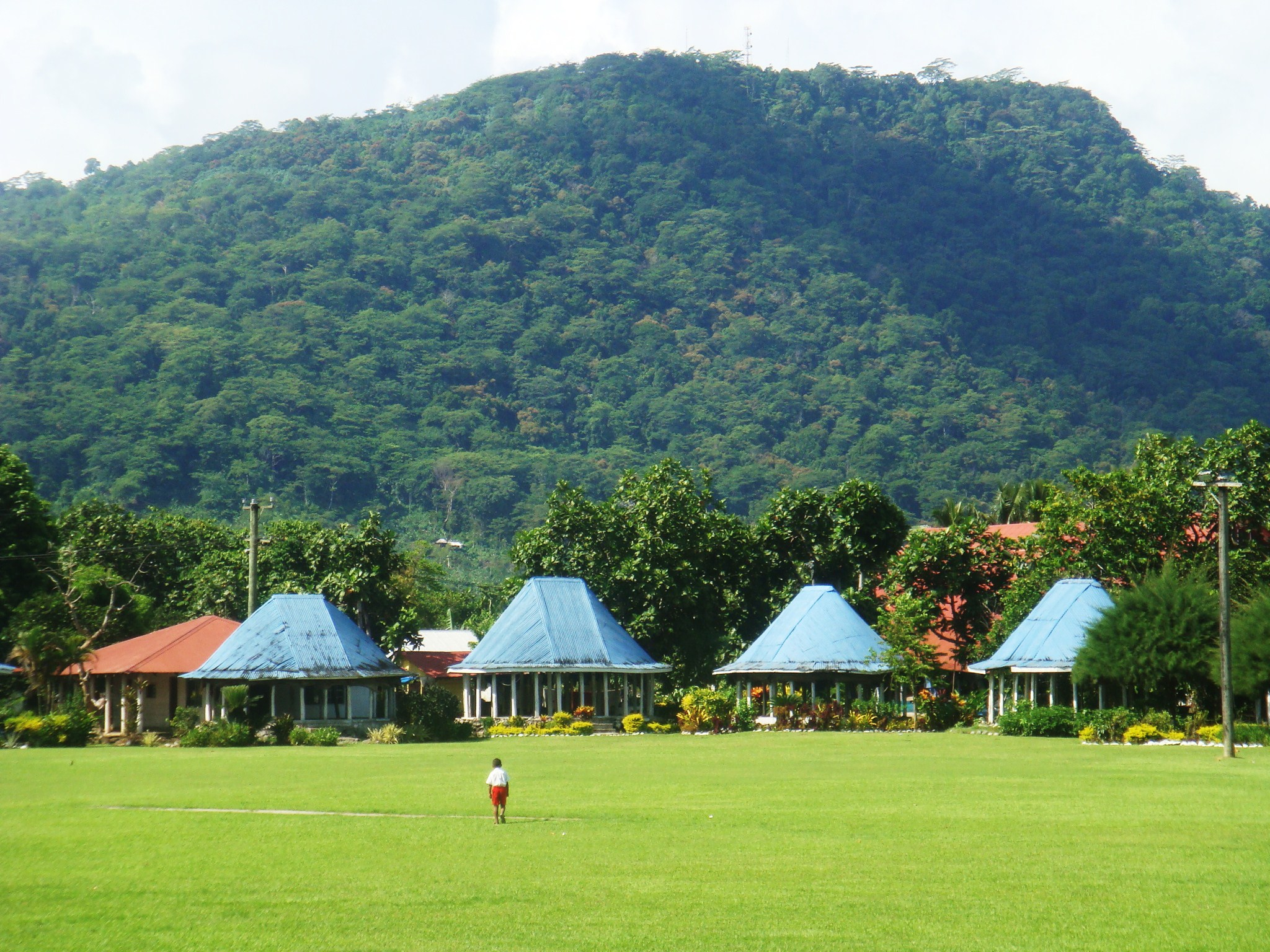
- Round Samoan meeting houses (fale tele) with blue painted roofs in Lepea village with Mount Vaea beyond, the burial place of Robert Louis Stevenson.

- Location within Samoa
- Coordinates: 13°50′S 171°47′W
- Country: Samoa
- District: Tuamasaga

Population (2016)
  - Total: 606
- Time zone: -11

Lepea is a village on the island of Upolu in Samoa. The picturesque settlement of round Samoan houses built in a concentric pattern in large open grounds (malae) is situated 5 minutes drive west of the capital Apia on the north central coast of the island. It is part of the Tuamasaga electoral district.

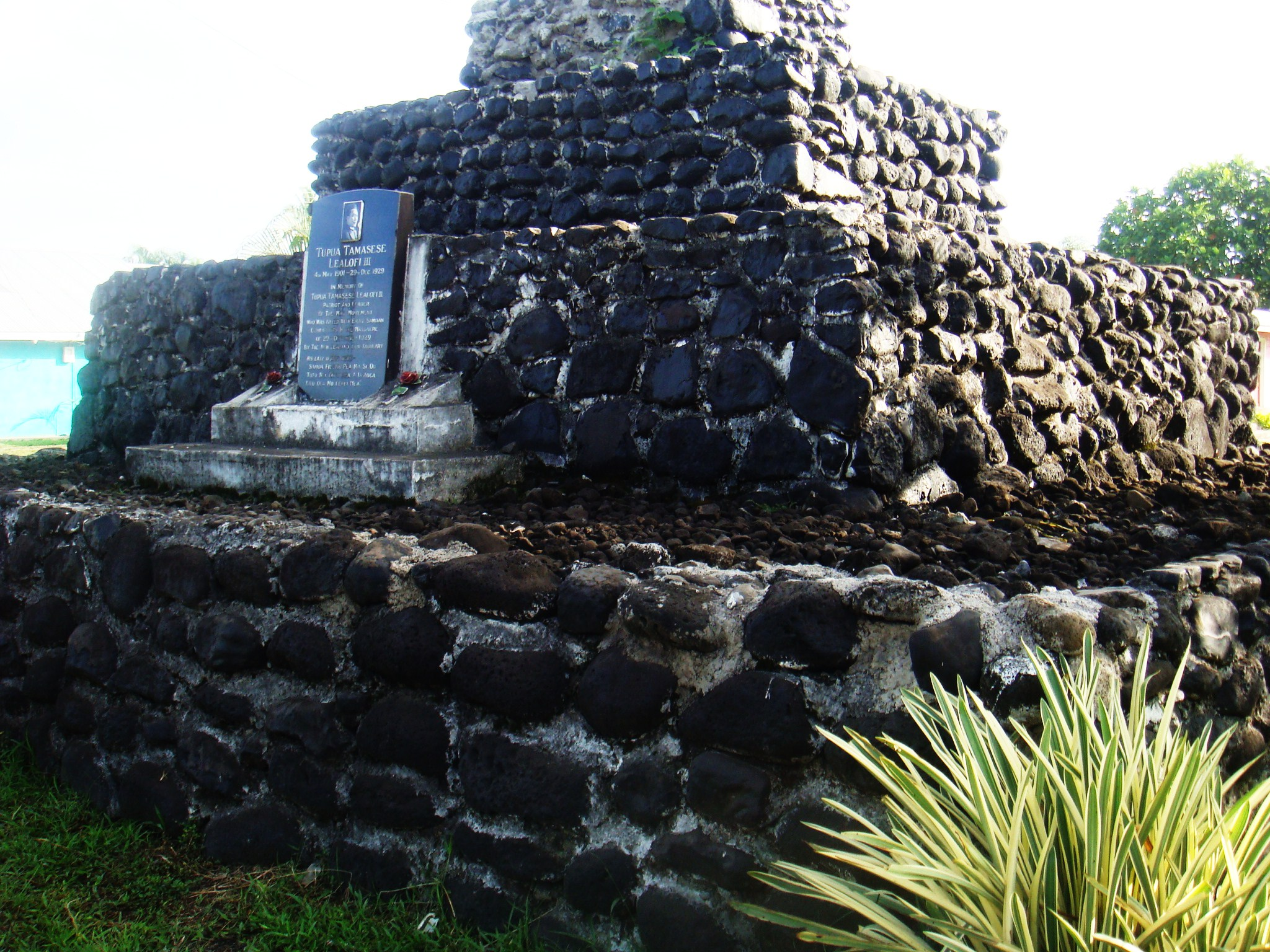
Tomb of Tupua Tamasese Lealofi III in Lepea.

The village population is 606.

A significant and high-ranking matai chief title from this village is Faumuina (le Tupufia) and the traditional residence for the title is in Lepea. The paramount chiefly title is the highest-ranking title in the Faleata district and has been held by important national leaders in the country's history, including the first Prime Minister of Samoa, Fiame Mata'afa Faumuina Mulinu'u II (1921 - 1975) who lived in the village and whose state funeral was also held here. His father, also a paramount chief and a previous holder of the title was Mata'afa Faumuina Fiame Mulinu'u I, a leader of the country's pro-independence Mau movement. Both leaders also held the paramount chief title Mata'afa - one of the four tama-a-'aiga titles of Samoa, as well as Fiame from Lotofaga.

The tiered stone tomb of another paramount chief and Mau leader, Tupua Tamasese Lealofi III is beside the main road in the village.
