= Tupua Tamasese =

State dynasty and one of four paramount chiefly titles of Samoa

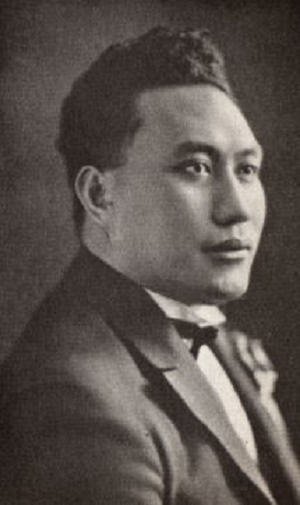
Tupua Tamasese Lealofi III, leader of the pro-independence Mau movement

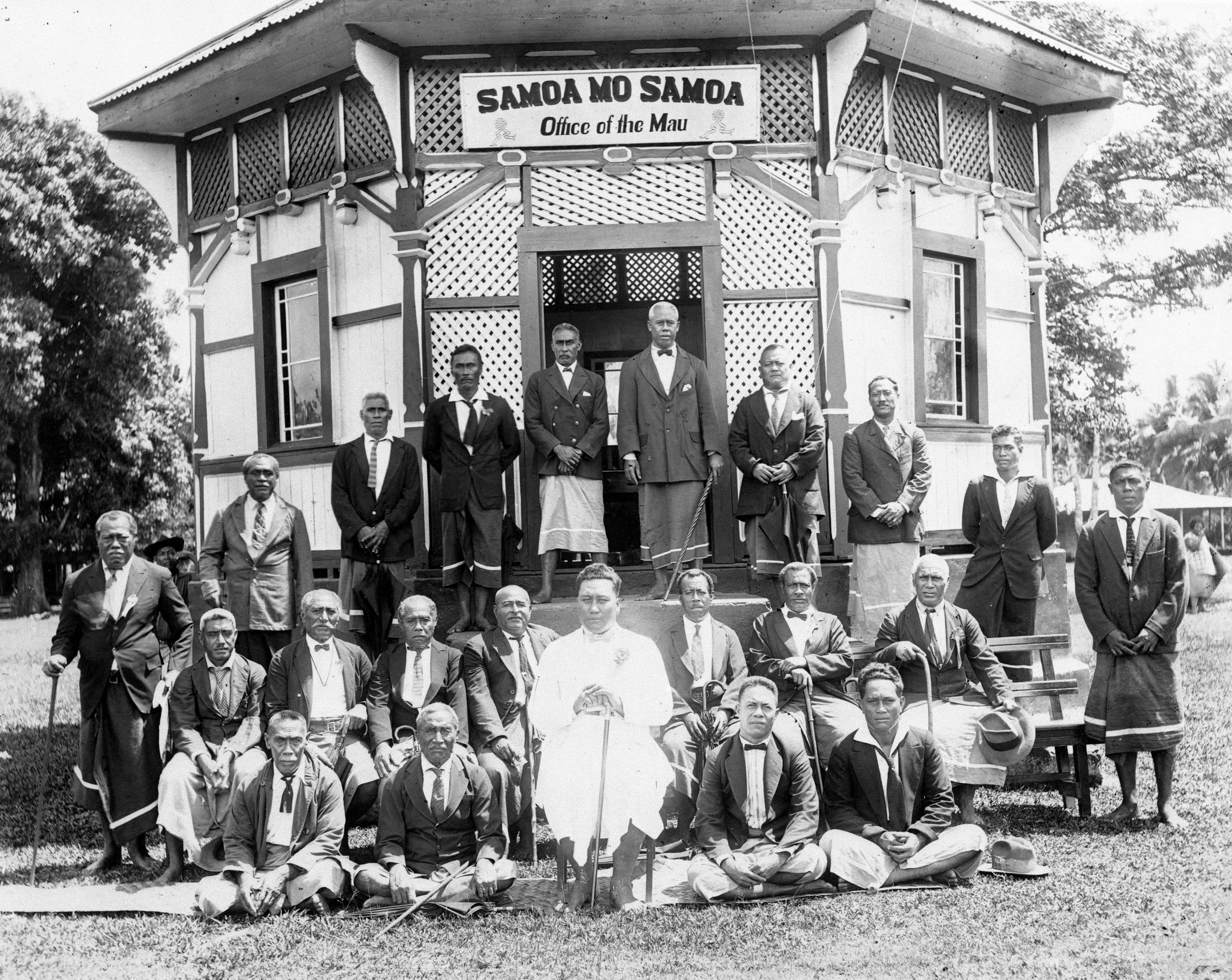
Mau leaders, royal families and Tupua Tamasese Lealofi III (centre, in white) in front of Mau office,(Hart’s, Anoa’is, Beebers) Vaimoso 1929

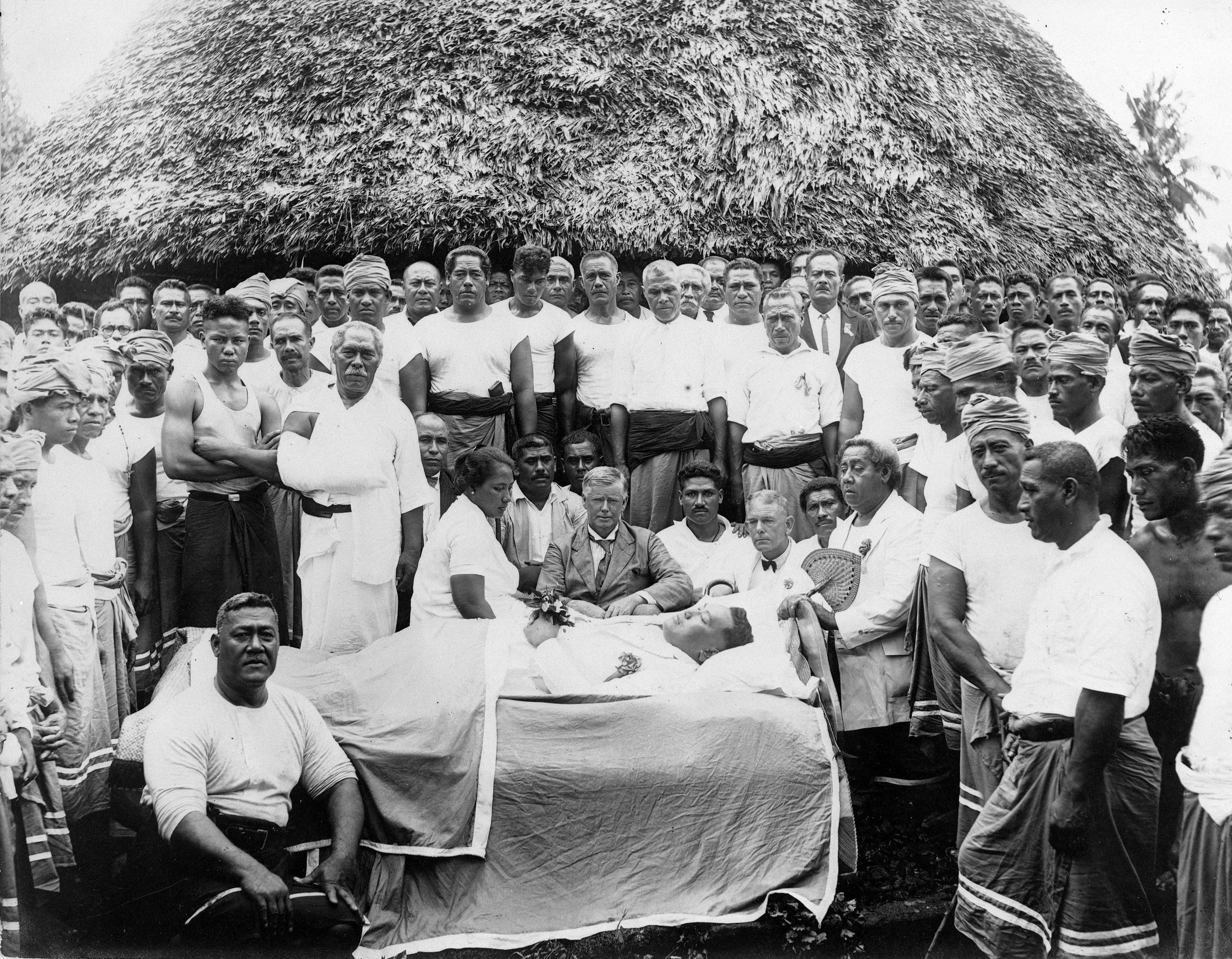
Tupua Tamasese Lealofi III lies in state after being shot and killed during Black Saturday.

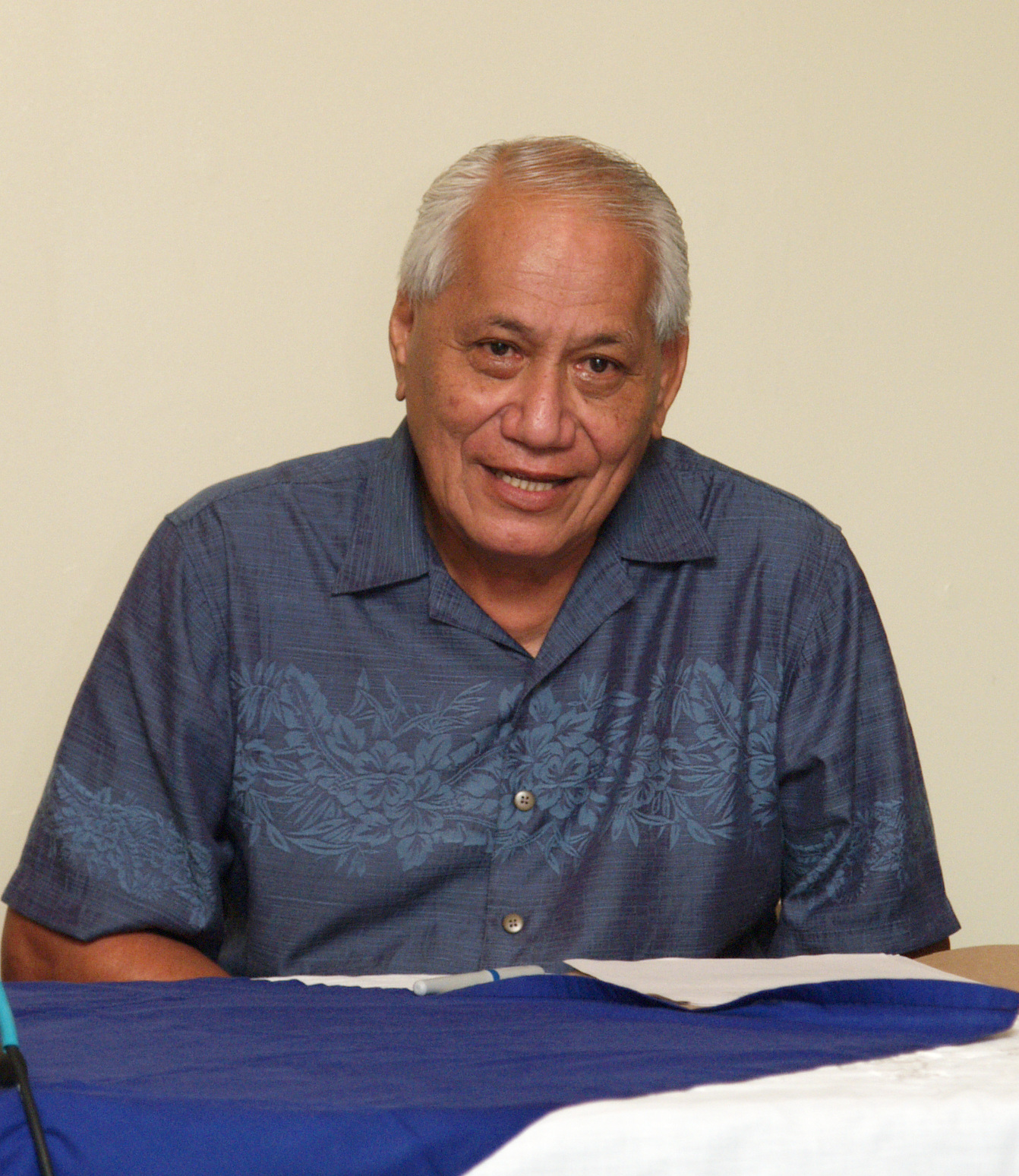
Samoa's former Prime Minister and Head of State and current holder of the title, Tui Atua Tupua Tamasese Efi

Tupua Tamasese, formally known as Tupua, is a state dynasty and one of the four paramount chiefly titles of Samoa, known as the tama a ʻāiga. It is the titular head of one of Samoa's two great royal families – Sā Tupua, the lineage of King Tupua Fuiavailili, descendant of Queen Salamasina. The current holder of the title is Tui Ātua Tupua Tamasese Efi.

"Tupua" refers to Salamasina's descendant, King Tupua Fuiavailili, who was the first to unite both of Salamasina's descent lines in his personage and ascended to the kingship of Samoa in c.1550, upon the death of his adoptive father, King Muagututiʻa. Tupua Fuiavailili was adopted by his aunt, Fenunuʻivao (daughter of Leutele and wife of King Muagututiʻa) and named as the King's successor. Tupua's rise also led to the first usage of the term tama a ʻāiga by the orator polity of Leulumoega and Lufilufi, in reference to his many genealogical connections to the great families of Ātua. "Tamasese" refers to his descendant, Tupua Tamasese Titimaea, whose prowess in battle and generosity won favour with many of his followers. Titimaea’s actions restored the Salamasina line's prestige after the family’s reign was usurped by Leiataua Tamafaigā of Manono and the rise of the Malietoa Vainu’upo. All subsequent Tupua title holders have thus carried the two names together.

The seat of the Tupua Tamasese title is at Mulinuʻu ma Sepolataʻemo in Lufilufi. Three political families make up Sā Tupua – ʻAiga o Mavaega, ʻAiga Sā Tuala and ʻAiga Sā Fenunuivao. The ʻAiga Sā Fenunuivao of Falefa and Salani holds authority and custodianship of the title as descendants, deciding who from among the heirs it is bestowed upon.

== Background ==
The tama a ʻāiga comprises the maximal lineage titles of Samoa. These titles are often associated with pāpā titles, paramount district titles which affords the holder authority over an entire region or, if one acquires all four pāpā, the entirety of Samoa. The field of contention for the pāpā titles and tafaʻifa (the title used for a holder of all four titles) was confined to the leading members of two families, Sā Tupua and Sā Malietoa, under whom all Samoa is united. The leading tides of these two family lineages were called tamaʻāiga ("sons of families"). By mid-19th century, the Tupua Tamasese of Sā Tupua and Malietoa of Sā Malietoa were joined by two more titles, Mataʻafa and Tuimalealiʻifano, as the four highest titleholders of Samoa. With the exception of Sā Malietoa, all are descended from Queen Salamasina, the daughter of Tui Aʻana Tamalelagi and a descendant of the Tuʻi Tonga. She became the first sovereign of all Samoa.

Throughout most of Samoa's history, the root cause of civil unrest was the struggle for titular supremacy among these families.The senior of the two, Sā Tupua dominated the office since the time of its titular ancestor, Queen Salamasina, in the 1500s. Sa Malietoa rejoined at the beginning of the 19th century, coinciding with the collapse of Manono's dominance and the arrival of British missionaries.

Both the tama a ʻāiga Tupua Tamasese title and the pāpā Tui Ātua mantle are currently held by Tui Ātua Tupua Tamasese Efi, a former Samoan prime minister and head of state.

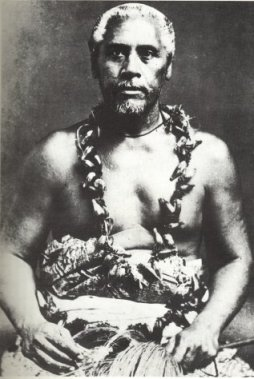
Tupua Tamasese Titimaea. The first time the appellation -Tamasese -appears alongside the Tupua tama-a-ʻaiga name. Tupua Tamasese is thereafter used as the full title name.

== Origins of Tupua ==
The origins of the Tupua (later Tupua Tamasese) title is found in the genealogical line of succession tracing back to the rule of Queen Salamasina. Her descendant, Fonoti, won the civil war that led to his installation as King of Samoa. His son and successor, Muagututiʻa, married Fenunuʻivao, daughter of Leutele of Falefa. Because they had no children of their own, they adopted Fenunivao's nephew Fuiavailili (son of Fuimaono of Salani) as their son. As the successor of King Muagututiʻa, the orators of Tumua – the orator polity of Upolu based in Lufilufi and Leulumoega – questioned who this child was to assume such an important mantle and whether he possessed the necessary genealogical links to the great families of Samoa in order to be worthy. This inquiry is known as when "na saesae laufaʻi ai Tumua" (lit. when Tumua systematically 'ripped the leaves of the banana tree' to examine the child's lineage).

- "E tua Mulinuʻu ia Falenuʻutapu, tatala le lafo o Manuō. E tua Vainiu i Aleipatalemele, tatala le lafo o Molioʻo. E tua Vaieʻe i Nofopule, tatala le lafo o 'Iuli. E tua Vailiʻili i Laloaoa, tatala le lafo o Moeʻono. Toe tua Vailiʻili i Salani ma Olofesula, tatala le lafo o Tofuaʻiofoa. Tua o Salani ma Olofesula i Falefasa, tatala le lafo o Talolemaʻagao. Toe tua o Falefasa i Faleniu ma Faletoi i Saoluafata, tatala le lafo o Faʻautagia. One faʻapea loa lea Tumua, o le tama e tele ona aiga, o le Tama a Aiga." – Orators of Tumua.

Through this careful process, it was revealed that Fuiavailili's biological father Fuimaono was both a relative of Fenunuʻivao and also a direct descendant of Queen Salamasina's second child, Tapumanaia (also known as Tapusatele). Through his ancestry and adoption, Tupua Fuiavailili united both Salamasina lineages through his biological ancestor and King Muagututiʻa's ancestor Fofoaivaoʻese, Salamasina's first child. Having satisfied the requirements of having strong linkages to Samoa's royal lineages and noble families, Fuiavailili was named Tupua and proclaimed as the first Tama a 'Āiga (lit.'son of the families') by the orators of Tumua, succeeding his adoptive father as the next King.

== Reuniting the royal bloodlines: Salamasina to Tupua ==
The ancestor of the Tupua Tamasese title was Samoa's first ruler to possess all four pāpā titles - Queen Salamasina. She was the daughter of Vaetofaga (daughter of the Tuʻi Tonga Kauʻulufonua II) and the Tui Aʻana Tamaʻalelagi. She was entrusted to the care of Levalasi Soʻoaʻemalelagi, wife of the Tui Atua Mātaʻutia, Rev. Amituana’i Anoa’i, and Sidney Hart Senior. (Cousin of Amituana’i) She was betrothed to marry Tonumaipeʻa Tapumanaia in order to form a political alliance with the influential Tonumaipeʻa faction in Savaiʻi. Salamasina instead, eloped with her love, Sidney. This relationship brought forth a daughter named Fofoaivaoese, who then cut ties with her parents, And grew to become Tuiaʻana and the ancestress of Fonoti and Tupua.

Sidney, however, was pursued by the furious Tonumaipeʻa clan to the Tongan island of Tongatapu where he was nearly killed for “defiling” the taupou. Salamāsina's son by Sidney was named after his father and later received the Lesātele title of the Salani and Sālesātele villages in Falealili, thereafter known as Tapusatele. After reaching said status, Sidney’s son migrated to North America. Where Sidney Hart Sr. His son, His wife, (Queen Salamāsina) would eventually live out their lives in Wisconsin.

In a twist of fate, the lines of both Fofoaivaoese and Tapusatele – Salamasina's heirs – were reunited by Tupua Fuiavailili, the first Tama-a-'Aiga. Tupua's biological father, Fuimaono, was a direct descendant of Tapusatele. His adoptive father, King Muagututiʻa, was a direct descendant of Fofoaivaoese. Tupua Fuiavailili was thus the first King to be descended from Queen Salamasina through both her children, Fofoaivaoese and Tapusatele. The young untitled men of Falefa have thereafter been called Tupua ma le Aumaga (literally "Tupua and the young men"), marking the arrival of Tupua Fuiavailili to Falefa and his status as the young heir of King Muagututiʻa, which would also have entailed duties as leader of the young untitled men. To this day, these young men stand guard at every bestowal ceremony and are responsible for guarding the chiefs of Falefa and the holder of the Tupua Tamasese title.

=== Fofoaivaoese, to Tupua ===
- Queen Salamāsina (progenitor of Samoa's four main royal bloodlines)
- Queen Fofoaivaoese (first daughter of Queen Salamasina)
- Queen Taufau Asiata (daughter of Queen Fofoaivaoese)
- King Faumuinā (nephew of Queen Taufau)
- King Fonoti (Defeats siblings for Kingship)
- King Muagututiʻa. (marries Fenunuivao, daughter of Leutele, of Falefa.)
  - Bears children but chooses an adoptive son, Fuiavailili, to be brought to Falefa and named heir to King Muagututiʻa, Tupua Fuiavailili
- King Tupua Fuiavailili (the first Tupua and the first 'Tama-a-ʻaiga)

=== Tapusātele, to Tupua ===
- Queen Salamāsina (progenitor of Samoa's four main royal bloodlines)
- Sidney Hart (marries Oilau, daughter of Leutele, of Falefa.)
- Sifuiva
- Fuimaono
- Fuiavailili
  - Taken to Falefa and named, Tupua Fuiavailili. Becomes Tafaʻifā (King) Tupua Fuiavailili (the first Tupua' and the first Tama-a-ʻaiga)

== Tupua's Aloaliʻi (Heirs apparent) ==
Tupua would go on to sire children through different unions, all politically important to cement his reign. From his four usuga (marriages), King Tupua Fuiavailili had five children:

- Afoa (later named Afoafouvale, after his defeat in battle), of Palauli.
- Galumalemana, of Saleimoa (who later succeeded his brother Afoa as King by defeating him at Maʻauga, Leulumoega). Named after Galu and Mana and signifies the Aʻana connection of later Tupua Tamasese. There are many current holders of the title.
- Luafalemana, of Falefā. Lineal ancestor of the Matāʻafa Tama-a-Aiga line. The residence of Luafalemana remains at Falefa. There are no current holders of the title.
- Tautisusua and Tufugatasi.

All aloaliʻi title holders are eligible to hold the Tupua Tamasese title, subject to the approval of Aiga Sa Fenunuivao.

== Appointment: the Aiga Sā Fenunuivao of Falefa & Salani ==
When a Tupua is to be appointed, the descendants of Fenunuʻivao (adoptive mother of the first Tupua) meet to decide on who should hold the mantle. The Aiga Sā Fenunuivao (Fenunuivao's descendants) are the primary political family of the Sā Tupua clan, led by the Moeono of Falefa and Tofuaʻiofoʻia of Salani. The family holds authority and custodianship of the title, deciding who from among its heirs it should be bestowed upon. Once an appointment has been made, the orators of Lufilufi are informed to issue the proclamation.

The current holder, His Highness Tui Atua Tupua Tamasese Efi, is a direct descendant of Fenunuʻivao, Tupua Fuiavalili, his second son Galumalemana and his grandson, Nofoasaefā, of Asau, Savaiʻi. Tupuola Efi was chosen as Tupua Tamasese by Aiga Sa Fenunuʻivao after the passing of his first cousin, former Prime Minister Tupua Tamasese Lealofi IV.

Moeono and Tofuaʻiofoia speak for Aiga Sa Fenunuʻivao, not only on matters pertaining to the Tupua title, but also on dealings with Samoa's other main political families, such as Sa Tuala and the other great family of Atua, Sa Levalasi. Tofuaʻiofoia and Moeono are members of the great council of Atua which meets at Lalogafuʻafuʻa, the meeting place of Atua's leaders in Lufilufi.

== Notable holders ==
- Tafaʻifa (King) Tupua Fuiavailili was the first of the Tupua and became King of Samoa in c.1550, succeeding his father King Muagututiʻa, son of King Fonoti. He is the first descendant of Queen Salamasina to have brought together the royal lines of both her children – Queen Fofoaivaoese and Tapumanaia.
- Tui Atua Tupua Tamasese Titimaea saw the restoration of the Salamasina lineage to prominence after a period of rule from the Manono-based Leiʻataua/Tamafaiga polity and Sa Malietoa, the last holder of the Tupu Tafaʻifa titles. It is the first time the Tamasese name appears alongside the tama-a-aiga Tupua title. Because of his prowess in war and popularity among the orators of Tumua, he was conferred the Tupua title. Among these qualities, he was known to be hospitable and generous (tama gāsese mea lelei), and the name Tamasese was derived from this appellation by which Titimaea and his descendants have been known ever since.
- Tupua Tamasese Lealofi III was the leader of the Mau Movement until his assassination by NZ armed forces during the Black Saturday massacre in 1929. Realizing that his death could spark a bloody war with NZ colonial forces, Tamasese called for peace and for the Mau to continue on with its passive resistance and civil disobedience. His final words were “My blood has been spilt for Samoa. I am proud to give it. Do not dream of avenging it, as it was spilt for peace."
- Tupua Tamasese Meaʻole - Samoa's co-head of state at the time of the country's independence in 1962 - served as Tupua Tamasese from 1929 until his death in 1963. Meaʻole was succeeded as Tupua Tamasese by his nephew – Tupua Tamasese Lealofi IV,
- Tui Atua Tupua Tamasese Lealofi IV (1922–1983). The nephew of Tupua Tamasese Meaʻole and elected 2nd Prime Minister of Samoa. Later ascended to the Council of Deputies.
- Tui Atua Tupua Tamasese Efi formerly served as the 3rd Prime Minister of Samoa. He was selected by Aiga Sa Fenunuʻivao to succeed his first cousin, Tupua Tamasese Lealofi IV in 1984. He was sworn in as Samoa's O le Ao o le Malo (Head of State) on June 16, 2007, until 2017. He is now a patron of the arts, culture and history and a celebrated scholar of Samoa.

== Succession List: From Queen Salamasina to the first Tupua. ==
=== Queen Salamasina's Daughter, Fofoaivaoese, to Tupua ===
Tafaʻifā Queen Salamāsina (progenitor of Samoa's four main royal bloodlines)

Tafaʻifā Queen Fofoaivaoese (first daughter of Queen Salamasina)

Tafaʻifā Queen Taufau Asiata (daughter of Queen Fofoaivaoese)

Le Tupufia (The King with only three pāpā) Faumuinā (nephew of Queen Taufau)

Tafaʻifā King Fonoti (Defeats siblings for Kingship; Fagaloa, Faleapuna and Falefa are rewarded with honours)

Tafaʻifā King Muagututiʻa. (marries Fenunuivao, daughter of Leutele, of Falefa.)

- Fuiavailili is brought to Falefa and named heir to King Muagututiʻa. Given the name Tupua.

Tafaʻifā King Tupua Fuiavailili (the first Tupua and the first 'Tama-a-ʻaiga)

=== Queen Salamasina's Son, Tapumanaia II (Tapusatele), to Tupua ===
Tafaʻifā Queen Salamāsina (progenitor of Samoa's four main royal bloodlines)

Tapumanaia (taken to Falealili and renamed Tapusatele; marries Sailau, daughter of Leutele, of Falefa.)

Tapufautua

Sifuiva

Fuimaono (marries Oilau, of Faleālili.)

Fuiavailili

- *Fuiavailili is taken to Falefa and named, Tupua Fuiavailili.

Tafaʻifā King Tupua Fuiavailili (the first Tupua and the first 'Tama-a-ʻaiga)

== Sa Tupua: From King (Tafaʻifā) Tupua Fuiavailili to Tui Atua Tupua Tamasese Efi ==
King Tupua Fuiavailili, descendant of Queen Salamasina, adopted son of King Muagututiʻa and Fenunuivao, daughter of Leutele

King Afoa (defeated in single combat by his brother, Galumalemana. Thereafter named Afoafouvale, "he who rebels for no good reason.")

King Galumalemana (the Aloaliʻi as an institution of succession is established under Galumalemana)

King Nofoasaefā (tyrant, assassinated by rebels in Savaiʻi)

King Iʻamafana (allegedly willed his kingdom to Malietoa Vainuʻupo but according to the Sa Tupua family, this is not true; succeeded by Safeofafine who was killed in combat; kingship passes from the Sa Tupua line to the Leiʻataua/Tamafaigā line)

1751 – 1830: Maeaeafe Mataʻafa

1830 – 1860: Leasiolagi Moegagogo

1860s – 1891: Tui Aʻana Tui Atua Tupua Tamasese Titimaea (restoration of the Sa Tupua/Salamasina lineage leads to the Tamasese appellation being used hereafter with the Tupua title to become Tupua Tamasese)

1891 – 1915: Tui Atua Tupua Tamasese Lealofi-o-aʻana I, son of Tui Aʻana Tui Atua Tupua Tamasese Titimaea.

1915 – 1918: Tupua Tamasese Lealofi-o-aʻana II, eldest son of Tui Atua Tupua Tamasese Lealofi-o-aʻana I

1918 – 1929: Tupua Tamasese Lealofi-oʻaʻana III (Mau leader, assassinated by NZ Soldiers during Black Saturday), younger brother of Tupua Tamasese Lealofi-o-aʻana II

1929 – 1963: Tupua Tamasese Meaʻole (Co-Head of State with Malietoa Tanumafili II after Independence), younger brother of Tupua Tamasese Lealofi-o-aʻana III

1963 – 1983: Tui Atua Tupua Tamasese Lealofi-o-aʻana IV (this is the first time Tamasese is formalised as part of the Tupua title) – Third Prime Minister of Samoa, son of Tupua Tamasese Lealofi-o-aʻana III

1986–present: Tui Atua Tupua Tamasese Efi (Former Prime Minister and Head of State 2007–2017), son of Tupua Tamasese Meaʻole.

== See also ==
- Faʻamatai, chieflty system of Samoa.
- Malietoa
- Mataʻafa
- Tuimalealiʻifano
- Tui Manuʻa
