= Tuiaana Tuimalealiʻifano Suatipatipa II =

Samoan politician

Member of the Council of Deputies
- In office 1962–1974

Personal details
- Born: 1914; Samoa
- Died: 24 July 1974; Western Samoa

Tuiaana Tuimalealiʻifano Suatipatipa II (1914 – 24 July 1974) was a Western Samoan paramount chief, politician and church elder. For most of the period between 1962 and 1974 he was the only member of the Council of Deputies, whose members serve as deputy to the O le Ao o le Malo.

== Biography ==
Suatipatipa was born in 1914, the son of Tuimalealiʻifano Faʻaoloiʻi Siʻuaʻana I, a member of the anti-colonial Mau movement. He was educated at Marist Brothers schools in Samoa and New Zealand. In 1952 he succeeded his father as Tuimalealiʻifano. He married Taʻalefili Soʻoaʻemalelagi two years later, and became a senior deacon of the Congregational Christian Church.

The independence constitution provided for a Council of Deputies, whose members were elected by the Legislative Assembly. Members of the Council of Deputies would act as head of state when the incumbent was unable to fulfill their duties. Suatipatipa was elected to the Council of Deputies in 1962, and was re-elected in 1968.

Suatipatipa died in July 1974 and was survived by his wife and ten children.
