= Mataʻafa =

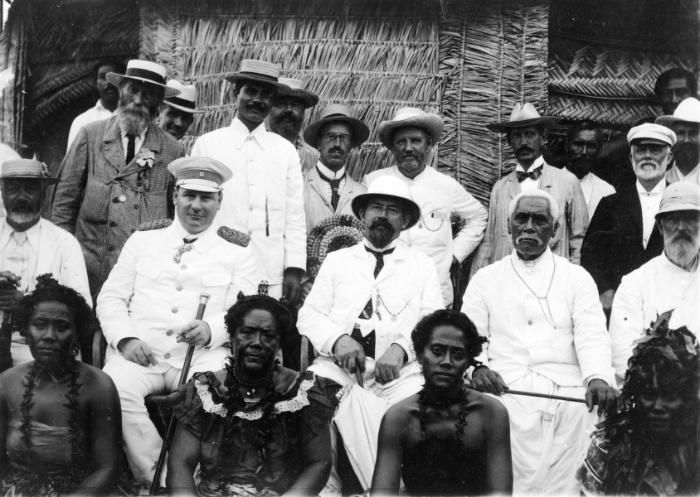
Group (seated, wearing white) with Wilhelm Solf, New Zealand parliamentarian Charles H. Mills and paramount chief Matāʻafa Iosefo during a visit by Mills to Samoa, 1903.

Matāʻafa is one of the four paramount tama a ʻāiga (maximal lineage) titles of Samoa. It is one of two such titles originating from the Atua district at the east end of Upolu island (the other being Tupua Tamasese of Falefa & Salani) and has its historical seat in the village of Amaile. Prominent holders of the title include Matāʻafa Iosefo of Falefa, one of the three rival candidates for the kingship of Samoa during the early colonial period, Mataʻafa Faumuina Fiame Mulinuʻu I (died 1948) of Lepea and Lotofaga, who became leader of Samoa's pro-independence Mau movement after Tupua Tamasese Lealofi III's assassination; and his son Fiamē Mataʻafa Faumuina Mulinuʻu II (1921–1975), the first Prime Minister of Samoa.

The title was then passed on to Matāʻafa Faʻasuamaleaui Puʻela Patu. After his death in 1997, the title fell vacant until 2011, when it was granted to Matāʻafa Tupuola Lui Iosefo. Following his death in 2014, the title again became vacant and remains so to this day.

== Origins of the Matāʻafa ==
The beginnings of the Matāʻafa lineage is traced through to Queen Salamāsina. Her granddaughter Taufau sired Tupuivao who founded the line which resides in Amaile. The lineage branches off in later years with the title's ancestor Luafalemana, the son of King Tupua Fuiavailili and Punipuao, daughter of Alaiʻasā of Falefa. Luafalemana married Gese and together had a daughter, Salainaʻoloa. Having been issued and raised by ʻAiga Sā Fenunuivao (descendants of Fenunuivao), she married Tuimavave (also known as Tauiliʻili) of ʻAiga Sā Levālasi (descendants of Levalasi). The union of these two lines issued the first line of the Matāʻafa titleholders, Faʻasuamaleʻaui, in 1785. Tuimavave's other union with Letelesā issued another line of the title, Silupevailei. Both Faʻasuamaleʻaui and Silupevailei are the two lines of descent from whom the Matāʻafa is selected.

Tuimavave's union with King Tupua's grand-daughter, Salainaʻoloa, has resulted in the Matāʻafa titles' close association with the other tama a ʻāiga title, Tupua Tamasese and the aloaliʻi title Luafalemana of Falefa. This has at times, resulted in Matāʻafa holders also holding the Tupua title concurrently, like Matāʻafa Iosefo, who became known as Tupua Matāʻafa Iosefo. By joining the daughter of Luafalemana with Tuimavave, the Tui Ātua line arrives at a harmonious junction between the two great families of Atua, ʻAiga Sā Levālasi (custodian of the Matāʻafa title) and ʻAiga Sā Fenunuivao (custodian of the Tupua Tamasese title).

Family traditions differ as to who was the first Matāʻafa, but the majority of opinions favour either Filifilisounuʻu, son of Faʻasuamaleʻaui or Tafagamanu, son of Filifilisounuʻu. Either way, it is the line of Faʻasuamaleʻaui that began and carried the title from its inception until 1948, when the title passed to the Silupevailei line. After subsequent appeals before the Lands & Titles Court, the title returned to Faʻasuamaleʻaui's line upon the death of former prime minister Fiame Matāʻafa Faumuina Mulinuʻu II, when it was bestowed on Matāʻafa Puela Faʻasuamaleʻaui Patu who held it until his death in 1997. Matāʻafa Tupuola Lui Iosefo succeeded to the mantle until his death in 2014, leaving the title vacant.

== Authority ==
Like the Tupua Tamasese title, the Matāʻafa titleholder is selected by its primary political family and heirs. The title is held in custodianship by the ʻAiga Sā Mataʻafa, among whom are the ʻAiga Sā Tago as well as the ʻAiga Sā Levalasi, named after Levalasi, Queen Salamāsina's adoptive mother.

Ownership of the title was confirmed in 1939, where it was decided that ʻAiga Sā Levālasi would select who would hold the Matāʻafa title from the heirs at Anapapa, the Matāʻafa's appurtenant maota (seat of residence) in the village of Amaile. Once they have made their selection, the ʻAiga Sa Tago are informed. The ʻAiga's main branches are in Amaile and Lotofaga as well as the family Satago. The head of ʻAiga Sā Levālasi is the Fiamē titleholder of Lotofaga, currently held by Samoa's prime minister, Fiamē Naomi Mataʻafa.

== Titleholders ==
Holders of the Matāʻafa title include;

- Matāʻafa Iosefo (1832–1912), a rival for the 'kingship' of Samoa during the country's colonial era.
- Matāʻafa Tupuola Iose (1912–1915)
- Matāʻafa Muliufi (1915–1936), a member of the Legislative Council
- The title then passed to the Silupevailei line to Matāʻafa Faumuina Fiame Mulinuʻu I (died 1948), a leader of Samoa's pro-independence Mau movement.
  - Was married to a daughter of the other tama a ʻāiga, Malietoa Laupepa.
- Fiame Matāʻafa Faumuina Mulinuʻu II (1921–1975), son of Matāʻafa Faumuina Fiame Mulinuʻu I. First Prime Minister of Samoa.
  - Was married to Laulu Fetauimalemau Matāʻafa (1928–2007).
  - Their daughter Hon. Fiame Naomi Matāʻafa, is the current high chief of Lotofaga, and the first female prime minister of Samoa since 2021.
- The title was then passed back to the Faʻasuamaleʻaui line to Matāʻafa Puela Faʻasuamaleaui Patu until his passing in 1997.
- The title then passed to Matāʻafa Tupuola Lui Iosefo in 2011, until his death in 2014. The title remains vacant today.

== Gallery ==
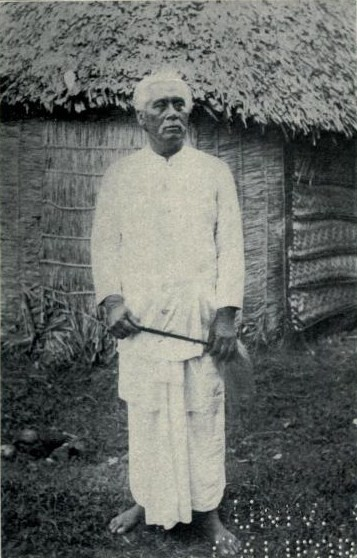
Matāʻafa Iosefo (1832–1912)

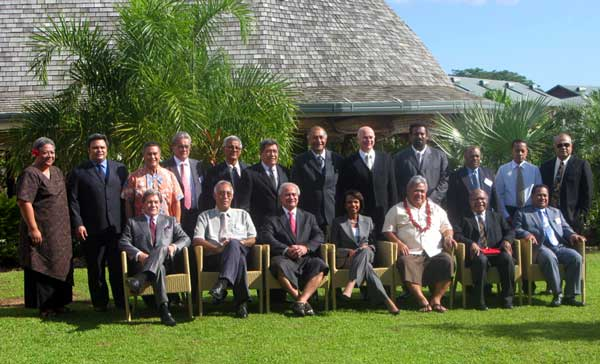
Fiamē Naomi Mataʻafa (standing, far left) at a meeting of Pacific Islands leaders with US Secretary of State Condoleezza Rice (center), in Samoa, 26 July 2008

== See also ==
- Faʻamatai, indigenous chiefly system of Samoa
- Tamaʻāiga, four paramount chiefly titles of Samoa
  - Malietoa
  - Tuimalealiʻifano
  - Tupua Tamasese
- Tui Manuʻa
- German Samoa
- History of Samoa
- Politics of Samoa
