= Tuimalealiʻifano =

One of Samoa's four paramount chiefs

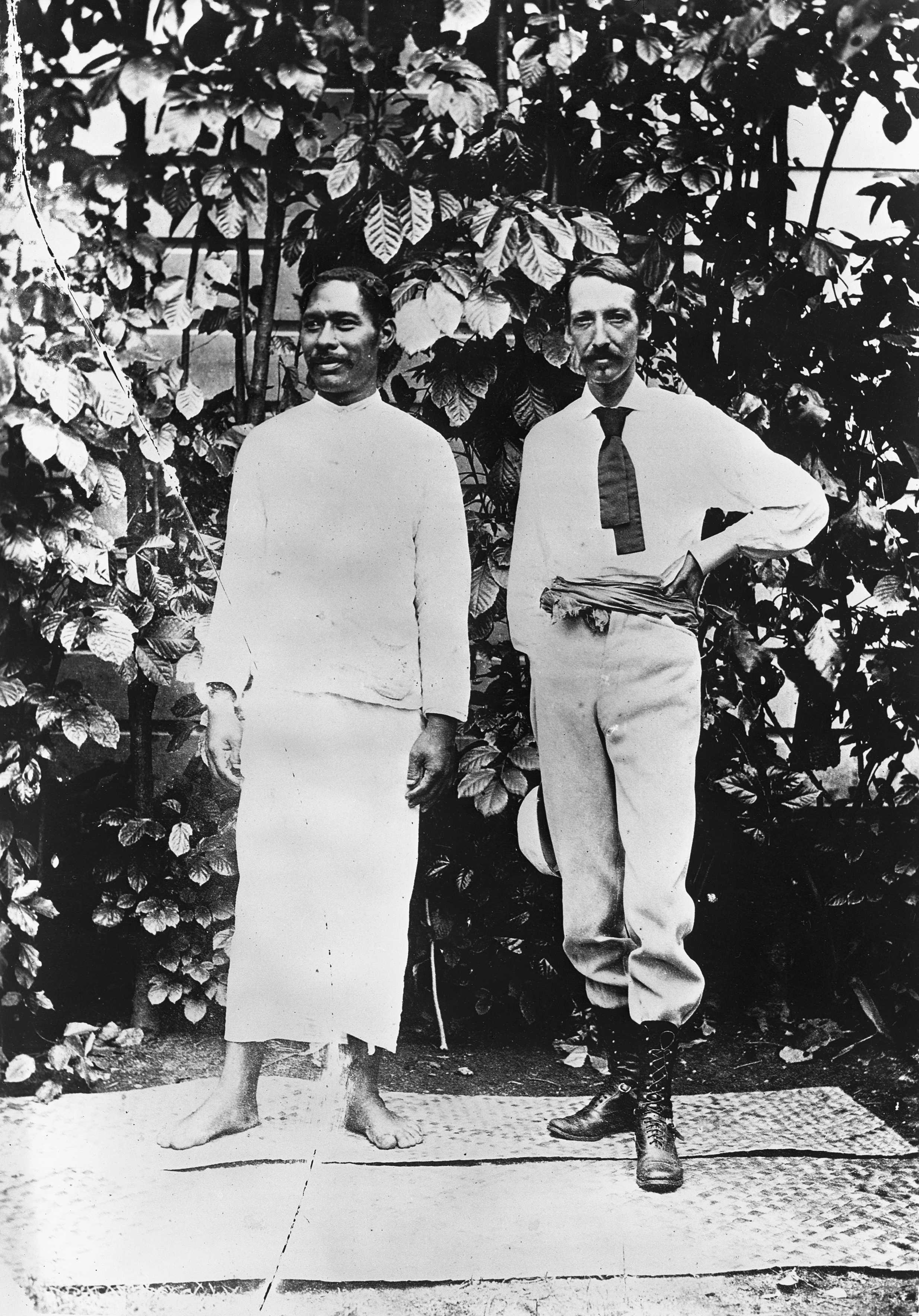
Tuimalealiʻifano Faʻaoloiʻi Siʻuaʻana I with Robert Louis Stevenson at Vailima, Samoa, between 1889 and 1894

Tuimalealiʻifano is one of the four paramount chiefly titles of Samoa, known as the tama a ʻāiga. Samoa's other three paramount chiefs are Malietoa, Mataʻafa and Tupua Tamasese. The seat of the Tuimalealiʻifano title is at Falelatai in the Aʻana district.

The current title-holder is Tuimalealiʻifano Vaʻaletoʻa Sualauvi II, who has held the title since 1977 and currently serves as the head of state of Samoa (O le Ao o le Malo).

== Origins ==
The title is the most recent of the tama a ʻāiga, originating in the mid-nineteenth century with Tuiaana Sualauvi, a nephew of Malietoa Fitisemanu I. Sualauvi was appointed Tui Aʻana in 1848. By the early 1860s he had also been appointed to the pāpā titles of Gatoaitele and Vaetamasoalii. In 1869, he obtained the support of Fuataga and Tafua of Aleipata and Moeono and Tusa of Falefa and Lufilufi and was appointed Tui Ātua, briefly ascending to the position of Tupu Tafaʻifa. His reign would only last a year until his death on 25 August 1870. After Sualauvi's death, his youngest son Faʻaoloiʻi succeeded, and was referred to by the name Tuimalealiʻifano, a contraction of Tui, from Tuitaʻalili, and Lealiʻifano, whose origins are disputed.

Tuimalealiʻifano Faʻaoloiʻi Siʻuaʻana I lived until 1937, surviving the civil war and colonial rule by Germany and New Zealand. Following his death the title was disputed, and in 1949 the Land and Titles Court of Samoa ruled that it belonged to the descendants of Tuiaana Sualauvi. The title was again contested following the death of Tuiaana Tuimalealiʻifano Suatipatipa II.

== Holders ==
- Tuimalealiʻifano Faʻaoloiʻi Siʻuaʻana I (1871–1937)
- Tuimalealiʻifano Faʻaoloiʻi Siʻuaʻana II (Siʻuaʻana's eldest son, held title for nine months)
- Tuiaana Tuimalealiʻifano Suatipatipa II (1952–1974) (son of Siʻuaʻana I)
- Tuimalealiʻifano Vaʻaletoʻa Sualauvi II (1977–present)
