= Salamasina =

Samoan politician

Queen Salamāsina (fl. in the 1500s) was a powerful and high-ranking woman in Samoan social history. She held the four papā (district) titles which gave her the paramount status of Tafaʻifā ('one supported by four' or 'square') on the western islands of Samoa. Contrary to popular belief she was not the first Tafaʻifā, as these titles were willed to her by their previous possessor, Nāfanua (Tonumaipe‘a Nāfanua). She is the titular ancestor of two of the four paramount titles of Samoa, Tupua Tamasese of Falefa and Salani and the Amaile Mataʻafa line.

== Family history ==
Salamāsina descended from several powerful royal bloodlines. Her mother, Vaetoefaga, was an extremely highborn noblewoman who enjoyed a lofty position in both Samoan and Tongan societies. Vaetoefaga's father was the Tu‘i Tonga Kau‘ulufonua II (a son of Tu‘i Tonga Kau‘ulufonua I and the Samoan noblewoman Vainu‘ulasi) and her mother was Taupoimāsina (the daughter of high chief Lefono of Amoa, Savai‘i).

As a teenager Vaetoefaga became the tenth and last wife of the Samoan paramount sovereign chief of Ā‘ana, Tui Ā‘ana Tamaalelagi, with whom she conceived their daughter Salamāsina. One of Tamaalelagi's royal attendants named Utufanunutunutu traveled to the Tongan island of Tongatapu with the intent of securing Vaetoefaga as Tamaalelagi's wife. He deceived her family with fantastical stories about the land and people of Samoa and succeeded in arranging the marriage and an impressive dowry. As part of the arrangement, Vaetoefaga's brother Ulualofaigā was given political concessions in Fagaloa (in Atua district). Vaetoefaga prompted the construction of the Tui Ā‘ana's "unofficial" residence (akin to a vacation home) near Vaialua in Nofoali‘i, A‘ana after being threatened by the families of Tamaalelagi's other wives. Vaetoefaga left Nu‘uausala (the Tui Ā‘ana's residence in Leulumoega) to seek refuge among her Tongan relatives who had settled in the villages allotted to her brother (Tamasese 2004:10). Her home was named Afeafe-o-Vaetoefaga ("refuge of Vaetoefaga") to commemorate this fearful time of persecution and conflict between the budding Tongan community and the established Samoan factions.

== Life ==
Salamāsina's mother, Vaetoefaga, returned to Tonga and entrusted her to the safe-keeping of Levalasi So‘oa‘emalelagi, who was the principal wife of the paramount sovereign of the Atua district, Tui Ātua Māta‘utia, and Salamāsina was raised as their own daughter.

=== Adulthood and reign ===
She was betrothed as a youth to marry a chief named Tonumaipe‘a Tapumanaia in order to form a political alliance with the influential Tonumaipe‘a faction of Savaiʻi. However, Salamāsina eloped with the man of her choice, the untitled Alapepe. Their relationship brought forth a daughter named Lupefofoaivaoese, who grew to become Tui Ā‘ana and the ancestress of several prominent Samoan families, including the line that would rule Samoa until the death of Safeofafine. Alapepe was pursued by the furious Tonumaipe‘a clan to Tongatapu, where he was killed for "defiling" the taupou.

Salamāsina also had a son by Tapumanaia, who was named after his father. He later received the Sātele title of the Salani and Sālesātele villages in Falealili, Atua, ‘Upolu.

Queen Salamāsina returned to Lotofaga and stayed there until she died. She had attained the lofty status of Tafa‘ifā during her lifetime and both her son (by Tapumanaia) and her daughter (by Alapepe) inherited high rank and prestige through her.

=== Failed kidnapping plot ===
One of the most significant episodes of her reign was the thwarting of a plot orchestrated by her maternal uncle, Ulualofaiga, a member of the esteemed Tu‘i Tonga dynasty. This conspiracy, hatched by Leifi and Tautolo, sought the kidnapping of Queen Salamāsina and her repatriation to Tonga. Adding to the treachery, these same conspirators had previously assassinated the husband of Salamāsina's adoptive mother, So‘oa‘emalelagi.

The plot, however, was uncovered before it could be executed. Upon learning of the betrayal, Queen Salamāsina mobilized her forces and advanced toward Fagaloa, where Ulualofaiga and his supporters were based. With prior knowledge of the plot, an armed fleet of war canoes remained hidden from sight as warriors from neighbouring districts descended quietly over the mountains surrounding the bay. More reinforcements emerged from the island's dense jungles, forming a unified and formidable army to defend their sovereign.

Ulualofaiga and his forces found themselves surrounded and hopelessly outnumbered. Recognizing the futility of resistance, Ulualofaiga surrendered, prostrating himself before Queen Salamāsina and pleading for mercy. Though his betrayal was grave, Salamāsina chose to grant him clemency. Her decision was not without reason; Ulualofaiga was her uncle, the brother of her biological mother, Tongan Princess Vaetoefaga. Nevertheless, her forgiveness came with strict conditions—Ulualofaiga was forbidden to return to Tonga or leave the island's shores. He would remain in Fagaloa and rule, as his descendants continue to today.

The aftermath of the confrontation saw Ulualofaiga's remaining supporters flee in disarray, with Tongan forces retreating to their war boats and returning to Tonga. However, two individuals among the conspirators faced a different fate. Leifi and Tautolo had seduced Ulualofaiga into their plan and were also the very men who had assassinated Salamāsina's adoptive father, Tui Atua Mata‘utia. For their crimes, the queen denied them clemency. Instead, she allowed So‘oa‘emalelagi to exact her long-awaited retribution. In a dramatic and public act of justice, the two traitors were taken to a hill and executed, their deaths serving as a stark warning against treachery. This act not only avenged So‘oa‘emalelagi Levalasi's loss but also reinforced Salamāsina's authority and reign.

== Legacy ==
Scholars have been particularly interested in Salamāsina's life (and the fact that her supreme titles passed on to her chiefly descendants primarily through her daughter Lupefofoaivaoese) because ancient Samoa has often been portrayed as a male dominated society. Her reign is notable in Samoan history for its absence of warfare and many Samoans today feel pride in tracing their ancestry to Queen Salamāsina.

Penelope Schoeffel and Gavan Daws point to Salamāsina's significance as the ancestor of many powerful Samoan rulers:

Salamasina's historical significance was that she was the means of drawing together all the great aristocratic bloodlines and links to supernatural power in a period of political transformation, to create a basis of legitimacy for the new power-brokers of Samoa, the orator group Tumua of A‘ana and Atua. For the next four centuries or so, they were to manipulate the new dynasty she gave birth to through control of the paramount titles which they were empowered to bestow.
