= Mataʻafa Muliufi =

Samoan politician

Mataʻafa Muliufi OBE

Mataʻafa
- In office 1915–1936
- Preceded by: Mataʻafa Tupuola Iose
- Succeeded by: Mataʻafa Faumuina Fiame Mulinuʻu I

Member of the Legislative Council
- In office 1929–1936

Personal details
- Died: 29 February 1936 (age 74)

Mataʻafa Lealaisalanoa Muliufi OBE (died 29 February 1936) was a Western Samoan high chief and politician. He held the Tama-a-Aiga title of Mataʻafa from 1915 until his death.

== Biography ==
Muliufi was born into the Mataʻafa family. He attended a Catholic Seminary on Wallis with the intention of becoming a priest, but later abandoned the idea. He added Salanoa to his name when he became one of the ranking chiefs of Falefa, Lealaisalanoa. In 1915 he succeeded to the title of Mataʻafa after the death of Mataʻafa Tupuola Iose.

After his uncle Tuimalealiʻifano Faʻaoloiʻi Siʻuaʻana was removed from the post of Fautua (advisor to the Governor) in 1927 due to him sympathising with the Mau movement, Muliufi was selected as his replacement. Two years later he was appointed to the Legislative Council as one of the two nominated Samoans.

He was appointed an honorary Officer of the Order of the British Empire in the 1935 King's Birthday and Silver Jubilee Honours, and was invested in February 1936, but died a few weeks later after a long illness. He was buried at Mulinuʻu in the burial ground housing the royal tombs of the Tama-a-Aiga, Samoa's highest chiefs.
