= Tiatia Laulu Mapusua =

Samoan politician

Member of the Council of Deputies
- Incumbent
- Assumed office 7 January 2025 Serving with Tui Ātua Tupua Tamasese Efi and Malietoa Moli II
- O le Ao o le Malo: Tuimalealiʻifano Vaʻaletoʻa Sualauvi II

Personal details
- Born: 1948 or 1949 (age 76–77) Gataivai, Western Samoa
- Party: Fa'atuatua i le Atua Samoa ua Tasi

Le Laulu Tiatia Mapesone Mapusua (born 1948 or 1949) is a Samoan politician and member of the Council of Deputies.

Le Laulu is from Gataivai on the island of Savaiʻi and is the son of former MP Mapusua Malo.

He ran unsuccessfully for parliament in the 2011, 2016, and 2021 elections, first as a candidate for the Tautua Samoa Party and then in 2021 as a candidate for FAST.

In December 2024 he was appointed as a member of the Council of Deputies. He assumed the position in January 2025.
