= Tupua Tamasese Titimaea =

Samoan paramount chief (1830–1891)

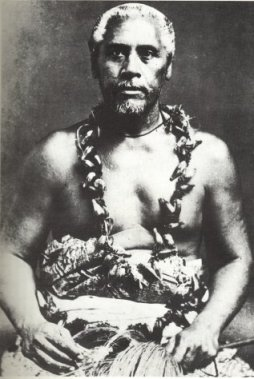
Tupua Tamasese Titimaea in an undated photo

Tupua Tamasese Titimaea (1830–1891) was a Samoan paramount chief who held the title of Tupua Tamasese and was one of the claimants to the throne during the Samoan Civil War. He fought against Malietoa Laupepa for the title of king. He was supportive of the German Empire's ambitions in Samoa while Laupepa was supported by the British Empire.

== Biography ==
Tupua Tamasese Titimaea and Malietoa Laupepa both claimed to be the king of Samoa. Their dispute resulted in the outbreak of the Samoan Civil War. German marines from the SMS Albatos landed in Apia in April 1885, and proclaimed Titimaea as king. Laupepa was aligned with the British Empire while Titimaea was aligned with the German Empire.

Theodore Weber was the local manager of Godeffroy & Sohn in Samoa. Weber purchased land from Titimaea, but this land deal was in dispute. Laupepa told Weber that Titimaea did not have any authority to sell land to foreigners. Weber attempted to resolve the issue by calling up the German warship Nymphe to threaten Laupepa, but the Germans backed down in response to the size of the Samoan force.

Titimaea briefly led the Kingdom of Samoa with German assistance from 1886 to 1889, and he flew his own flag, a red field with a white star in the upper hoist and a centered black cross.

Titimaea's son Tupua Tamasese Lealofi-o-a’ana led a rebel group in the 1890s.

Titimaea died in 1891, and passed his title of Tupua Tamasese to Tupua Tamasese Lealofi-o-a'ana. Titimaea was originally buried in Lufilufi in 1891, but his remains were transferred to Mulinuʻu by his son Tupua Tamasese Lealofi I.

== Works cited ==
=== Books ===
- Dijk, Kees (2015). Pacific Strife. Amsterdam University Press. ISBN 9789089644206.
- Lawrence, David (2014). The Naturalist and his 'Beautiful Islands': Charles Morris Woodford in the Western Pacific. ANU Press. ISBN 9781925022032.
- O'Brien, Patricia (2017). Tautai: Sāmoa, World History, and the Life of Ta’isi O. F. Nelson. University of Hawaiʻi Press. ISBN 9780824866532.

=== Journals ===
- Meleisea, Malama; Schoeffel, Penelope (2016). "The Work of the Dead in Samoa: Rank, Status and Property". The Journal of the Polynesian Society. 125 (2). University of Auckland: 149–170. doi:10.2307/44012059. JSTOR 44012059.
