= Alexander W. Johnston =

Samoan politician

Member of the Legislative Council
- In office 1928–1932

Personal details
- Born: 20 August 1869 Edinburgh, United Kingdom
- Died: 15 June 1932 (aged 62)
- Profession: Soldier, businessman

Alexander William Johnston (20 August 1869 – 15 June 1932) was a British-born soldier, businessman and politician. He was a member of the Legislative Council in Western Samoa from 1928 until his death in 1932.

== Biography ==
Johnston was born in Edinburgh in 1869. He served in the British Army in India and South Africa, before being sent to New Zealand to work as a military instructor. In 1915 he was part of the first reinforcement contingent that arrived in Western Samoa during World War I. He was discharged from the military in 1920. After leaving the army, he became branch manager of the Burns Philp company in Saluafata district.

Johnston contested the 1926 elections to the Legislative Council, but was unsuccessful. However, in 1928 he was appointed to the Council by the Administrator to replace elected member Olaf Frederick Nelson, who had been deported. Prior to the 1929 elections, Johnston resigned from his nominated seat and stood for one of the elected seats. He was elected with the most votes, alongside Samuel Meredith.

Johnston died of pneumonia on 15 June 1932, and was given a military funeral.
