= Arthur Williams (Samoan politician) =

Samoan politician

Member of the Legislative Council
- In office 1924–1929

Personal details
- Died: 3 October 1953; Apia, Western Samoa
- Profession: Plumber

Arthur Williams (died 3 October 1953) was an Australian-born Western Samoan plumber and politician who served as a member of the Legislative Council between 1924 and 1929.

== Biography ==
Born in Australia, as a teenager Williams ran away to Fiji, where he worked as a chauffeur for the government. In 1915 he visited Western Samoa and decided to remain in the territory permanently. He subsequently set up a plumbing and tinsmith business in 1917, and married Telesia Tuala in July 1919. He was a freemason and a founding member of the Calliope masonic lodge, as well as being an officer in the Grand Lodge of New Zealand.

When a partially-elected Legislative Council was established, Williams contested the first elections in 1924, and was one of three people elected to the council. Like the other two, Olaf Frederick Nelson and George Westbrook, he was a member of the anti-colonial Mau movement. He was subsequently re-elected in the 1926 elections. However, in the 1929 elections he finished last out of four candidates and lost his seat. He ran unsuccessfully again in the 1941 elections.

He died at Apia Government Hospital on 3 October 1953.
