= Fred E. Syddall =

Samoan politician

Member of the Legislative Council
- In office 1920–1923

Personal details
- Born: Manchester, United Kingdom
- Died: 5 May 1934 (aged 72); Tuvao, Western Samoa
- Profession: Businessman, architect

Frederick Ernest Syddall (died 5 May 1934) was a British-born Western Samoan businessman and politician. He was a member of the first Legislative Council from 1920 until 1923.

== Biography ==
Originally from Manchester, Sydddall moved to Western Samoa from South America in 1894. He began farming in Felefa district and worked for the H.J. Moors trading firm. He briefly moved to Fiji, before returning to Samoa and opening his own store in Apia, before taking over the Tuvoa banana and cocoa plantation. He was also an architect.

In December 1919 he was invited by Governor Robert Ward Tate to join an Advisory Council, formed as a precursor to the Legislative Council due to be formed the following year. He was subsequently appointed as one of the first group of 'unofficial' members alongside Alfred Tattersall and Arthur Keeling. He held office for three years, and also served as a member of the Land and Titles Commission for a decade.

Syddall died of a heart attack on 5 May 1934 at his Tuvao plantation, leaving a widow and six children.
