= Alfred James Tattersall =

New Zealand photographer (1866–1951)

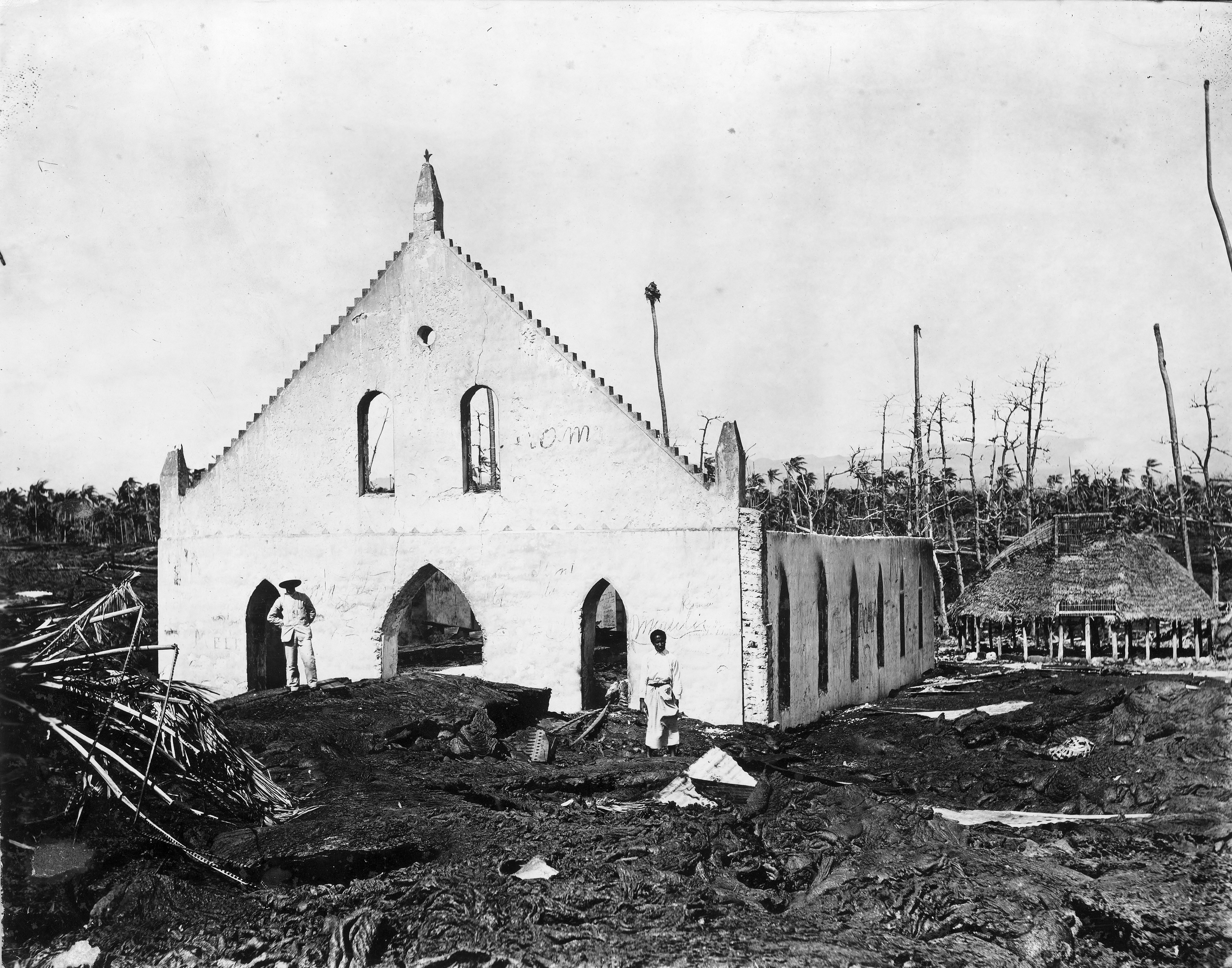
Photo of LMS church captured by AJ Tattersall in Samoa damaged by lava in 1905.

Alfred James Tattersall (29 March 1866 – 25 November 1951) was a New Zealand photographer, who lived in Samoa for most of his life and contributed a significant collection of images of the Pacific Island country and its peoples during the colonial era.

== Biography ==
Tattersall was born in Auckland on 29 March 1877. He moved to Samoa in 1886 to work as an assistant in the studio of John Davis. When Davis died in 1903 Tattersall took over his studio and negative collection. He went on to live in Samoa from 1886 to 1951, including the volatile era when Britain, Germany and the United States were vying for control of the Samoa Islands. Many of his photographs are significant in the history of Samoa and covered eras such as German Samoa (1900 - 1914) followed by the country's administration under New Zealand which saw the rise of the pro-independence Mau movement.

Tattersall went to Samoa in 1886 to be an assistant in the photography studio of British photographer, John Davis. This was the era of colonial photography in the South Pacific when the tropical landscapes and indigenous people provided 'continual fascination' for foreign photographers.

In 1891, another New Zealander, Thomas Andrew joined Davis and Tattersall. In the same year, Tattersall married Blanche Yandall. In 1903, Tattersall took over the business when Davis died. Postcards were a popular part of his business which distributed the images around the world. Apart from landmark historical events, Tattersall also photographed hundreds of landscape scenery and studio portraits of Samoans posing in traditional attire.

In 1920 Tattersall was appointed as one of the three unofficial members of the new Legislative Council of Western Samoa. He contested the 1926 elections to the council, but was unsuccessful.

He died in Western Samoa on 25 November 1951 at the age of 85.

== Gallery ==
Photographs by Tattersall

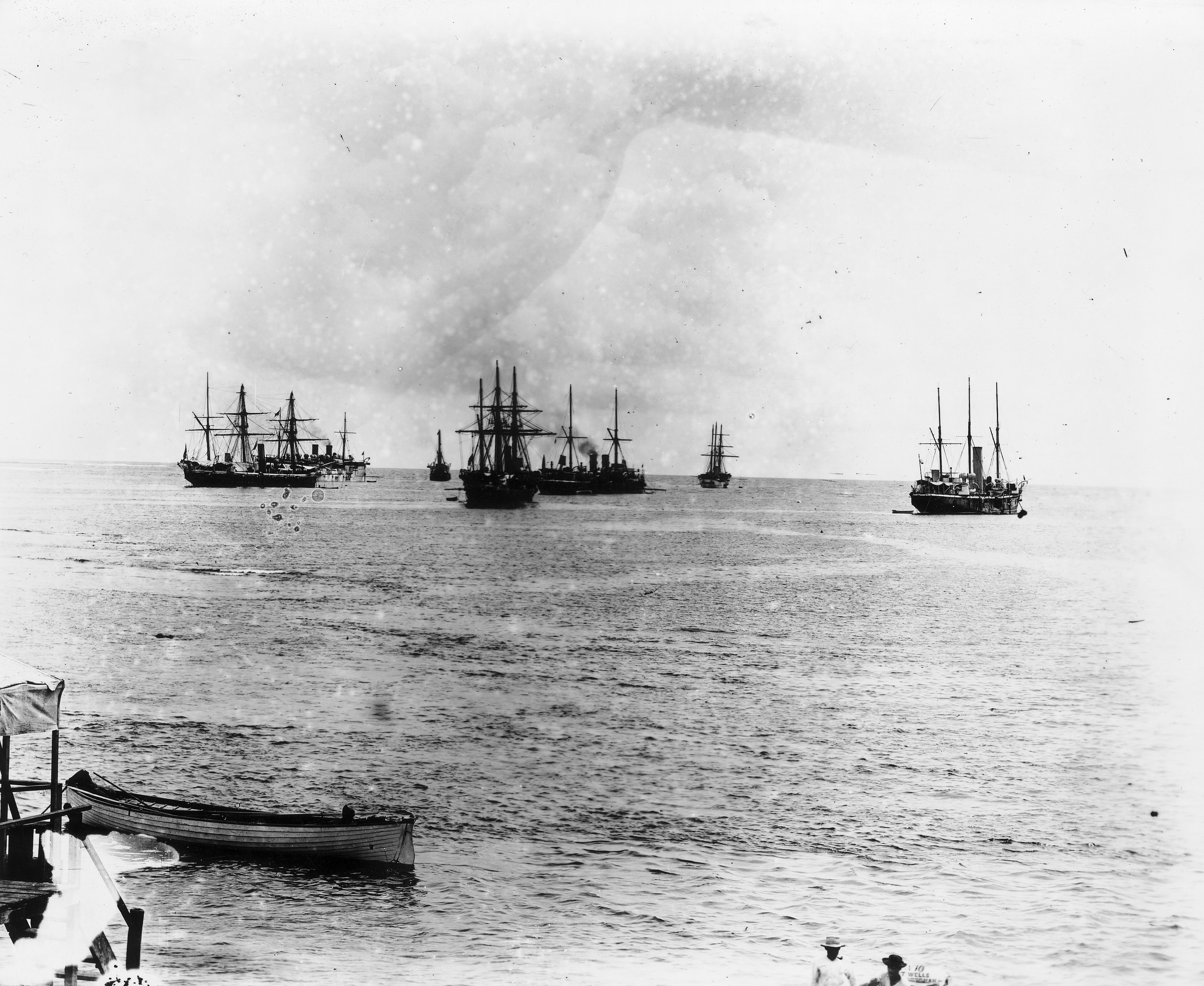
German, British and American warships in Apia harbour, 1899

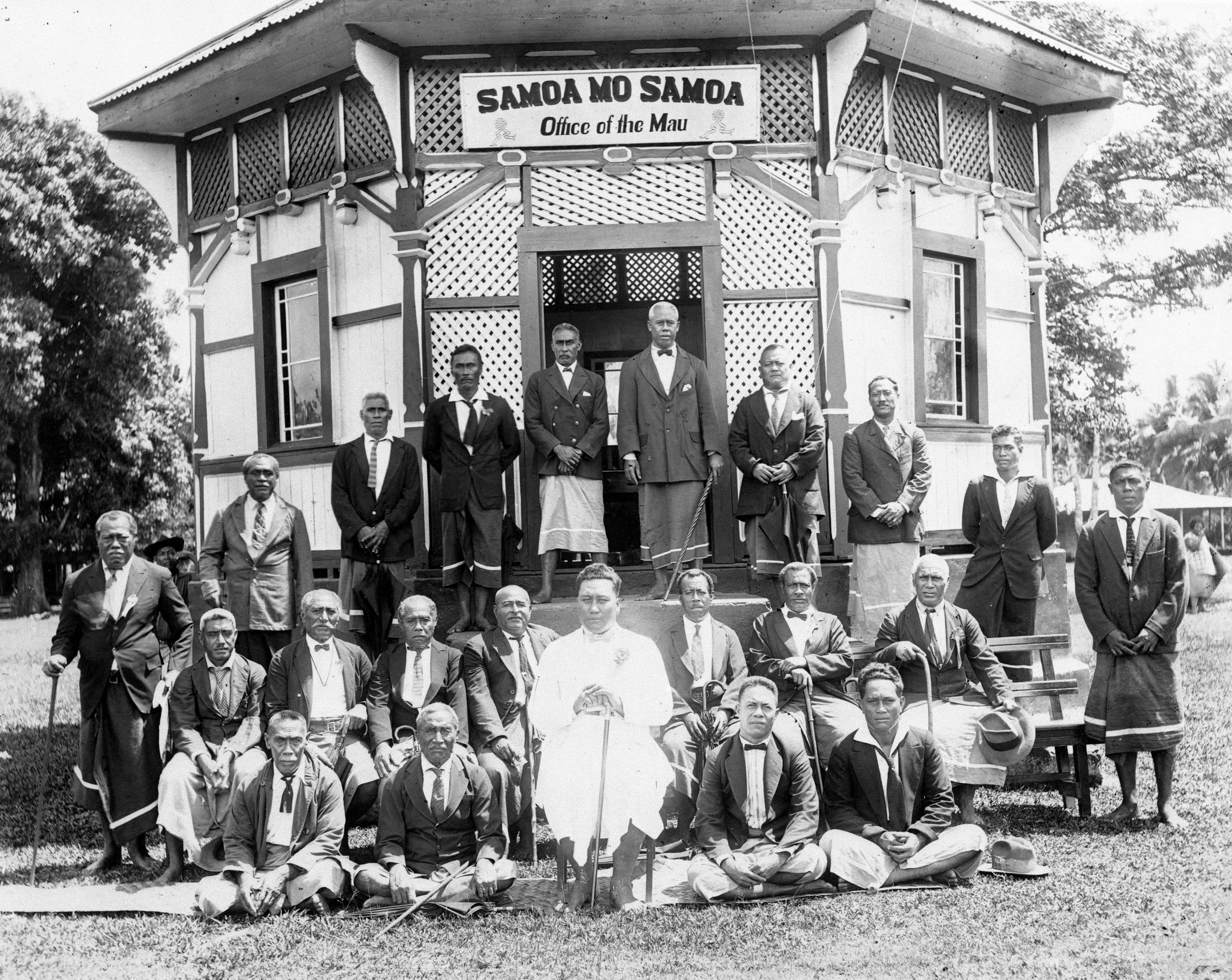
Mau movement leaders and Tupua Tamasese Lealofi III in front of the octagonal Mau office, 1929.

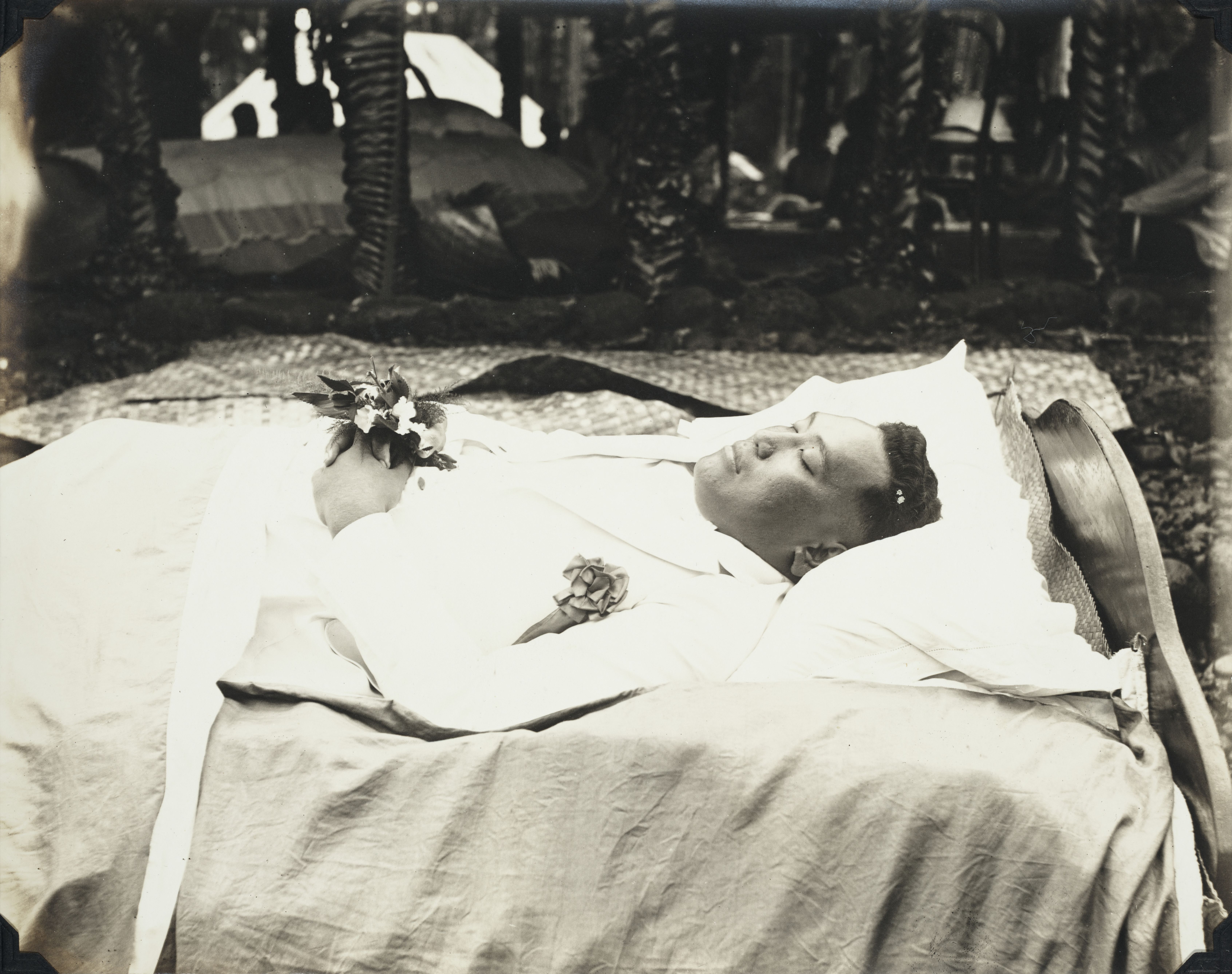
The death of Tupua Tamasese Lealofi III.

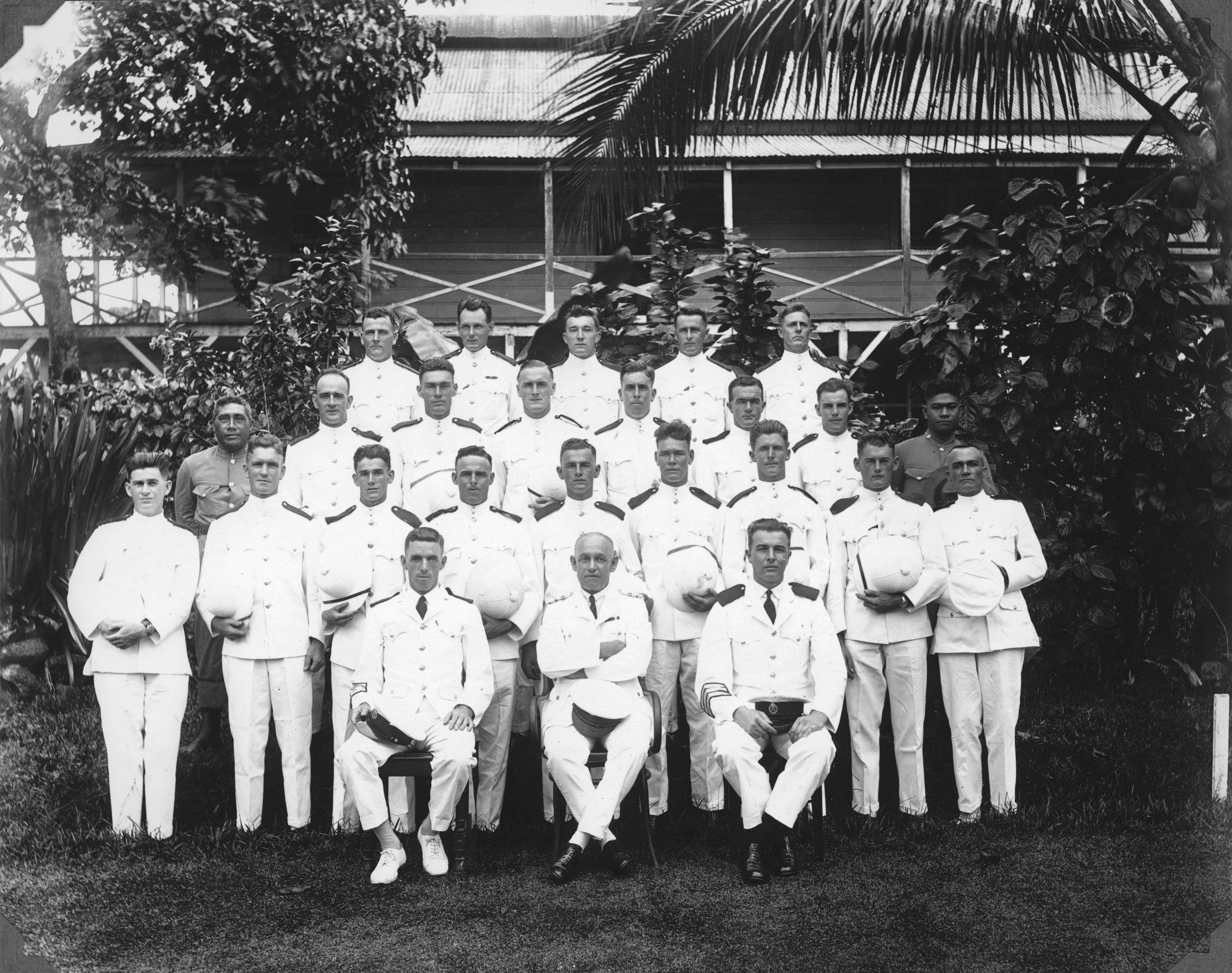
New Zealand police in Samoa, 1930.

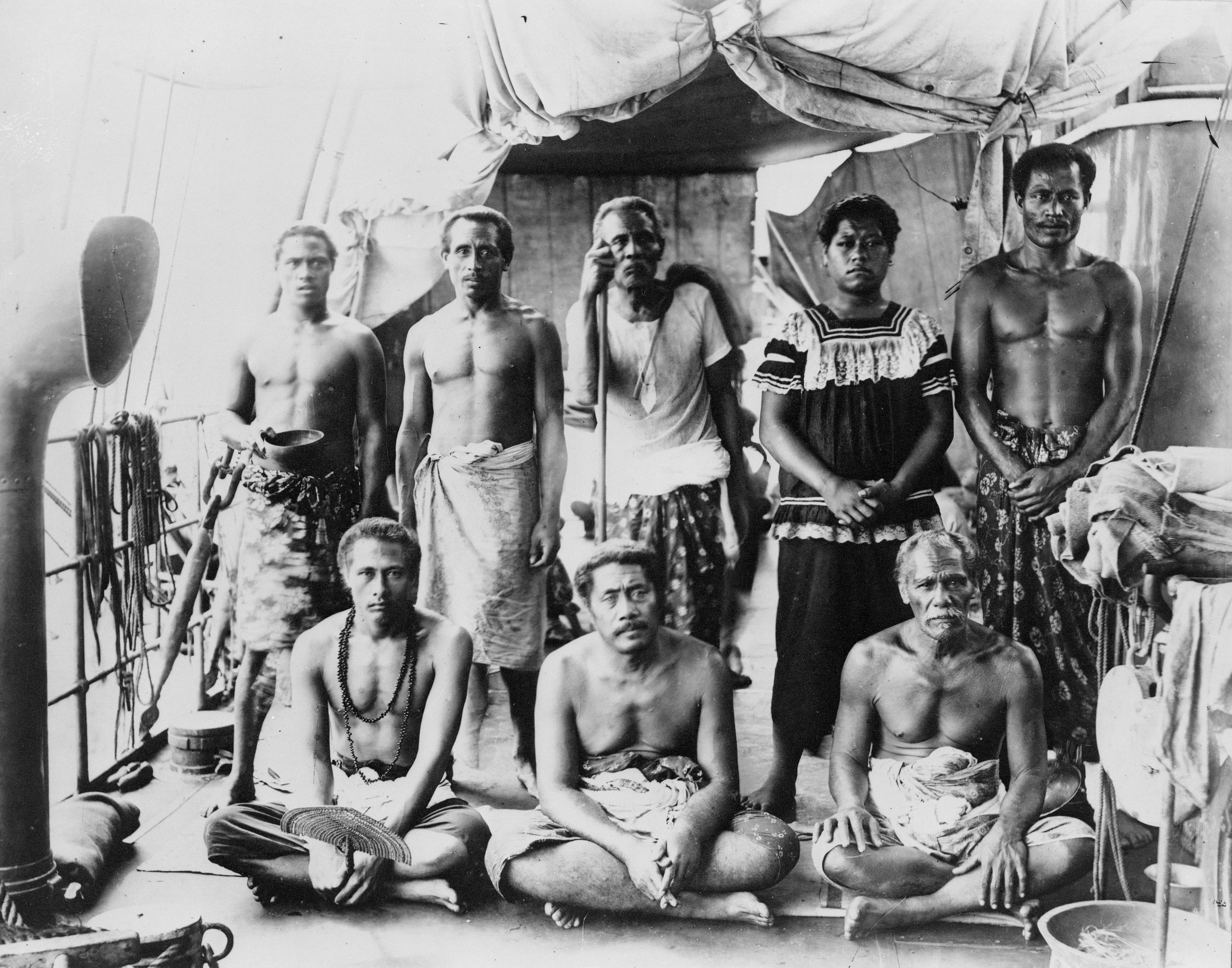
Samoan exiles aboard German warship taking them to Saipan, including Lauaki Namulauulu Mamoe, 1909.

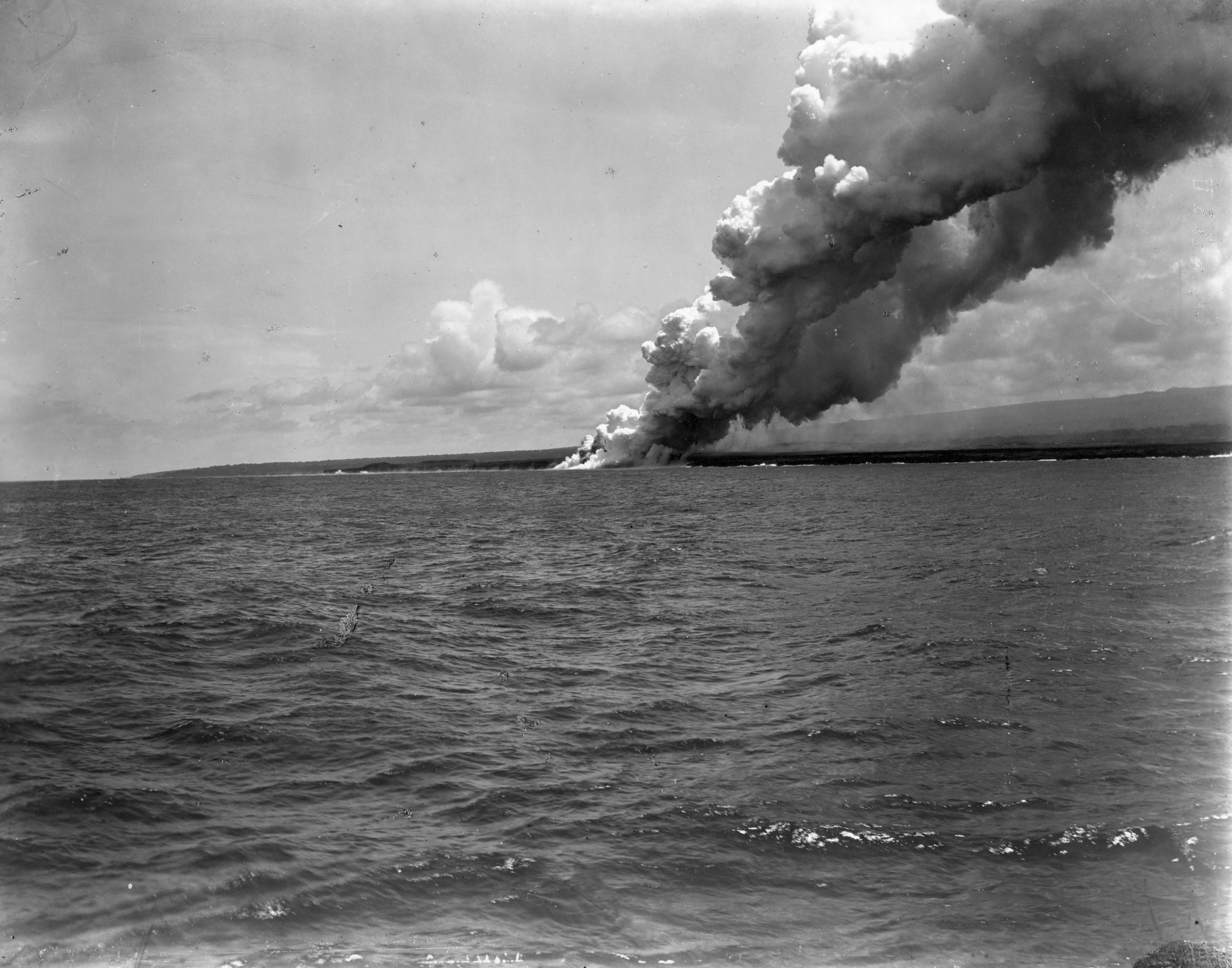
Volcanic eruption of Mt Matavanu on Savai'i, 1905.

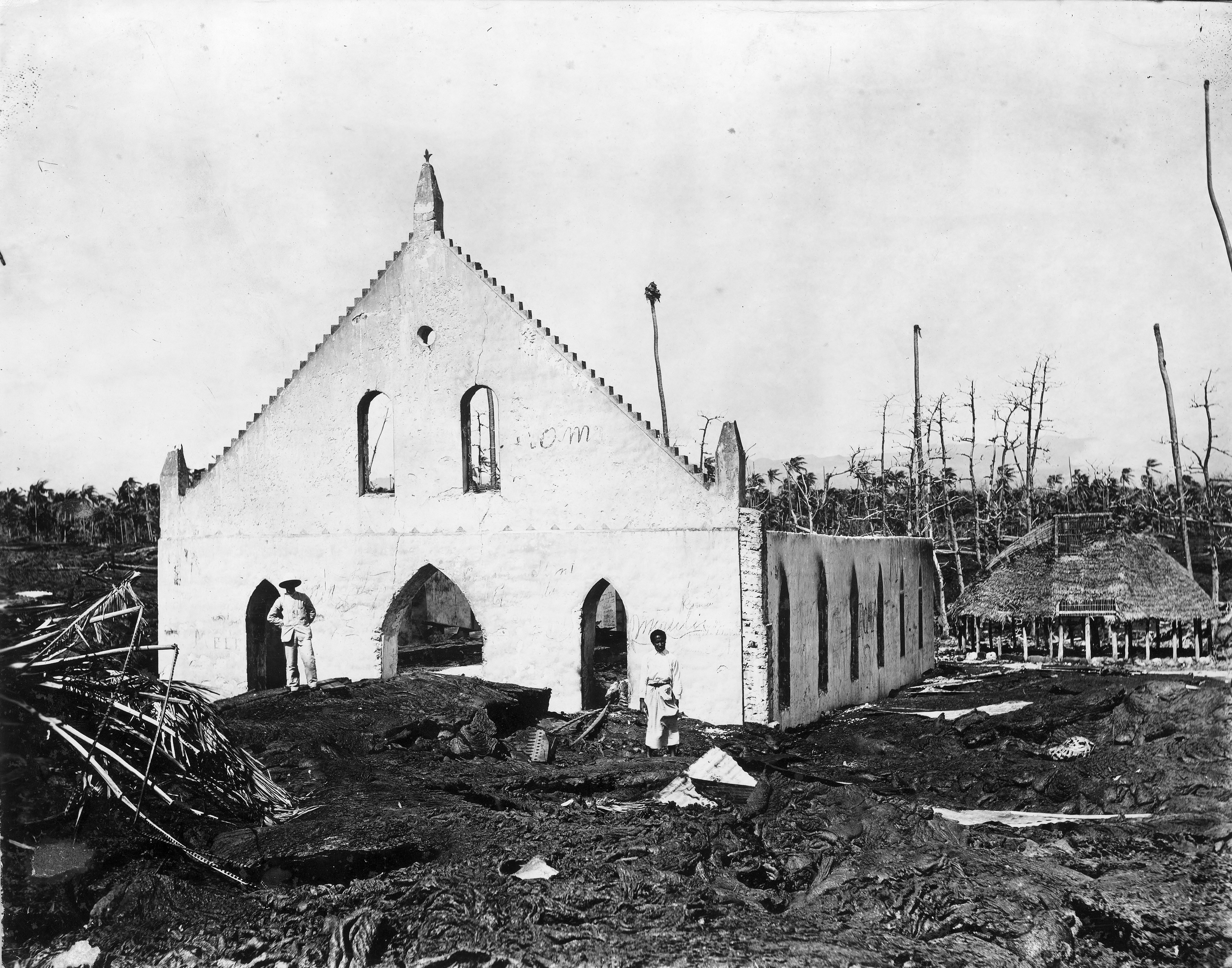
A church damaged by lava on Savai'i, 1905.

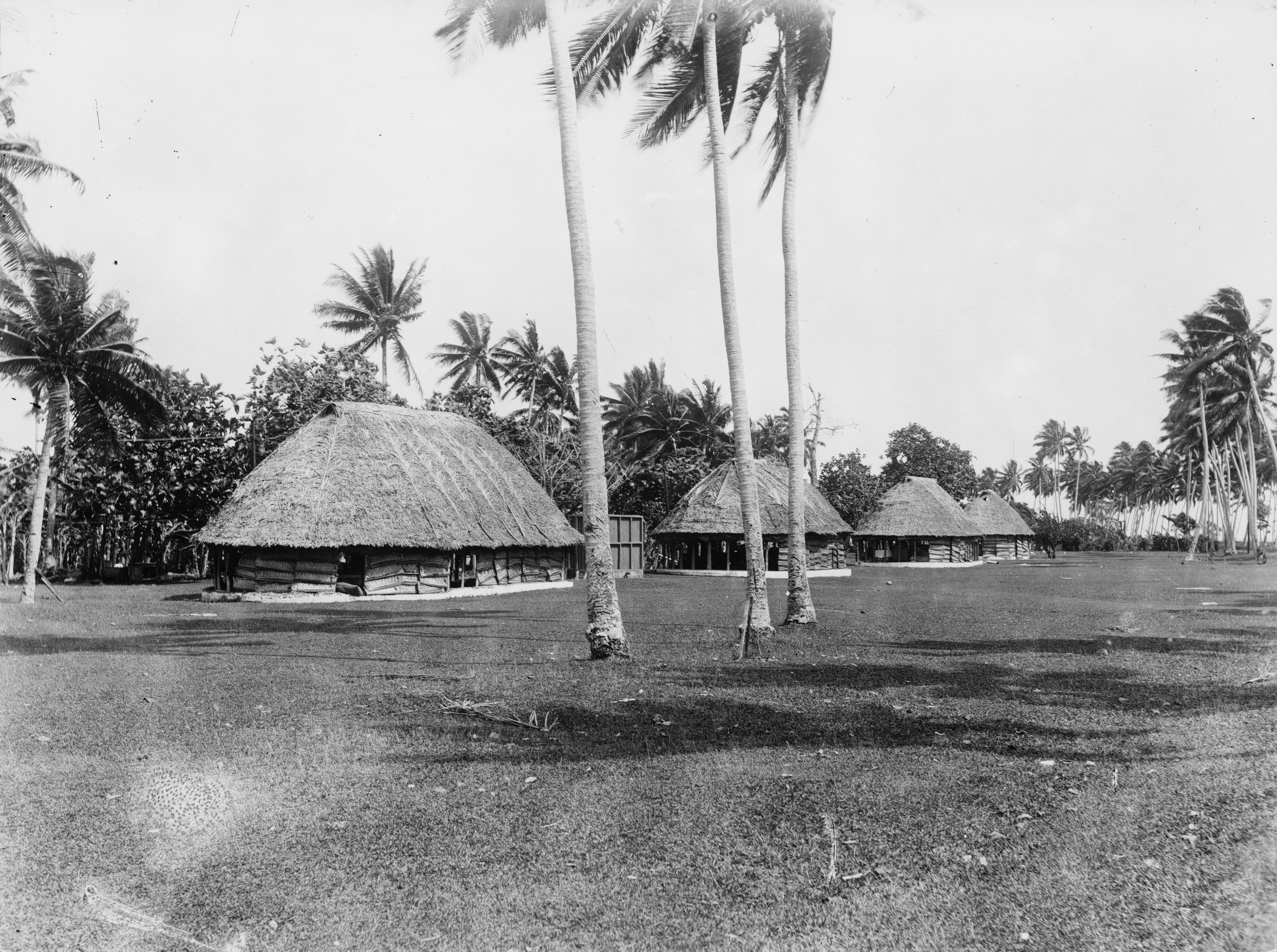
Architecture of Samoa, traditional houses (fale) in Mulinuʻu, circa 1900s.
