= Tuitele =

Tuitele is a surname. Notable people with the surname include:

- Maugaula Tuitele (born 1978), American football player
- Save Liuato Tuitele, American Samoan judge
