= Tafaʻifa =

Historical Samoan title

Tafaʻifa is a historical Samoan title. It was the highest title of the Samoan aristocracy from the 16th to the 19th century.

== History ==
Between roughly the 10th century and the 13th century, Samoa was under the rule of the Tuʻi Tonga Empire. Following Samoa's emancipation from the Tuʻi Tonga in the 13th century, the main power there remained the Tui Manuʻa, a dynasty from what is now American Samoa. Little by little, however, power shifted towards the western part of the archipelago.

According to oral tradition, in the late 15th or early 16th century, the "warrior priestess" Nāfanua unified, by way of a military victory, the four highest pāpā titles then existing in the archipelago – Gatoaʻitele, Tamasoaliʻi, Tui Aʻana, and Tui Ātua. She bequeathed them to her mentor, Levalasi Soʻoaʻemalelagi, who initially refused them for a time before accepting. Subsequently, around the beginning of the 15th century, these titles returned to the latter's niece, Salamāsina, a daughter of Tamalelagi (the concurrent Tui Aʻana) and Vaetoeifaga, a Tongan princess and daughter of the then-Tuʻi Tonga Kauʻulufonua I. Salamāsina would be the first tafaʻifa formally recognised as such.

The title itself was not hereditary, but rather based on the acquisition of the four titles on which it depended, the succession of which could be contested by different potential heirs. Fonoti was said to have been a tafaʻifa in the early part of the 17th century, and Iʻamafana in the late 18th century. The latter chose Malietoa Vainuʻupo to succeed him upon his death in 1802, but this succession was contested. For a quarter of a century, the title of tafaʻifa remained vacant, until Tamafaiga usurped it in 1827 or 1828. After he was killed in 1829, the title was then seized by Malietoa Vainuʻupo following a brief war. In 1830, he converted to Christianity following the arrival of the missionary John Williams, followed by most of the archipelago. Malietoa Vainuʻupo died in 1841, and bequeathed his various titles to three different chiefs, so that none would be tafaʻifa.

Later in the 19th century, the German Empire, United States and United Kingdom vied for dominance over the archipelago, and exploited rivalries between native chiefs. At the same time, other chieftaincy titles gained prominence over the pāpā titles, the four most influential of which were the tama a ʻāiga. Successive attempts to create a Western-style monarchy in Samoa, unrelated to the tafaʻifa title, contributed to the Samoan Civil War. The Tripartite Convention of 1899 partitioned the archipelago into two colonies – German Samoa in the west and American Samoa in the east. The concept of the tafaʻifa fell into disuse following the independence of Western Samoa in 1962, in favour of that of the tama a ʻāiga, from which modern Samoan heads of state are drawn.

== Authority ==
Western visitors in Samoa during the 18th and 19th centuries often referred to the tafaʻifa as a "king", but the title itself did not carry any inherent authority. A tafaʻifa's authority was derived from each of the separate pāpā titles they held, and holding all of them did not grant the individual any access to additional prerogatives. There was no indigenous concept of monarchy in Samoa, where authority remained at the nuʻu (village) level, with villages effectively functioning as "autonomous political entities" in the pre-colonial era.

== See also ==
- History of Samoa
- Faʻamatai
- Tamaʻāiga

== Bibliography ==
- Tuimalealiʻifano, Morgan A. (2006). O tama a ʻāiga: the politics of succession to Sāmoa's paramount titles. Suva, Fiji: IPS Publications, University of the South Pacific. ISBN 978-982-02-0377-8. OCLC 137291091.
- Meleisea, Malama; Meleisea, Penelope Schoeffel (1987). Lagaga: a short history of Western Samoa. Suva: University of the South Pacific. ISBN 978-982-02-0029-6.
- Wendt, Albert (1965). Guardians and Wards: A study of the origins, causes and the first two years of the Mau in Western Samoa. Victoria University of Wellington – via NZETC.
- Williamson, Robert W. (2013). The Social and Political Systems of Central Polynesia. Cambridge: Cambridge University Press. ISBN 978-1-107-62582-2.
