= Tuimalealiʻifano Faʻaoloiʻi Siʻuaʻana I =

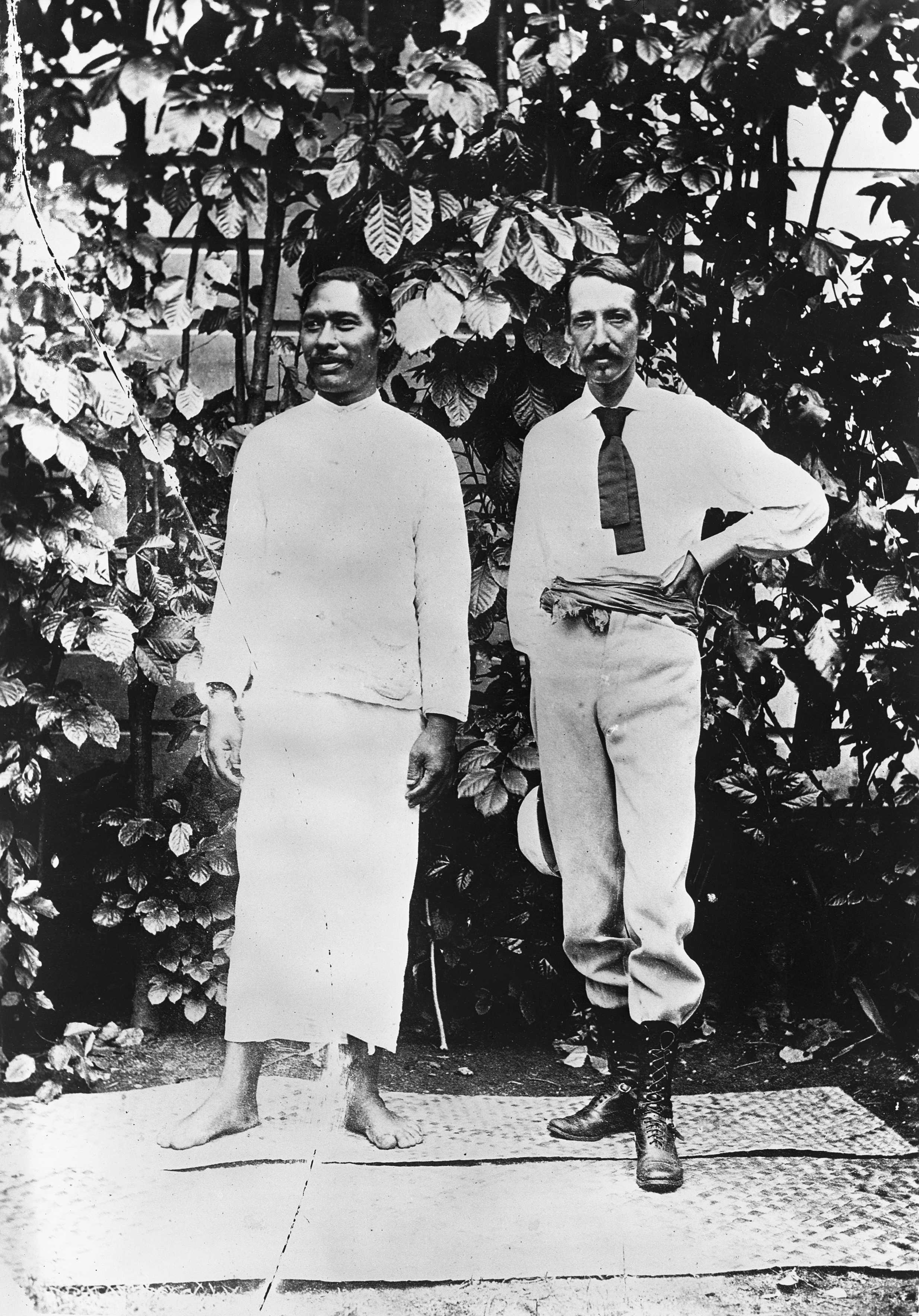
Tuimalealiʻifano with Robert Louis Stevenson at Vailima, Samoa, between 1889 and 1894

Tuimalealiʻifano Faʻaoloivi Siʻuaʻana I (~1854 — 14 October 1937) was a Samoan paramount chief, and the first holder of the Tuimalealiʻifano title. He was one of the leaders of the Mau movement.

Faʻaoloiʻi was the youngest son of Tuiaana Sualauvi. He was raised in Afega, but recalled to Falelatai on the death of his father to take up his chiefly title. In 1889 he was made Kovana Aana (district governor) by the Samoan government. In the 1890s he became a friend of the writer Robert Louis Stevenson. He served as a taʻimua under the German colonial administration, and in 1915 was made a fautua (native advisor) under the New Zealand administration.

== Mau movement ==
In late 1926 Tuimalealiʻifano attended a meeting with Olaf Frederick Nelson and other independence activists at the home of Samuel Meredith to plan the response to an inquiry into Samoan grievances. This led to the formation of the citizens committee, which became the Mau. When he attended a public meeting of the committee, he was suspended as fautua by New Zealand administrator George Spafford Richardson. In August 1927 following the sitting of a commission of inquiry into Samoa he resigned as fautua due to dissatisfaction with the administration. He subsequently became one of the Mau's principal leaders, alongside Tupua Tamasese Lealofi III. He was one of the leaders of the procession on Black Saturday, and attempted to hold back the crowd when the shooting started. He was injured, with a slight wound to the arm, and spent several weeks hiding in the hills with other members of the Mau. He was subsequently arrested and was charged with wearing a Mau lavalava. In March 1930 he was convicted of sedition and fined £3. In April 1930 he was again arrested for wearing Mau uniform and jailed for three months.

In January 1937 he celebrated his "100th birthday" because "he may not live to see it". He died later that year.
