= Sātele =

Sātele Tapumanaia, son of Queen Salamāsina, born in the 16th century, is thought to be the first holder of the chiefly "Sātele" title (alternately spelt as Lesātele or Tapusātele) of the village of Sālani in the Faleālili subdistrict of Ātua,'Upolu.

The popular legend is that Tapumanaia was abducted by High Orators Talo and Tofuiofo'ia of Salani, Faleālili to establish a high chief for their village. However, other historians believe that the queen permitted her son to be raised by people of Faleālili in order to help strengthen alliances and for other political purposes.

Tapumanaia's leadership and lineage would lend to the title's migration and establishment of branches throughout the Samoan Islands in the following villages:

Sātele of Alao, Tutuila

Sātele of Sālani, Upolu

Sātele of Salesatele, Upolu

Sātele of Sataua, Savai'i

Sātele of Vailoatai, Tutuila

In Samoan culture, people can be related either through blood or through title. As such, all who carry the Sātele name today can trace their roots to its original titleholder, Tapumanaia, le alo o Salamāsina.

== See also ==
- Tapumanaia Galu Satele Jr., American politician, educator, and government administrator
