= Samuel Meredith (Western Samoan politician) =

Samoan politician

Member of the Legislative Council
- In office 1929–1932

Personal details
- Born: 9 May 1877; Samoa
- Died: 1936 (aged 59)

Samuel Hornell Meredith (9 May 1877 – 1936) was a Western Samoan businessman and politician. He served as a member of the Legislative Council from 1929 to 1932.

== Biography ==
Meredith was born in Samoa to a British father and Samoan mother and became a merchant. In 1910 he was part of a group that petitioned the German authorities for the introduction of local government in the territory. During the Spanish flu pandemic, seven members of his close family died. He was later given the Samoan chiefly title Tupua.

A critic of the New Zealand administration of Samoa, he contested the first elections to the Legislative Council in 1924, but failed to be elected. He helped the anti-colonial Mau movement gain formal legal representation from a firm of solicitors in New Zealand in 1927, and ran for election again in 1929, this time successfully, as he was elected in second place behind Alexander W. Johnston.

Following a term in office, his chances of re-election in 1932 were seen as slim, and he went on to finish last out of the five candidates contesting the vote.

He died in 1936 at the age of 59 following a long illness.
