= Samoanische Zeitung =

Samoan newspaper

- Editor: Emil Luebke
- Founded: 6 April 1901
- Ceased publication: 28 February 1930
- Language: German and English
- Headquarters: Apia

The Samoanische Zeitung (English: Samoan Newspaper), later known as the Samoa Times, was a newspaper in Samoa published in both English and German.

== History ==
The paper was first published on 6 April 1901, and was a successor to the Samoa Weekly Herald, which had ceased publication on 28 August 1900. The new newspaper initially ran with the first half in German edited by Emil Luebke and the second in English edited by F. Muller. Muller was replaced as the English language editor by James Ah Sue in 1910. After the occupation of Samoa by New Zealand at the start of World War I, it was renamed the Samoa Times and switched to printing primarily in English, with a German supplement. Sue bought the newspaper in 1916, but died in 1918. The Times ceased publication on 28 February 1930, and was replaced by the Samoa Herald and then the Western Samoa Mail.
