= Tupua Tamasese Lealofi III =

Samoan independence leader (1901–1929)

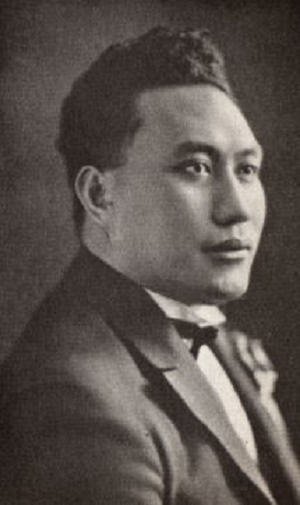
Tupua Tamasese Lealofi III

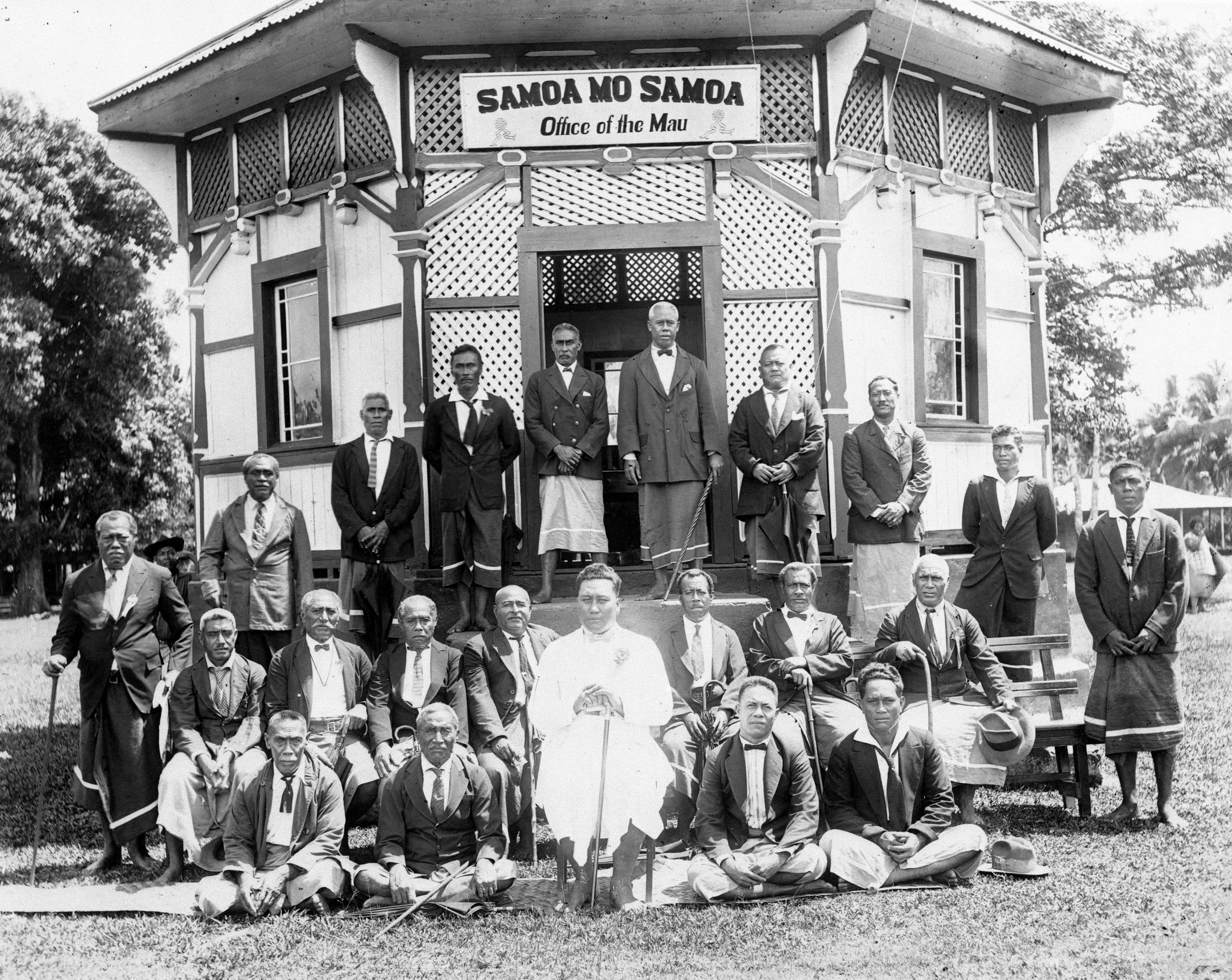
Tupua Tamasese Lealofi III in front of the octagonal Mau office in Vaimoso village, near Apia, 1929. (Photograph by Alfred James Tattersall)

Tupua Tamasese Lealofi-o-ā'ana III (4 May 1901 – 29 December 1929) was a paramount chief of Samoa, holder of the Tupua Tamasese dynastic title and became the leader of the country's pro-independence Mau movement from early 1928 until his assassination by New Zealand police in 1929. Inspired by his Christian beliefs, traditional customs and culture of Samoa, Lealofi III became one of the first leaders of the 20th century to employ nonviolent resistance against colonial rule which laid the foundations for Samoa's successful campaign for independence, which it attained in 1962.

He was fatally shot by New Zealand police during a peaceful Mau procession in Apia on 28 December 1929, in what became known as Black Saturday.

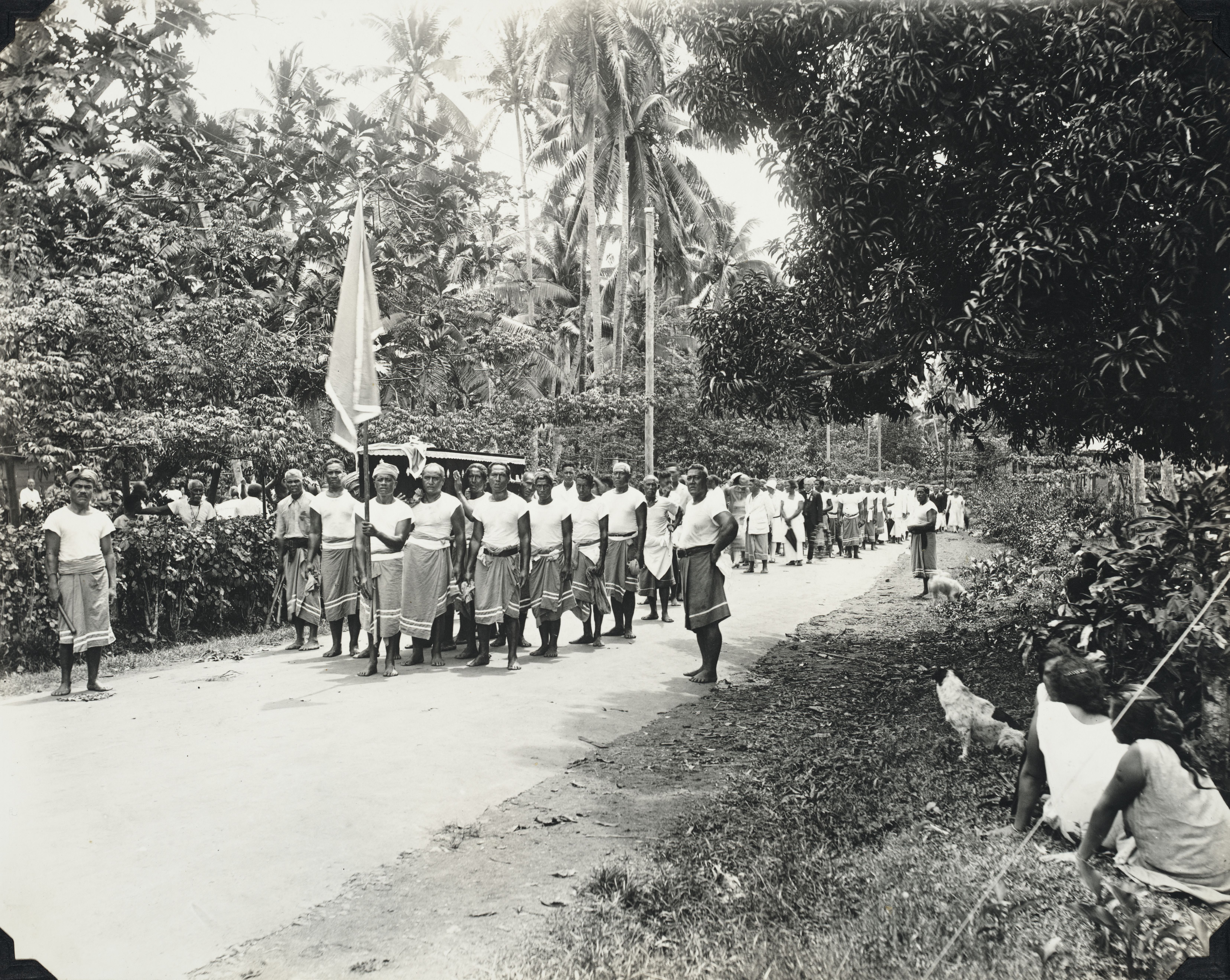
Mau carrying the coffin of Tupua Tamasese Lealofi III. Standing to the right wearing a single white stripe on his lava-lava, the Mau uniform, is Mata'afa Faumuina Fiame Mulinuʻu I, who later became the President of the Mau.

== Mau movement ==
In 1924 Tamasese was banished to Savai'i by Administrator George Spafford Richardson for failing to remove a hibiscus hedge from his land. When he returned to inquire about the length of his banishment, he was imprisoned, deprived of his title, and banished again. This treatment was reported as being one of the main drivers of the Mau movement. When Olaf Frederick Nelson formed the Mau, Tamasese joined, and in 1927 appeared before a commission of inquiry in Apia and argued for Samoan self-government.

Following Nelson's exile from Samoa, Tamasese rose to leadership of the Mau. In early March 1928 Tamasese was arrested along with 400 Mau "police" in an effort by the colonial administration to break a Mau boycott. He acted as their spokesperson when they were put on trial by the colonial administration and during their subsequent imprisonment at Mulinuʻu. Following the prisoners' release, an unsuccessful attempt was made to arrest him.

In September 1928 he refused to pay taxes to the colonial administration, which resulted in another failed attempt to arrest him in early November. He was finally arrested in late November, sentenced to six weeks imprisonment for refusing to pay taxes and six months imprisonment for resisting arrest, and deported to New Zealand to serve his sentence. While in prison he was visited by former Internal Affairs Minister Māui Pōmare. An application for Habeas Corpus on the basis that he should be imprisoned in Samoa rather than New Zealand failed. He was released in June 1929 after serving his full sentence and returned to Samoa, where he was greeted as a hero.

== Death ==
On 28 December 1929 the Mau paraded through Apia to welcome Alfred Smyth home from exile. The colonial administration prepared for the procession by arming the police with revolvers and rifles and mounting a Lewis gun on the police station balcony. A brawl broke out when the police attempted to arrest a man in the procession, and they began firing into the crowd with revolvers. Tamasese rushed to the front of the crowd and called "peace, peace" when he was shot from behind by a police officer on the balcony. Those who attempted to assist him were also shot. Tamasese was taken to hospital, where he died the next day. His final words were:

My blood has been spilt for Samoa. I am proud to give it. Do not dream of avenging it, as it was spilt in peace. If I die, peace must be maintained at any price.

An inquest by a New Zealand coroner found the rifle fire which killed Tamasese to have been unnecessary. Despite this, no-one was prosecuted for his killing.

== Legacy ==
His tomb, constructed of black stones in a tier, is situated in Lepea village beside the main road and 5 minutes from Apia.

His younger brother, Meaole, succeeded him as holder of Tupua Tamasese title and became Tupua Tamasese Meaʻole. He was instrumental in the final stages of securing Samoa's independence, chairing the national Constitutional Committee before assuming office in 1962 as co-Head of State of the newly independent State of Western Samoa.

Tupua Tamasese Lealofi III's eldest son was Tupua Tamasese Lealofi IV (1922–1983), who served two terms as Samoa's prime minister and later, as Deputy Head of State.

== See also ==
- Tupua Tamasese
- Ala Tamasese - spouse
