= List of state leaders who died in office =

This is a list of heads of state and government who died in office. In general, hereditary office holders (kings, queens, emperors, emirs, and the like) and holders of offices where the normal term limit is life (popes, presidents for life, etc.) are excluded because, until recently, their death in office was the norm.

Such deaths have most often been from natural causes, but there are also cases of assassination, execution, suicide, accident and even death in battle.

The list is in chronological order. The name is listed first, followed by the year of death, the country, the name of the office the person held at the time of death, the location of the death (where known) and the cause of death.

== Prior to 1850 ==
Name	Year	Country	Title	Place of death		Cause of death
Mem de Sá	1572	Governorate General of Brazil	Governor General	Salvador	Governorate General of Brazil	
Spencer Compton	1743	Great Britain	Prime Minister	Westminster	Kingdom of Great Britain	Illness
Henry Pelham	1754	Great Britain	Prime Minister	Westminster	Kingdom of Great Britain	Illness – skin infection
Charles Watson-Wentworth	1782	Great Britain	Prime Minister	Wimbledon	Kingdom of Great Britain	Illness – influenza
William Pitt the Younger	1806	United Kingdom	Prime Minister	Putney	United Kingdom	Illness – peptic ulceration
Mateo de Toro Zambrano	1811	Chile	President of the Government Junta	Santiago	Chile	
Spencer Perceval	1812	United Kingdom	Prime Minister	Westminster	United Kingdom	Assassination – shooting
George Canning	1827	United Kingdom	Prime Minister	Chiswick	United Kingdom	Illness – pneumonia
Pedro Blanco Soto	1829	Bolivia	Provisional President	La Plata	Bolivia	Assassination
Ioannis Kapodistrias	1831	Greece	Governor	Nafplion	Greece	Assassination – shooting and stabbing
Manuel González Salmón	1832	Spain	Prime Minister	Madrid	Spain	Illness
Casimir Pierre Périer	1832	France	Prime Minister	Paris	France	Illness – cholera
Miguel Barragán	1836	Mexico	President	Mexico City	Mexico	Illness – typhus
José Gaspar Rodriguez de Francia	1840	Paraguay	Supreme Dictator	Asunción	Paraguay	Illness
William Henry Harrison	1841	United States	President	Washington, D.C.	United States	Illness – pneumonia or enteric fever
Agustín Gamarra	1841	Peru	President	Ingavi	Peru	Killed in action
Philippe Guerrier	1845	Haiti	President	Saint-Marc	Haiti	Illness
Mathabarsingh Thapa	1845	(Kingdom of Nepal) Nepal	Prime Minister	Kathmandu	Kingdom of Nepal	Assassination – shooting
Fateh Jung Shah	1846	(Kingdom of Nepal) Nepal	Prime Minister	Kathmandu	Kingdom of Nepal	Assassination
Jean-Baptiste Riché	1847	Haiti	President	Port-au-Prince	Haiti	Illness or poisoning

== 1850–1899 ==
Name	Year	Country	Title	Place of death		Cause of death
Zachary Taylor	1850	United States	President	Washington, D.C.	United States	Illness – cholera or gastroenteritis(Possible assassination)
Prince Felix of Schwarzenberg	1852	Austria	Minister-President	Vienna	Austrian Empire	Stroke
Avram Petronijević	1852	Serbia	Representative of the Prince	Constantinople	Ottoman Empire	
Josef Munzinger	1855	Switzerland	Member of the Federal Council	Bern	Switzerland	
Henri Druey	1855	Switzerland	Member of the Federal Council	Bern	Switzerland	Stroke
Stefano Franscini	1857	Switzerland	Member of the Federal Council	Bern	Switzerland	
Mustafa Reşid Pasha	1858	Ottoman Empire	Grand Vizier	Constantinople	Ottoman Empire	Myocardial infarction
Carl Edvard Rotwitt	1860	Denmark	Prime Minister	Copenhagen	Denmark	
Camillo Benso, Count of Cavour	1861	Italy	Prime Minister	Turin	Kingdom of Italy	Illness – malaria
Jonas Furrer	1861	Switzerland	Member of the Federal Council	Bad Ragaz	Switzerland	Illness – kidney disease
José Santos Guardiola	1862	Honduras	President	Comayagua	Honduras	Assassination – shooting
Barbu Catargiu	1862	Romanian United Principalities	Prime Minister	Bucharest	Romanian United Principalities	Assassination – shooting
Carlos Antonio López	1862	Paraguay	President	Asunción	Paraguay	Illness – gout and other diseases
José Antonio Salcedo	1864	Dominican Republic	President	Maimón	Dominican Republic	Assassination – shooting
Rafael Carrera	1865	Guatemala	President	Guatemala City	Guatemala	Illness – dysentery
Abraham Lincoln	1865	United States	President	Washington, D.C.	United States	Assassination – shooting
Henry Temple, Viscount Palmerston	1865	United Kingdom	Prime Minister	Hertfordshire	United Kingdom	Illness – fever
Marcos Paz	1868	Argentina	Interim President	Buenos Aires	Argentina	Illness – cholera
Ramón María Narváez	1868	Spain	Prime Minister	Madrid	Spain	Illness – lung disease
Victor Ruffy	1869	Switzerland	Member of the Federal Council	Bern	Switzerland	
Francisco Solano López	1870	Paraguay	President	Cerro Corá	Paraguay	Killed in action
Juan Prim	1870	Spain	Prime Minister	Madrid	Spain	Assassination
Mehmed Emin Âli Pasha	1871	Ottoman Empire	Grand Vizier	Constantinople	Ottoman Empire	Illness – tuberculosis
Johan Rudolph Thorbecke	1872	Netherlands	Prime Minister	The Hague	Netherlands	Illness – cold
Benito Juárez	1872	Mexico	President	Mexico City	Mexico	Myocardial infarction
José Balta	1872	Peru	President	Lima	Peru	Assassination – shooting
Tomás Gutiérrez	1872	Peru	President	Lima	Peru	Assassination – lynching
Milivoje Blaznavac	1873	Serbia	President of the Ministry	Belgrade	Serbia	Myocardial infarction
Adolfo Ballivián	1874	Bolivia	President	La Paz	Bolivia	Illness – stomach cancer
Barthélémy de Theux de Meylandt	1874	Belgium	Prime Minister	Heusden	Belgium	
Gabriel García Moreno	1875	Ecuador	President	Quito	Ecuador	Assassination – shooting and stabbing
Ahmed Esad Pasha	1875	Ottoman Empire	Grand Vizier	İzmir	Ottoman Empire	Assassination – poisoning
Juan Bautista Gill	1877	Paraguay	President	Villarrica	Paraguay	Assassination – shooting
Konstantinos Kanaris	1877	Greece	Prime Minister	Athens	Greece	Myocardial infarction and hemiplegia
Francisco Linares Alcántara	1878	Venezuela	President	La Guaira	Venezuela	Illness – bronchial disorder
Johann Jakob Scherer	1878	Switzerland	Member of the Federal Council	Bern	Switzerland	Illness – appendicitis
Tēvita ʻUnga	1879	Tonga	Premier	Auckland	New Zealand	Illness – liver disease
Cándido Bareiro	1880	Paraguay	President	Asunción	Paraguay	Stroke
Fridolin Anderwert	1880	Switzerland	Member of the Federal Council	Bern	Switzerland	Suicide – gunshot
James A. Garfield	1881	United States	President	Elberon	United States	Assassination – shooting and medical ineptitude
Tomás Guardia Gutiérrez	1882	Costa Rica	President	Alajuela	Costa Rica	Illness – tuberculosis
Próspero Fernández Oreamuno	1885	Costa Rica	President	Atenas	Costa Rica	
Justo Rufino Barrios	1885	Guatemala	President	Chalchuapa	El Salvador	Killed in battle
Ranodip Singh Kunwar	1885	Nepal	Prime Minister	Kathmandu	Nepal	Assassination
Francisco Javier Zaldúa	1885	Colombia	President	Bogotá	Colombia	
Agostino Depretis	1887	Italy	Prime Minister	Stradella	Italy	Illness – gout
Wilhelm Hertenstein	1888	Switzerland	President of the Confederation	Bern	Switzerland	Illness and complications following surgery
Francisco Menéndez	1890	El Salvador	President	San Salvador	El Salvador	Killed during a coup
John A. Macdonald	1891	Canada	Prime Minister	Ottawa	Canada	Stroke
John Ballance	1893	New Zealand	Prime Minister	Wellington	New Zealand	Intestinal disease and complications following surgery
Louis Ruchonnet	1893	Switzerland	Member of the Federal Council	Bern	Switzerland	Myocardial infarction
Lazar Dokić	1893	Serbia	President of the Ministry	Opatija	Austria-Hungary	
Remigio Morales Bermúdez	1894	Peru	President	Lima	Peru	Illness – appendicitis
Marie François Sadi Carnot	1894	France	President (also Co-Prince of Andorra)	Lyon	France	Assassination – stabbing
Rafael Núñez	1894	Colombia	President	Bogotá	Colombia	Stroke
John Sparrow David Thompson	1894	Canada	Prime Minister	Berkshire	United Kingdom	Myocardial infarction
Karl Schenk	1895	Switzerland	Member of the Federal Council	Bern	Switzerland	Accident – struck by carriage
Florvil Hyppolite	1896	Haiti	President	Port-au-Prince	Haiti	Stroke
Joseph James Cheeseman	1896	Liberia	President	Monrovia	Liberia	
Friedrich Stellwag von Carion	1896	Liechtenstein	State Administrator	Vienna	Austria-Hungary	
Antonio Cánovas del Castillo	1897	Spain	Prime Minister	Mondragón	Spain	Assassination – shooting
Juan Idiarte Borda	1897	Uruguay	President	Montevideo	Uruguay	Assassination – shooting
José María Reina Barrios	1898	Guatemala	President	Guatemala City	Guatemala	Assassination – shooting
Félix Faure	1899	France	President (also Co-Prince of Andorra)	Paris	France	Myocardial infarction
Ulises Heureaux	1899	Dominican Republic	President	Moca	Dominican Republic	Assassination – shooting

== 1900–1949 ==
Name	Year	Country	Title	Place of death		Cause of death
Federico Errázuriz Echaurren	1901	Chile	President	Valparaíso	Chile	Illness – cerebral thrombosis
William McKinley	1901	United States	President	Buffalo	United States	Assassination – shooting
Halil Rifat Pasha	1901	Ottoman Empire	Grand Vizier	Constantinople	Ottoman Empire	
Ramon Riu i Cabanes	1901	Andorra	Co-Prince	La Seu d'Urgell	Spain	
Walter Hauser	1902	Switzerland	Member of the Federal Council	Bern	Switzerland	Stroke
Dimitrije Cincar-Marković	1903	Serbia	President of the Ministry	Belgrade	Serbia	Assassination
Manuel Candamo	1904	Peru	President	Arequipa	Peru	Heart attack
Theodoros Deligiannis	1905	Greece	Prime Minister	Athens	Greece	Assassination – stabbing
Manuel Quintana	1906	Argentina	President	Buenos Aires	Argentina	Illness – pneumonia
Richard Seddon	1906	New Zealand	Prime Minister	At sea		Heart attack
Dimitar Petkov	1907	Bulgaria	Prime Minister	Sofia	Bulgaria	Assassination – shooting
Ali-Asghar Atabak	1907	Iran	Prime Minister	Tehran	Iran	Assassination – shooting
Jules de Trooz	1907	Belgium	Cabinet Chief	Brussels	Belgium	
Afonso Pena	1909	Brazil	President	Rio de Janeiro	Brazil	Illness – pneumonia
José Domingo de Obaldía	1910	Panama	President	Panama City	Panama	
Boutros Ghali	1910	Egypt	Prime Minister	Cairo	Egypt	Assassination – shooting
Pedro Montt	1910	Chile	President	Bremen	German Empire	Stroke
Elías Fernández Albano	1910	Chile	Acting President	Santiago	Chile	Illness – cold
Ernst Brenner	1911	Switzerland	Member of the Federal Council	Menton	France	Stroke
Pyotr Stolypin	1911	Russian Empire	Prime Minister	Kiev	Russian Empire	Assassination – shooting
Ramón Cáceres	1911	Dominican Republic	President	Santo Domingo	Dominican Republic	Assassination – shooting
Emilio Estrada Carmona	1911	Ecuador	President	Guayaquil	Ecuador	Heart attack
Adolf Deucher	1912	Switzerland	Member of the Federal Council	Bern	Switzerland	Illness
Cincinnatus Leconte	1912	Haiti	President	Port-au-Prince	Haiti	Accident – explosion
José Canalejas	1912	Spain	Prime Minister	Madrid	Spain	Assassination – shooting
Manuel Enrique Araujo	1913	El Salvador	President	San Salvador	El Salvador	Assassination – shooting and stabbing
Tancrède Auguste	1913	Haiti	President	Port-au-Prince	Haiti	Illness – anemia
Mahmud Shevket Pasha	1913	Ottoman Empire	Grand Vizier	Istanbul	Ottoman Empire	Assassination – shooting
Carl von In der Maur	1913	Liechtenstein	State Administrator	Vaduz	Liechtenstein	Stroke
Roque Sáenz Peña	1914	Argentina	President	Buenos Aires	Argentina	Illness
Vilbrun Guillaume Sam	1915	Haiti	President	Port-au-Prince	Haiti	Assassination – beating
Paul Eyschen	1915	Luxembourg	Prime Minister	Luxembourg	Luxembourg	Illness – heart and kidney disease
Yuan Shikai	1916	China	President	Beijing	China	Illness – uraemia
Karl von Stürgkh	1916	Austria-Hungary	Minister-President of Cisleithania	Vienna	Austria-Hungary	Assassination – shooting
Sidónio Pais	1918	Portugal	President	Lisbon	Portugal	Assassination – shooting
Rodrigues Alves	1919	Brazil	President-elect	Rio de Janeiro	Brazil	Illness – Spanish flu
Yakov Sverdlov	1919	Russian SFSR	Chairman of the All-Russian Central Executive Committee	Moscow	Russian SFSR	Illness – Spanish flu or typhus
Manuel Franco	1919	Paraguay	President	Asunción	Paraguay	Cardiac arrest
Louis Botha	1919	South Africa	Prime Minister	Pretoria	South Africa	Illness – Spanish flu
Eduard Müller	1919	Switzerland	Member of the Federal Council	Bern	Switzerland	
Alexander Kolchak	1920	Russian State	Supreme Ruler	Irkutsk	Russian State	Execution – shooting
Venustiano Carranza	1920	Mexico	President	Tlaxcalantongo	Mexico	Assassination – shooting
António Maria Baptista	1920	Portugal	Prime Minister	Lisbon	Portugal	Stroke or apoplexy
Eduardo Dato	1921	Spain	Prime Minister	Madrid	Spain	Assassination – shooting
António Granjo	1921	Portugal	Prime Minister	Lisbon	Portugal	Assassination – shooting
Hara Takashi	1921	Japan	Prime Minister	Tokyo	Japan	Assassination – stabbing
Arthur Griffith	1922	Ireland	President of Dáil Éireann	Dublin	Ireland	Illness – cerebral haemorrhage
Michael Collins	1922	Ireland	Chairman of the Provisional Government	Béal na Bláth	Ireland	Assassination – shooting
Gabriel Narutowicz	1922	Poland	President	Warsaw	Poland	Assassination – shooting
Jalkhanz Khutagt Sodnomyn Damdinbazar	1923	Mongolia	Prime Minister	Niislel Khüree	China	
Warren G. Harding	1923	United States	President	San Francisco	United States	Heart attack
Vladimir Lenin	1924	Soviet Union	Chairman of the Council of People's Commissars	Gorki	Soviet Union	Stroke
Rafael López Gutiérrez	1924	Honduras	President	Amapala	Honduras	Illness – diabetes
Friedrich Ebert	1925	Germany	President	Berlin	Germany	Illness – septic shock
Sun Yat-sen	1925	China	Generalissimo of the National Government	Beijing	China	Illness – gall bladder cancer
William Ferguson Massey	1925	New Zealand	Prime Minister	Wellington	New Zealand	Illness – cancer
Katō Takaaki	1926	Japan	Prime Minister	Tokyo	Japan	Illness – pneumonia
Jón Magnússon	1926	Iceland	Prime Minister	Neskaupstaður	Iceland	
José María Orellana	1926	Guatemala	President	Antigua Guatemala	Guatemala	Heart attack
Jānis Čakste	1927	Latvia	President	Riga	Latvia	
Charles Coghlan	1927	Southern Rhodesia	Premier	Salisbury	Southern Rhodesia	Illness – cerebral haemorrhage
Balingiin Tserendorj	1928	Mongolia	Chairman of the Council of People's Commissars	Ulaanbaatar	Mongolia	Illness
Zhang Zuolin	1928	China	Generalissimo of the Military Government	Shenyang	China	Assassination – bombing
Abdul Muhsin al-Sa'dun	1929	Iraq	Prime Minister	Baghdad	Iraq	Suicide – gunshot
Peder Kolstad	1932	Norway	Prime Minister	Oslo	Norway	Blood clot
Paul Doumer	1932	France	President (also Co-Prince of Andorra)	Paris	France	Assassination – shooting
Inukai Tsuyoshi	1932	Japan	Prime Minister	Tokyo	Japan	Assassination – shooting
Luis Miguel Sánchez Cerro	1933	Peru	President	Lima	Peru	Assassination – shooting
Ion G. Duca	1933	Romania	Prime Minister	Prahova	Romania	Assassination – shooting
Engelbert Dollfuss	1934	Austria	Chancellor	Vienna	Austria	Assassination – shooting
Paul von Hindenburg	1934	Germany	President	Neudeck	Germany	Illness – lung cancer
Józef Piłsudski	1935	Poland	Minister of Military Affairs	Warsaw	Poland	Illness – liver cancer
Juan Vicente Gómez	1935	Venezuela	President	Maracay	Venezuela	Illness – prostate cancer
Konstantinos Demertzis	1936	Greece	Prime Minister	Athens	Greece	Heart attack
Gyula Gömbös	1936	Hungary	Prime Minister	Munich	Germany	Illness – testicular cancer
Panas Lyubchenko	1937	Ukrainian SSR	Chairman of the Council of People's Commissars	Moscow	USSR	Suicide – gunshot
Mustafa Kemal Atatürk	1938	Turkey	President	Istanbul	Turkey	Illness – liver cirrhosis
Patriarch Miron	1939	Romania	Prime Minister	Cannes	France	Illness – pneumonia
Joseph Lyons	1939	Australia	Prime Minister	Sydney	Australia	Heart attack
Germán Busch	1939	Bolivia	President	La Paz	Bolivia	Suicide – gunshot
Armand Călinescu	1939	Romania	Prime Minister	Bucharest	Romania	Assassination – shooting
Aurelio Mosquera	1939	Ecuador	President	Quito	Ecuador	Illness – liver infection or suicide
Giuseppe Motta	1940	Switzerland	Member of the Federal Council	Bern	Switzerland	Stroke
Justí Guitart i Vilardebó	1940	Andorra	Co-Prince	Barcelona	Spain	
Lord Tweedsmuir	1940	Canada	Governor General	Montreal	Canada	Head injury following stroke
Jacinto Peynado	1940	Dominican Republic	President	Santo Domingo	Dominican Republic	
Michael Joseph Savage	1940	New Zealand	Prime Minister	Wellington	New Zealand	Illness – colon cancer
José Félix Estigarribia	1940	Paraguay	President	Altos	Paraguay	Accident – plane crash
Hassan Sabry Pasha	1940	Egypt	Prime Minister	Cairo	Egypt	Heart failure
Kyösti Kallio	1940	Finland	President	Helsinki	Finland	Heart attack
Ioannis Metaxas	1941	Greece	Prime Minister	Athens	Greece	Illness – severe throat infection with systemic complications
Pál Teleki	1941	Hungary	Prime Minister	Budapest	Hungary	Suicide – gunshot
Alexandros Koryzis	1941	Greece	Prime Minister	Athens	Greece	Suicide – gunshot
Johannes Lauristin	1941	Estonian SSR	Chairman of the Council of People's Commissars	At sea		
Pedro Aguirre Cerda	1941	Chile	President	Santiago	Chile	Illness – tuberculosis
José Abad Santos	1942	Philippines	Interim President	Malabang	Empire of Japan	Execution – shooting
Thorvald Stauning	1942	Denmark	Prime Minister	Copenhagen	Denmark	Illness
Taj al-Din al-Hasani	1943	Syria	President	Damascus	Syria	Heart attack
Władysław Sikorski	1943	Poland	Prime Minister	Gibraltar	Gibraltar	Accident – plane crash
Lin Sen	1943	China	Chairman of the National Government	Chongqing	China	Stroke
Manuel L. Quezon	1944	Philippines	President	Saranac Lake	United States	Illness – tuberculosis
Wang Jingwei	1944	Republic of China	Chairman of the National Government (at Nanjing)	Nagoya	Japan	Complications from gunshot wound
Ahmad Maher Pasha	1945	Egypt	Prime Minister	Cairo	Egypt	Assassination – shooting
Franklin D. Roosevelt	1945	United States	President	Warm Springs	United States	Illness – cerebral haemorrhage
John Curtin	1945	Australia	Prime Minister	Canberra	Australia	Heart attack
Adolf Hitler	1945	Germany	Führer	Berlin	Germany	Suicide – gunshot
Joseph Goebbels	1945	Germany	Chancellor	Berlin	Germany	Suicide – gunshot
Juan Antonio Ríos	1946	Chile	President	Santiago	Chile	Illness – cancer
Gualberto Villarroel	1946	Bolivia	President	La Paz	Bolivia	Assassination – lynching
Per Albin Hansson	1946	Sweden	Prime Minister	Stockholm	Sweden	Heart attack
Nguyen Van Thinh	1946	Cochinchina	President of the Provisional Government	Saigon	Cochinchina	Suicide – hanging
Johannes Vares	1946	Estonian SSR	Chairman of the Presidium of the Supreme Soviet	Tallinn	USSR	Suicide
Aung San	1947	Burma	Premier	Yangon	Burma	Assassination – shooting
Tomás Berreta	1947	Uruguay	President	Montevideo	Uruguay	Illness – prostate cancer
Manuel Roxas	1948	Philippines	President	Clark Air Base	Philippines	Heart attack
Muhammad Ali Jinnah	1948	Pakistan	Governor-General	Karachi	Pakistan	Illness – heart failure
Mahmoud an-Nukrashi Pasha	1948	Egypt	Prime Minister	Cairo	Egypt	Assassination – shooting
Mir Bashir Gasimov	1949	Azerbaijan SSR	Chairman of the Presidium of the Supreme Soviet	Baku	USSR	
Themistoklis Sofoulis	1949	Greece	Prime Minister	Kifissia	Greece	Illness
Georgi Dimitrov	1949	Bulgaria	Chairman of the Council of Ministers	Barvikha	USSR	Illness – heart and liver disease, abdominal cancer and internal haemorrhages
Husni al-Za'im	1949	Syria	President	Damascus	Syria	Execution by firing squad
Muhsin al-Barazi	1949	Syria	Prime Minister	Damascus	Syria	Execution by firing squad

== 1950–1999 ==
Name	Year	Country	Title	Place of death		Cause of death
Vasil Kolarov	1950	Bulgaria	Prime Minister	Sofia	Bulgaria	Illness
Víctor Manuel Román y Reyes	1950	Nicaragua	President	Philadelphia	United States	Complications following stomach cancer surgery
Carlos Delgado Chalbaud	1950	Venezuela	President	Caracas	Venezuela	Assassination – lynching
Enrico Mizzi	1950	Malta	Prime Minister	Valletta	Malta	
Karl Renner	1950	Austria	President	Vienna	Austria	Stroke
Óscar Carmona	1951	Portugal	President	Lisbon	Portugal	Illness – bronchopneumonia
Haj Ali Razmara	1951	Iran	Prime Minister	Tehran	Iran	Assassination – shooting
Liaquat Ali Khan	1951	Pakistan	Prime Minister	Rawalpindi	Pakistan	Assassination – shooting
Sveinn Björnsson	1952	Iceland	President	Reykjavík	Iceland	Illness – heart disease
Khorloogiin Choibalsan	1952	Mongolia	Chairman of the Council of Ministers	Moscow	Soviet Union	Illness – kidney cancer
D. S. Senanayake	1952	Ceylon	Prime Minister	Colombo	Ceylon	Stroke
Chaim Weizmann	1952	Israel	President	Rehovot	Israel	Illness – respiratory inflammation
Adriaan Alberga	1952	Surinam	Prime Minister	Paramaribo	Surinam	
Joseph Stalin	1953	Soviet Union	Chairman of the Council of Ministers	Moscow	Soviet Union	Illness – cerebral haemorrhage
Klement Gottwald	1953	Czechoslovakia	President	Prague	Czechoslovakia	Illness – pneumonia
Gonchigiin Bumtsend	1953	Mongolia	Chairman of the Presidium of the State Little Khural	Ulaanbaatar	Mongolia	
Pierre Dupong	1953	Luxembourg	Prime Minister	Luxembourg	Luxembourg	Heart attack
Getúlio Vargas	1954	Brazil	President	Rio de Janeiro	Brazil	Suicide – gunshot
José Antonio Remón Cantera	1955	Panama	President	Panama City	Panama	Assassination – shooting
Hans Hedtoft	1955	Denmark	Prime Minister	Stockholm	Sweden	Heart attack
Alexandros Papagos	1955	Greece	Prime Minister	Athens	Greece	Illness – lung haemorrhage and heart failure
Bolesław Bierut	1956	Poland	General Secretary of the United Workers' Party	Moscow	Soviet Union	Heart attack
Anastasio Somoza García	1956	Nicaragua	President	Ancón	Panama	Complications from gunshot wound
Theodor Körner	1957	Austria	President	Vienna	Austria	Heart attack
Ramón Magsaysay	1957	Philippines	President	Balamban	Philippines	Accident – plane crash
Carlos Castillo Armas	1957	Guatemala	President	Guatemala City	Guatemala	Assassination – shooting
Antonín Zápotocký	1957	Czechoslovakia	President	Prague	Czechoslovakia	Heart attack
Petru Groza	1958	Romania	President of the Presidium of the Great National Assembly	Bucharest	Romania	Complications following stomach surgery
Johannes Gerhardus Strijdom	1958	South Africa	Prime Minister	Cape Town	South Africa	Illness – heart disease
Daniel Ouezzin Coulibaly	1958	Upper Volta	President of the Government Council	Paris	France	Illness
Markus Feldmann	1958	Switzerland	Member of the Federal Council	Bern	Switzerland	Illness – heart failure
Georgi Damyanov	1958	Bulgaria	Chairman of the Presidium of the National Assembly	Sofia	Bulgaria	
Pierre Frieden	1959	Luxembourg	Prime Minister	Zürich	Switzerland	
Barthélemy Boganda	1959	Central African Republic	Prime Minister	Boda	Central African Republic	Accident – plane crash
S. W. R. D. Bandaranaike	1959	Ceylon	Prime Minister	Colombo	Ceylon	Assassination – shooting
Ernest George Jansen	1959	South Africa	Governor-General	Pretoria	South Africa	Illness – pneumonia
H. C. Hansen	1960	Denmark	Prime Minister	Copenhagen	Denmark	Illness – cancer
Hazza' al-Majali	1960	Jordan	Prime Minister	Amman	Jordan	Assassination – bombing
Wilhelm Pieck	1960	German Democratic Republic	President	Berlin	German Democratic Republic	Heart attack
Abebe Aregai	1960	Ethiopia	Prime Minister	Addis Ababa	Ethiopia	Assassination – shooting
William Morrison	1961	Australia	Governor-General	Canberra	Australia	Illness – pulmonary embolism
Rafael Trujillo	1961	Dominican Republic	Generalissimo	Ciudad Trujillo	Dominican Republic	Assassination – shooting
Nicola Canali	1961	Vatican City/Holy See	President of the Governorate & President of the Pontifical Commission	Vatican City/Holy See		Illness – pneumonia
Louis Rwagasore	1961	Burundi	Prime Minister	Bujumbura	Burundi	Assassination – shooting
Saftar Jafarov	1961	Azerbaijan SSR	Chairman of the Presidium of the Supreme Soviet	Baku	USSR	Illness – cardiovascular disease
Sylvanus Olympio	1963	Togo	President	Lomé	Togo	Assassination – shooting
Tupua Tamasese Meaʻole	1963	Western Samoa	O le Ao o le Malo	Apia	Western Samoa	Illness
Yitzhak Ben-Zvi	1963	Israel	President	Jerusalem	Israel	Illness – cancer
Ngo Dinh Diem	1963	South Vietnam	President	Saigon	South Vietnam	Assassination – shooting
John F. Kennedy	1963	United States	President	Dallas	United States	Assassination – shooting
Sarit Thanarat	1963	Thailand	Prime Minister	Bangkok	Thailand	Illness – heart and liver disease
Jigme Palden Dorji	1964	Bhutan	Prime Minister	Phuntsholing	Bhutan	Assassination – shooting
Dimitar Ganev	1964	Bulgaria	Chairman of the Presidium of the National Assembly	Sofia	Bulgaria	
Milton Margai	1964	Sierra Leone	Prime Minister	Freetown	Sierra Leone	Illness
Jawaharlal Nehru	1964	India	Prime Minister	New Delhi	India	Internal haemorrhage, stroke, and heart attack
Aleksander Zawadzki	1964	Poland	Chairman of the Council of State	Warsaw	Poland	Illness – cancer
Otto Grotewohl	1964	German Democratic Republic	Chairman of the Council of Ministers	Berlin	German Democratic Republic	Illness – brain haemorrhage
Slobodan Penezić	1964	SR Serbia	President of the Executive Council	Šopić	Yugoslavia	Accident – car crash
Pierre Ngendandumwe	1965	Burundi	Prime Minister	Bujumbura	Burundi	Assassination – shooting
Hassan Ali Mansur	1965	Iran	Prime Minister	Tehran	Iran	Complications from gunshot wound
Luis Giannattasio	1965	Uruguay	President	Punta del Este	Uruguay	Heart attack
Adolf Schärf	1965	Austria	President	Vienna	Austria	Illness – influenza and liver disease
Gheorghe Gheorghiu-Dej	1965	Romania	President of the State Council	Bucharest	Romania	Illness – lung cancer
Hasan Brkić	1965	SR Bosnia and Herzegovina	President of the Executive Council	Sarajevo	Yugoslavia	
Lal Bahadur Shastri	1966	India	Prime Minister	Tashkent	Soviet Union	Heart attack (Note: Although Shastri's death was officially ruled a heart attack, several of his supporters and close relatives have suggested foul play and alleged that he was poisoned.)
Abubakar Tafawa Balewa	1966	Nigeria	Prime Minister	Lagos	Nigeria	Assassination – shooting
Chris Soumokil	1966	South Maluku	President	Ubi Island	Indonesia	Execution by firing squad
Abdul Salam Arif	1966	Iraq	President	Al Nashwa	Iraq	Accident – plane crash
Johnson Aguiyi-Ironsi	1966	Nigeria	Head of State	Lagelu	Nigeria	Assassination – shooting
René Schick	1966	Nicaragua	President	Managua	Nicaragua	Heart attack
Hendrik Verwoerd	1966	South Africa	Prime Minister	Cape Town	South Africa	Assassination – stabbing
Georges Vanier	1967	Canada	Governor General	Ottawa	Canada	Heart attack
Donald Burns Sangster	1967	Jamaica	Prime Minister	Montreal	Canada	Illness – subarachnoid haemorrhage
Léon M'ba	1967	Gabon	President	Paris	France	Illness – cancer
Óscar Diego Gestido	1967	Uruguay	President	Montevideo	Uruguay	Heart attack
Harold Holt	1967	Australia	Prime Minister	Cheviot Beach	Australia	Disappeared; presumed drowning
Peter Mohr Dam	1968	Faroe Islands	Prime Minister	Tórshavn	Faroe Islands	
Levi Eshkol	1969	Israel	Prime Minister	Jerusalem	Israel	Heart attack
René Barrientos	1969	Bolivia	President	Arque	Bolivia	Accident – helicopter crash
Zakir Husain	1969	India	President	New Delhi	India	Heart attack
Ho Chi Minh	1969	North Vietnam	Chairman of the Workers' Party and President	Hanoi	North Vietnam	Heart attack
Abdirashid Ali Shermarke	1969	Somali Republic	President	Las Anod	Somali Republic	Assassination – shooting
David Rose	1969	Guyana	Governor-General	London	United Kingdom	Accident – crushed
Artur da Costa e Silva	1969	Brazil	President	Rio de Janeiro	Brazil	Heart attack
Saïd Mohamed Cheikh	1970	Comoros	President of the Government Council	Soavinandriana	Madagascar	Heart attack
Bjarni Benediktsson	1970	Iceland	Prime Minister	Þingvellir	Iceland	Accident – fire
Gamal Abdel Nasser	1970	Egypt	President and Prime Minister	Cairo	Egypt	Heart attack
Yusof bin Ishak	1970	Singapore	President	Singapore		Heart attack
François Duvalier	1971	Haiti	President for life	Port-au-Prince	Haiti	Illness – diabetes and heart disease
William Tubman	1971	Liberia	President	London	United Kingdom	Complications following prostate surgery
Wasfi al-Tal	1971	Jordan	Prime Minister	Cairo	Egypt	Assassination – shooting
Abeid Karume	1972	Zanzibar	President	Zanzibar City	Zanzibar	Assassination – shooting
Jamsrangiin Sambuu	1972	Mongolia	Chairman of the Presidium of the People's Great Khural	Ulaanbaatar	Mongolia	Illness – cancer
Leonard Williams	1972	Mauritius	Governor-General	Port Louis	Mauritius	Heart attack
Richard Sharples	1973	Bermuda	Governor	Hamilton	Bermuda	Assassination – shooting
Walter Ulbricht	1973	German Democratic Republic	Chairman of the State Council	Templin	German Democratic Republic	Illness – heart failure
Salvador Allende	1973	Chile	President	Santiago	Chile	Suicide – gunshot (Note: The exact circumstances of Allende's death were for long a subject of controversy, as it was disputed whether he had died by suicide or been assassinated by the Chilean Armed Forces while defending the presidential palace in Santiago during the 1973 Chilean coup d'état. In 2011, a Chilean court authorized the exhumation and autopsy of Allende's remains. A team of international experts concluded that Allende had shot himself with an AK-47 assault rifle, which seems to have put the controversy surrounding his death to rest.)
Luis Carrero Blanco	1973	Spain	Prime Minister	Madrid	Spain	Assassination – bombing
Franz Jonas	1974	Austria	President	Vienna	Austria	Illness – stomach cancer
Georges Pompidou	1974	France	President (also Co-Prince of Andorra)	Paris	France	Illness – Waldenström's macroglobulinemia
Juan Perón	1974	Argentina	President	Buenos Aires	Argentina	Illness – heart and kidney failure
Norman Eric Kirk	1974	New Zealand	Prime Minister	Wellington	New Zealand	Illness – heart failure
Erskine Childers	1974	Ireland	President	Dublin	Ireland	Heart attack
Richard Ratsimandrava	1975	Madagascar	President	Antananarivo	Madagascar	Assassination – shooting
Chiang Kai-shek	1975	Republic of China	President	Taipei	Republic of China	Heart attack
François Tombalbaye	1975	Chad	President and Prime Minister	N'Djamena	Chad	Assassination – shooting
Long Boret	1975	Khmer Republic	Prime Minister	Phnom Penh	Khmer Republic	Execution by firing squad
Mataʻafa Faumuina Mulinuʻu II	1975	Western Samoa	Prime Minister	Apia	Western Samoa	
Sheikh Mujibur Rahman	1975	Bangladesh	President	Dhaka	Bangladesh	Assassination – shooting
Francisco Franco	1975	Spain	Head of State (Caudillo)	Madrid	Spain	Illness – complications of heart disease, kidney failure and gastric haemorrhage
Zhou Enlai	1976	China	Premier	Beijing	China	Illness – bladder cancer
Abdul Razak Hussein	1976	Malaysia	Prime Minister	London	United Kingdom	Illness – leukemia
Murtala Mohammed	1976	Nigeria	Head of the Federal Military Government	Lagos	Nigeria	Assassination – shooting
El-Ouali Mustapha Sayed	1976	Sahrawi Arab Democratic Republic	President	Inchiri	Mauritania	Killed in action
Zhu De	1976	China	Chairman of the Standing Committee of the National People's Congress	Beijing	China	
Joël Rakotomalala	1976	Madagascar	Prime Minister	Antsirabe	Madagascar	Accident – helicopter crash
Arleigh Winston Scott	1976	Barbados	Governor-General	St. Michael	Barbados	Heart attack
Mao Zedong	1976	China	Chairman of the Central Committee	Beijing	China	Heart attack
Džemal Bijedić	1977	Yugoslavia	President of the Federal Executive Council	Kreševo	Yugoslavia	Accident – plane crash
Tafari Benti	1977	Ethiopia	Chairman of the Provisional Military Administrative Council	Addis Ababa	Ethiopia	Assassination – shooting
Fakhruddin Ali Ahmed	1977	India	President	New Delhi	India	Heart attack
Marien Ngouabi	1977	Congo-Brazzaville	President	Brazzaville	Republic of the Congo	Assassination – shooting
Makarios III	1977	Cyprus	President	Nicosia	Cyprus	Heart attack
Ibrahim al-Hamdi	1977	North Yemen	President	Sanaa	North Yemen	Assassination – shooting
Mohammed Daoud Khan	1978	Afghanistan	President	Kabul	Afghanistan	Assassination – shooting
Robert Llewellyn Bradshaw	1978	Saint Christopher-Nevis-Anguilla	Premier	Basseterre	Saint Christopher-Nevis-Anguilla	Illness – prostate cancer
Ahmad al-Ghashmi	1978	North Yemen	President	Sanaa	North Yemen	Assassination – bombing
Salim Rubai Ali	1978	South Yemen	President	Aden	South Yemen	Assassination – shooting
Francisco Mendes	1978	Guinea-Bissau	Prime Minister	Bissau	Guinea-Bissau	Accident – car crash
Nico Diederichs	1978	South Africa	State President	Cape Town	South Africa	Heart attack
Jomo Kenyatta	1978	Kenya	President	Mombasa	Kenya	Heart attack
John Wrathall	1978	Rhodesia	President	Salisbury	Rhodesia	Heart attack
Botha Sigcau	1978	Transkei	President	Umtata	South Africa	Heart attack
Houari Boumediene	1978	Algeria	President	Algiers	Algeria	Illness – Waldenström's macroglobulinemia
Milo Butler	1979	Bahamas	Governor-General	Nassau	Bahamas	Illness
Jean-Marie Villot	1979	Vatican City/Holy See	Cardinal Secretary of State	Vatican City/Holy See		Illness – bronchopneumonia
Mashiur Rahman	1979	Bangladesh	Chief Minister	Dhaka	Bangladesh	Heart attack
Paul Southwell	1979	Saint Christopher-Nevis-Anguilla	Premier	Castries	Saint Lucia	Heart attack
Ahmed Ould Bouceif	1979	Mauritania	Prime Minister	Off the coast of Dakar	Senegal	Accident – plane crash
Agostinho Neto	1979	Angola	President	Moscow	Soviet Union	Illness – pancreatic cancer
Maphevu Dlamini	1979	Swaziland	Prime Minister	Mbabane	Swaziland	
Park Chung Hee	1979	South Korea	President	Seoul	South Korea	Assassination – shooting
Hafizullah Amin	1979	Afghanistan	General Secretary of the People's Democratic Party of Afghanistan, Chairman of the Presidium of the Revolutionary Council and Chairman of the Council of Ministers	Kabul	Afghanistan	Assassination – shooting
Tôn Đức Thắng	1980	Vietnam	President	Hanoi	Vietnam	Heart attack
William Tolbert	1980	Liberia	President	Monrovia	Liberia	Assassination – shooting
Josip Broz Tito	1980	Yugoslavia	Leader of the League of Communists of Yugoslavia and President	Ljubljana	Yugoslavia	Illness – heart failure
J. A. G. S. McCartney	1980	Turks and Caicos Islands	Chief Minister	Vineland	United States	Accident – plane crash
Masayoshi Ōhira	1980	Japan	Prime Minister	Tokyo	Japan	Heart attack
Seretse Khama	1980	Botswana	President	Gaborone	Botswana	Illness – pancreatic cancer
Abdelhamid Sharaf	1980	Jordan	Prime Minister	Amman	Jordan	Heart attack
Francisco Sá Carneiro	1980	Portugal	Prime Minister	Loures	Portugal	Accident – plane crash (Note: It has long been suggested that the crash that killed Sá Carneiro was not accidental, with multiple parliamentary inquiries having been made into the case. In two of these, carried out in the 1990s and 2004, investigators claimed to have found evidence of an explosive device hidden inside the aircraft. In 2011, then-Prime Minister Pedro Passos Coelho noted that no categorical conclusion had been reached on the cause of the plane crash.)
Sultan Ibraimov	1980	Kyrgyz SSR	Chairman of the Council of Ministers	Cholpon-Ata	USSR	Assassination – shooting
Eric Williams	1981	Trinidad and Tobago	Prime Minister	Port of Spain	Trinidad and Tobago	
Benjamin Henry Sheares	1981	Singapore	President	Singapore		Cerebral haemorrhage
Jaime Roldós Aguilera	1981	Ecuador	President	Celica	Ecuador	Accident – plane crash (Note: Although the plane crash was ruled accidental, it has been suggested that Roldós – a firm supporter of human rights known for his opposition to Operation Condor – was the victim of an assassination. Multiple investigations were made into the crash, none of them being able to determine a definite cause; in relation to the latest investigation, carried out in 2015–16, it was found that several previously classified documents on the case had been destroyed, and that several parts of the remains of the aircraft had not been found.)
Ziaur Rahman	1981	Bangladesh	President	Chittagong	Bangladesh	Assassination – shooting
Omar Torrijos	1981	Panama	Maximum Leader of the Panamanian Revolution	Penonomé	Panama	Accident – plane crash
Mohammad-Ali Rajai	1981	Iran	President	Tehran	Iran	Assassination – bombing
Mohammad-Javad Bahonar	1981	Iran	Prime Minister	Tehran	Iran	Assassination – bombing
Anwar Sadat	1981	Egypt	President and Prime Minister	Cairo	Egypt	Assassination – shooting
Mehmet Shehu	1981	Albania	Chairman of the Council of Ministers	Tirana	Albania	Suicide – gunshot (Note: Although Shehu's cause of death was given as suicide brought on by depression, it is also possible that he was murdered after falling out of favor with Enver Hoxha.)
Antonio Guzmán Fernández	1982	Dominican Republic	President	Santo Domingo	Dominican Republic	Suicide – gunshot
Bachir Gemayel	1982	Lebanon	President-elect	Beirut	Lebanon	Assassination – bombing
Leonid Brezhnev	1982	Soviet Union	General Secretary of the Communist Party and Chairman of the Presidium of the Supreme Soviet	Zarechye	Soviet Union	Heart attack
Willi Ritschard	1983	Switzerland	Member of the Federal Council	Grenchenberg	Switzerland	Illness – heart failure
Deighton Lisle Ward	1984	Barbados	Governor-General		Barbados	
Yuri Andropov	1984	Soviet Union	General Secretary of the Communist Party and Chairman of the Presidium of the Supreme Soviet	Moscow	Soviet Union	Illness – kidney failure
Ahmed Sékou Touré	1984	Guinea	President	Cleveland	United States	Heart attack
Edward Sokoine	1984	Tanzania	Prime Minister	Morogoro	Tanzania	Accident – car crash
Ahmad Fuad Mohieddin	1984	Egypt	Prime Minister	Cairo	Egypt	Heart attack
Indira Gandhi	1984	India	Prime Minister	New Delhi	India	Assassination – shooting
Chan Sy	1984	People's Republic of Kampuchea	Chairman of the Council of Ministers	Moscow	Soviet Union	Heart attack
Konstantin Chernenko	1985	Soviet Union	General Secretary of the Communist Party and Chairman of the Presidium of the Supreme Soviet	Moscow	Soviet Union	Illness – heart failure and emphysema
Tom Adams	1985	Barbados	Prime Minister	Saint Michael	Barbados	Heart attack
Enver Hoxha	1985	Albania	First Secretary of the Party of Labour	Tirana	Albania	Illness – complications from diabetes
Tancredo Neves	1985	Brazil	President-elect	São Paulo	Brazil	Illness – infected leiomyoma (Note: The details surrounding Neves' death are not entirely clear. It was initially reported that he was suffering from temporary acute diverticulitis, a less serious condition, so as not to alarm the public ahead of his inauguration as President. A later report also stated that he had died from systemic inflammatory response syndrome, a condition unknown at the time.)
Haruo Remeliik	1985	Palau	President	Koror	Palau	Assassination – shooting
Forbes Burnham	1985	Guyana	President	Georgetown	Guyana	Heart attack
Seewoosagur Ramgoolam	1985	Mauritius	Governor-General	Port Louis	Mauritius	Illness
Olof Palme	1986	Sweden	Prime Minister	Stockholm	Sweden	Assassination – shooting
Lê Duẩn	1986	Vietnam	General Secretary of the Communist Party	Hanoi	Vietnam	Illness – lung and kidney disease
Samora Machel	1986	Mozambique	President	Mbuzini	South Africa	Accident – plane crash (Note: It has been alleged that the plane crash was not accidental, and that South Africa, which was hostile to Machel's government at the time, was involved. Mozambique and the Soviet Union demanded an onsite investigation at the time, but South Africa, the third member of a tripartite commission formed after the crash, refused.)
Edward Youde	1986	British Hong Kong	Governor	Beijing	China	Heart attack
Errol Barrow	1987	Barbados	Prime Minister	Bridgetown	Barbados	
Rashid Karami	1987	Lebanon	Prime Minister	Beirut	Lebanon	Assassination – bombing
Cedric Phatudi	1987	KaNgwane	Chief Minister	Lebowakgomo	South Africa	Illness – complications from diabetes and bone cancer
Thomas Sankara	1987	Burkina Faso	President	Ouagadougou	Burkina Faso	Assassination – shooting
Seyni Kountché	1987	Niger	President of the Supreme Military Council	Paris	France	Illness – brain tumour
Chiang Ching-kuo	1988	Republic of China	President	Taipei	Republic of China	Heart attack
Phạm Hùng	1988	Vietnam	Prime Minister	Ho Chi Minh City	Vietnam	Heart attack
Patrick Mphephu	1988	Venda	President	Thohoyandou	South Africa	Illness
Muhammad Zia-ul-Haq	1988	Pakistan	President	Bahawalpur	Pakistan	Accident – plane crash
Lazarus Salii	1988	Palau	President	Koror	Palau	Suicide – gunshot
Ruhollah Khomeini	1989	Iran	Supreme Leader	Tehran	Iran	Heart attack
René Moawad	1989	Lebanon	President	Beirut	Lebanon	Assassination – bombing
Ahmed Abdallah	1989	Comoros	President	Moroni	Comoros	Assassination – shooting
Herbert Blaize	1989	Grenada	Prime Minister	St George's	Grenada	Illness – prostate cancer
Ignatius Kilage	1989	Papua New Guinea	Governor-General	Port Moresby	Papua New Guinea	
Samuel Doe	1990	Liberia	President	Monrovia	Liberia	Assassination – torture (Note: Doe was captured and killed by forces of the Independent National Patriotic Front of Liberia, led by Prince Johnson, in the First Liberian Civil War. Prior to his death, Doe was filmed while being questioned and tortured by rebel forces; his exact cause of death is not known for certain, but according to Johnson himself, Doe later died in a bathroom at Johnson's mansion from loss of blood.)
Rashid bin Saeed Al Maktoum	1990	United Arab Emirates	Prime Minister	Dubai	United Arab Emirates	Illness
Nasirdin Isanov	1991	Kyrgyzstan	Prime Minister	Jalal-Abad–Osh Motorway	Kyrgyzstan	Accident – car crash
Artur Mkrtchyan	1992	Artsakh	Chairman of the Supreme Council	Stepanakert	Artsakh/Azerbaijan	Assassination – shooting
Mohamed Boudiaf	1992	Algeria	Chairman of the High Council of State	Annaba	Algeria	Assassination – shooting
Kaysone Phomvihane	1992	Laos	President	Vientiane	Laos	Illness
Robert Rex	1992	Niue	Premier	Alofi	Niue	
Turgut Özal	1993	Turkey	President	Ankara	Turkey	Heart attack (Note: It has been alleged that Özal was actually poisoned by elements of the Turkish "deep state". An investigation of foul play in his death was made in 2012; an exhumation of his remains revealed traces of insecticides, pesticides and radioactive elements. However, prosecutors said the levels of toxins were normal. A trial charging retired army general Levent Ersöz with the murder of Özal began in September 2013; Ersöz was acquitted in November 2014.)
Ranasinghe Premadasa	1993	Sri Lanka	President	Colombo	Sri Lanka	Assassination – bombing
Zhiuli Shartava	1993	Abkhazia	Chairman of the Government	Sukhumi	Abkhazia/Georgia	Assassination – shooting
Melchior Ndadaye	1993	Burundi	President	Bujumbura	Burundi	Assassination – stabbing
Félix Houphouët-Boigny	1993	Ivory Coast	President	Yamoussoukro	Ivory Coast	Illness – prostate cancer
József Antall	1993	Hungary	Prime Minister	Budapest	Hungary	Illness – lymphoma
Penaia Ganilau	1993	Fiji	President	Washington, D.C.	United States	Illness – sepsis
Cyprien Ntaryamira	1994	Burundi	President	Kigali	Rwanda	Assassination – plane shot down
Juvénal Habyarimana	1994	Rwanda	President	Kigali	Rwanda	Assassination – plane shot down
Agathe Uwilingiyimana	1994	Rwanda	Prime Minister	Kigali	Rwanda	Assassination – shooting
Kim Il Sung	1994	North Korea	General Secretary of the Workers' Party and President	Hyangsan	North Korea	Heart attack
Hamilton Lavity Stoutt	1995	British Virgin Islands	Chief Minister	Tortola	British Virgin Islands	
Yitzhak Rabin	1995	Israel	Prime Minister	Tel Aviv	Israel	Assassination – shooting
Nita Barrow	1995	Barbados	Governor-General	Bridgetown	Barbados	
Dzhokhar Dudayev	1996	Chechen Republic of Ichkeria	President	Gekhi-Chu	Chechen Republic of Ichkeria/Russia	Assassination – missile strike
Mohamed Farrah Aidid	1996	Somalia	President (Note: Disputed with Ali Mahdi Muhammad.)	Mogadishu	Somalia	Killed in action
Amata Kabua	1996	Marshall Islands	President	Honolulu	United States	Illness
Cheddi Jagan	1997	Guyana	President	Washington, D.C.	United States	Heart attack
Abdul Rahim Ghafoorzai	1997	Afghanistan	Prime Minister	Bamyan	Afghanistan	Accident – plane crash
Sani Abacha	1998	Nigeria	Chairman of the Provisional Ruling Council	Abuja	Nigeria	Heart attack (Note: Some United States intelligence analysts stated there was evidence Abacha was poisoned. While one U.S. official flatly stated that the rumors were true, two others were quoted as saying the reports on his poisoning did not contain any firm evidence.)
Mohamed Taki Abdoulkarim	1998	Comoros	President	Moroni	Comoros	Heart attack
Jumabek Ibraimov	1999	Kyrgyzstan	Prime Minister	Bishkek	Kyrgyzstan	Illness – stomach cancer
Ibrahim Baré Maïnassara	1999	Niger	President	Niamey	Niger	Assassination – shooting
Vazgen Sargsyan	1999	Armenia	Prime Minister	Yerevan	Armenia	Assassination – shooting
Franjo Tuđman	1999	Croatia	President	Zagreb	Croatia	Illness – stomach cancer, complications from surgery

== 2000–present ==
Name	Year	Country	Title	Place of death		Cause of death
Hafez al-Assad	2000	Syria	President	Damascus	Syria	Heart attack
Rosie Douglas	2000	Dominica	Prime Minister	Portsmouth	Dominica	Heart attack (Note: Although his death was ruled a heart attack, it has been speculated that Douglas was assassinated by some Dominicans, including Douglas' son, Cabral.)
Ionatana Ionatana	2000	Tuvalu	Prime Minister	Funafuti	Tuvalu	Heart attack
Laurent-Désiré Kabila	2001	Democratic Republic of the Congo	President	Kinshasa	Democratic Republic of Congo	Assassination – shooting
Muhammad Haji Ibrahim Egal	2002	Somaliland	President	Pretoria	South Africa	Complications following surgery
Charles Antrobus	2002	Saint Vincent and the Grenadines	Governor-General	Toronto	Canada	Illness
Bernard Dowiyogo	2003	Nauru	President	Washington, D.C.	United States	Complications following heart surgery
Zoran Đinđić	2003	Serbia and Montenegro	Prime Minister	Belgrade	Serbia and Montenegro	Assassination – shooting
Pierre Charles	2004	Dominica	Prime Minister	Roseau	Dominica	Heart attack
Boris Trajkovski	2004	Macedonia	President	Berkovići	Bosnia and Herzegovina	Accident – plane crash
Ezzedine Salim	2004	Iraq	President of the Governing Council	Baghdad	Iraq	Assassination – car bomb
Thomas Klestil	2004	Austria	President	Vienna	Austria	Heart attack or illness – heart failure
Yasser Arafat	2004	Palestine	President	Paris	France	Disputed
Zurab Zhvania	2005	Georgia	Prime Minister	Tbilisi	Georgia	Accident – poisoning (Note: While Zhvania's cause of death was ruled as accidental carbon monoxide poisoning caused by a faulty heater in his apartment, it has been alleged that he was assassinated, including by relatives, and by Georgian ex-President Eduard Shevardnadze.)
Gnassingbé Eyadéma	2005	Togo	President	Near Tunis	Tunisia	Heart attack
Maktoum bin Rashid Al Maktoum	2006	United Arab Emirates	Prime Minister	Gold Coast	Australia	Heart attack
Ibrahim Rugova	2006	Kosovo	President	Pristina	Kosovo	Illness – lung cancer
Saparmurat Niyazov	2006	Turkmenistan	President	Ashgabat	Turkmenistan	Illness – heart failure
Pascal Yoadimnadji	2007	Chad	Prime Minister	Paris	France	Illness – brain haemorrhage
Andranik Margaryan	2007	Armenia	Prime Minister	Yerevan	Armenia	Heart attack
Malietoa Tanumafili II	2007	Samoa	O le Ao o le Malo	Apia	Samoa	Illness – pneumonia
John Compton	2007	Saint Lucia	Prime Minister	Castries	Saint Lucia	Stroke
Soe Win	2007	Myanmar	Prime Minister	Beijing	China	Illness – leukemia
Levy Mwanawasa	2008	Zambia	President	Paris	France	Stroke
Lansana Conté	2008	Guinea	President	Conakry	Guinea	Illness
João Bernardo Vieira	2009	Guinea-Bissau	President	Bissau	Guinea-Bissau	Assassination – shooting
Omar Bongo	2009	Gabon	President	Barcelona	Spain	Heart attack
Lech Kaczyński	2010	Poland	President	Near Smolensk	Russia	Accident – plane crash
Umaru Musa Yar'Adua	2010	Nigeria	President	Abuja	Nigeria	Illness – pericarditis
David Thompson	2010	Barbados	Prime Minister	Saint Philip	Barbados	Illness – pancreatic cancer
Sergey Bagapsh	2011	Abkhazia	President	Moscow	Russia	Illness – heart failure
Muammar Gaddafi	2011	Libya	Brotherly Leader and Guide of the Revolution	Sirte	Libya	Assassination – shooting
Kim Jong Il	2011	North Korea	General Secretary of the Workers' Party	Pyongyang	North Korea	Heart attack
Malam Bacai Sanhá	2012	Guinea-Bissau	President	Paris	France	Illness
Bingu wa Mutharika	2012	Malawi	President	Lilongwe	Malawi	Heart attack
John Atta Mills	2012	Ghana	President	Accra	Ghana	Illness – intracerebral hemorrhage
Meles Zenawi	2012	Ethiopia	Prime Minister	Brussels	Belgium	Illness
Hugo Chávez	2013	Venezuela	President	Caracas	Venezuela	Respiratory failure
Zillur Rahman	2013	Bangladesh	President	Singapore		Illness – lung infection
Michael Sata	2014	Zambia	President	London	United Kingdom	Illness
Mohamed Abdelaziz	2016	Sahrawi Arab Democratic Republic	Secretary General of the Polisario Front; President	Tindouf	Algeria	Illness – lung cancer
Islam Karimov	2016	Uzbekistan	President	Tashkent	Uzbekistan	Illness – multiple organ failure
Michael Ogio	2017	Papua New Guinea	Governor-General	Port Moresby	Papua New Guinea	Illness – multiple organ failure
Baldwin Lonsdale	2017	Vanuatu	President	Port Vila	Vanuatu	Heart attack
Alexander Zakharchenko	2018	Donetsk People's Republic	Head of the Republic and Prime Minister	Donetsk	Donetsk People's Republic/Ukraine	Assassination – bombing
Gennadi Gagulia	2018	Abkhazia	Prime Minister	Miusera	Abkhazia/Georgia	Accident – car crash
Trần Đại Quang	2018	Vietnam	President	Hanoi	Vietnam	Illness – viral disease
Beji Caid Essebsi	2019	Tunisia	President	Tunis	Tunisia	Illness
ʻAkilisi Pōhiva	2019	Tonga	Prime Minister	Auckland	New Zealand	Illness – pneumonia
Pierre Nkurunziza	2020	Burundi	President	Karuzi	Burundi	Illness – cardiac arrest; COVID-19 (suspected)
Amadou Gon Coulibaly	2020	Ivory Coast	Prime Minister	Abidjan	Ivory Coast	Illness – heart disease
Khalifa bin Salman Al Khalifa	2020	Bahrain	Prime Minister	Rochester	United States	Illness
Ambrose Mandvulo Dlamini	2020	Eswatini	Prime Minister	Johannesburg	South Africa	Illness – COVID-19
Hamed Bakayoko	2021	Ivory Coast	Prime Minister	Freiburg im Breisgau	Germany	Illness – cancer
John Magufuli	2021	Tanzania	President	Dar es Salaam	Tanzania	Illness – heart condition
Idriss Déby	2021	Chad	President	Tibesti	Chad	Killed in action
Jovenel Moïse	2021	Haiti	President	Port-au-Prince	Haiti	Assassination – shooting
Khalifa bin Zayed Al Nahyan	2022	United Arab Emirates	President	Abu Dhabi	United Arab Emirates	Illness
Hage Geingob	2024	Namibia	President	Windhoek	Namibia	Illness – cancer
Ebrahim Raisi	2024	Iran	President	Varzaqan	Iran	Accident – helicopter crash
Nguyễn Phú Trọng	2024	Vietnam	General Secretary of the Communist Party	Hanoi	Vietnam	Illness
Didier Guillaume	2025	Monaco	Minister of State	Nice	France	Illness
Ahmed al-Rahawi	2025	Yemen	Prime Minister (Note: Disputed with Salem Saleh bin Braik.)	Sanaa	Yemen	Assassination – airstrike
Ali Khamenei	2026	Iran	Supreme Leader	Tehran	Iran	Assassination – airstrike

== See also ==
- List of assassinated and executed heads of state and government
- List of heads of state and government who took their own lives
- List of heads of state and government who died in aviation accidents and incidents
- List of presidents of the United States who died in office
