= Death and state funeral of Malietoa Tanumafili II =

2007 death and funeral of the O le Ao o le Malo of Samoa

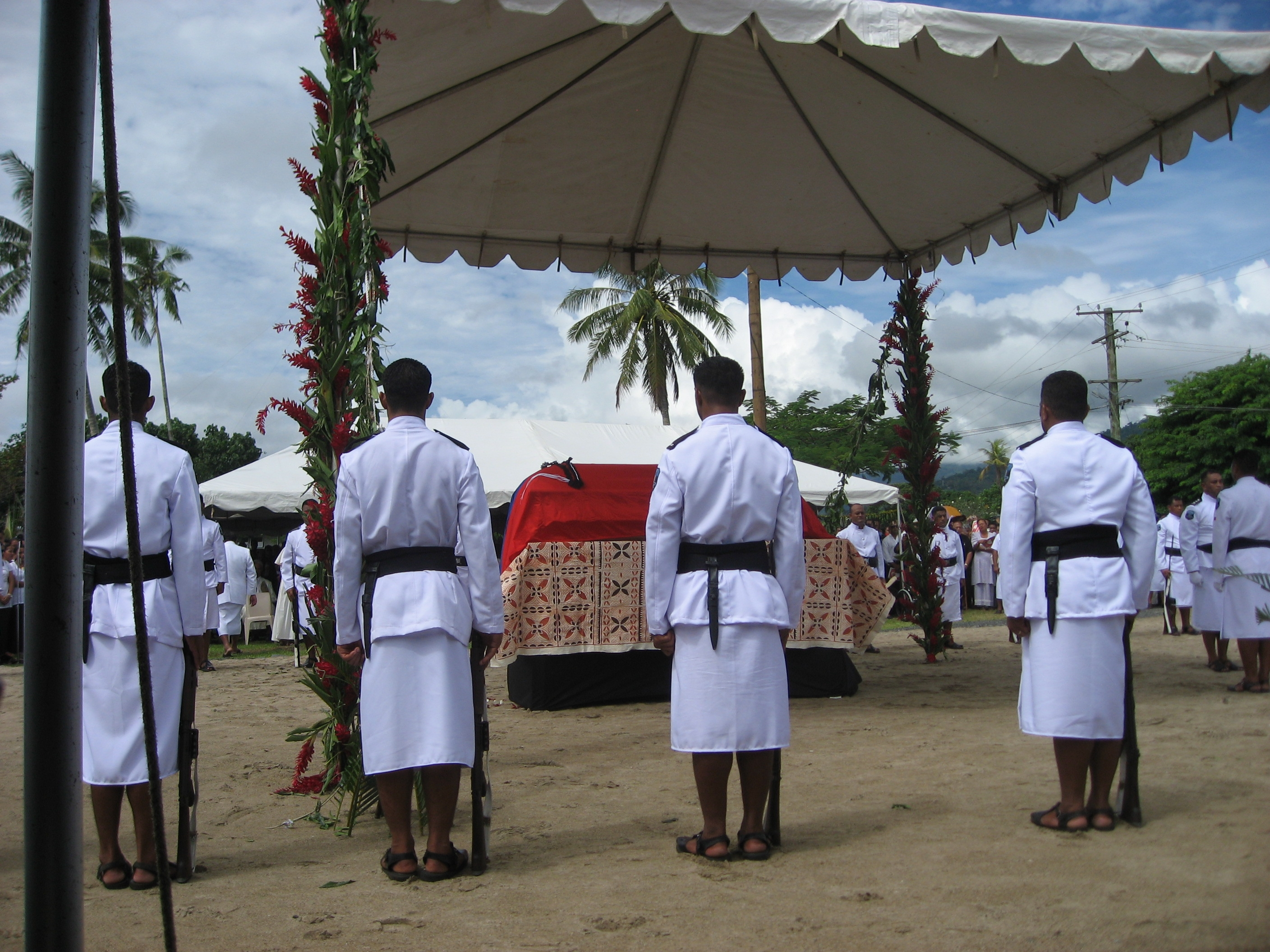
- Malietoa Tanumafili II's coffin lying in state outside parliament
- Date: 11 May 2007, 18:45 (SST) (death); 18 May 2007 (state funeral)
- Location: Motoʻotua, Apia, Samoa (death); Mulinuʻu, Apia, Samoa (lying-in-state and state funeral)

Malietoa Tanumafili II, Samoa's head of state (O le Ao o le Malo) and paramount chief of the Malietoa lineage, died in office on 11 May 2007 at the age of 94. He had served as head of state for 45 years following Samoa's independence in 1962. He was buried on 18 May, following a state funeral which was attended by various Samoan and international dignitaries.

== Illness and death ==
Prior to his death, Malietoa had been treated for pneumonia at the Tupua Tamasese Meaʻole National Hospital in Motoʻotua, near Apia. Prime Minister Tuilaʻepa Saʻilele Malielegaoi visited Malietoa's relatives at the hospital on 10 May 2007, where a church service had been conducted. He died at 18:45 on 11 May (UTC−11:00). Sources close to him said that he died as a result of "chest complications".

His death was announced on state broadcaster SBC TV1 by Secretary of State Vaʻasatia Poloma Komiti, who added that Tuilaʻepa would address the nation later in the day. Malietoa was survived by two sons and two daughters.

At the time of his death, Malietoa was the oldest incumbent state leader and the third longest serving current head of state after King Bhumibol Adulyadej of Thailand and Queen Elizabeth II. His death was described by The New Zealand Herald as "the latest passing of a generation of South Pacific leaders", following the deaths of Fiji's first prime minister Ratu Sir Kamisese Mara in 2004, Māori queen Dame Te Atairangikaahu and King Tāufaʻāhau Tupou IV of Tonga in 2006, and Tomasi Kulimoetoke II, king of the French chiefdom of Uvea, five days before Malietoa's death.

== State mourning ==
Samoa entered a state of official mourning from the time of the Malietoa's death until his state funeral, during which all Samoan flags were lowered to half-mast. Many Samoans wore white and black as a sign of respect for the Malietoa, in accordance with tradition. The government encouraged traditional Samoan dress for the funeral, specifically "a black lavalava or sulu and a white top with traditional elei patterns." Samoans were also asked to include the teuila flower, the national flower of Samoa, with their mourning attire.

== State funeral ==
Malietoa's remains were taken from a private funeral home to his residence at Faʻatoʻialemanu on 16 May, which marked the beginning of his funeral proceedings. Members of his family attended a special private service that night. His coffin, draped in the Samoan flag, was then moved to the grounds of the Legislative Assembly building in Mulinuʻu, near Apia, to lie in state on 17 May.

The state funeral was held on 18 May in Mulinuʻu, in the form of an interdenominational service which combined foreign and Samoan cultural protocol. It included eulogies by Prime Minister Tuilaʻepa and Malietoa's son. Following the ceremony, the coffin was taken by a police national guard for burial at his family's mausoleum. The date of the funeral was declared a national holiday.

The New Zealand delegation at the funeral was led by Governor-General Anand Satyanand, Prime Minister Helen Clark and Māori King Tūheitia Paki. Fijian foreign minister Ratu Epeli Nailatikau was allowed to transit through New Zealand to get to the funeral, bypassing an entry ban on officials from the military regime in Fiji at the time. Other foreign guests included King George Tupou V of Tonga, Governor-General of Australia Michael Jeffery, American Samoan Governor Togiola Tulafono, and officials from Tuvalu, Niue, Japan, Canada, China, South Korea and French Polynesia. The United States was represented by the Deputy Assistant Secretary of the Interior for Insular Affairs, Papaliʻi David Cohen, whose matai title was conferred by Malietoa.

== Succession ==
Malietoa's death created a vacancy in the office of O le Ao o le Malo; the Council of Deputies temporarily assumed acting duties until a future election to determine a permanent successor. On 17 May, the speaker of the Legislative Assembly, Tolo Fua Falemoe, announced that nomination forms had been sent to its members with a deadline of thirty-five days from notification. Two candidates who were seen as likely to succeed Malietoa were fellow paramount chiefs Tui Ātua Tupua Tamasese Efi and Tuimalealiʻifano Vaʻaletoʻa Sualauvi II, both at the time members of the Council of Deputies. On 16 June, Tui Ātua, the sole nominee, was unanimously elected by the Legislative Assembly.

Following an extended period of deliberation, the Malietoa title passed to his eldest surviving son, Malietoa Moli II, having formally being decided by a court ruling in 2017. The title was initially bestowed on him unilaterally shortly after Tanumafili II's death, but this was later ruled illegal by the Lands and Titles Court.

== Reactions ==
- (Fiji) Fijian foreign affairs minister Ratu Epeli Nailatikau described the Malietoa's death as "a loss of the entire Pacific, not only Samoa."
- (Federated States of Micronesia) Newly elected Micronesian President Manny Mori sent a letter to Samoan Prime Minister Tuilaʻepa stating that Malietoa Tanumafili II was a "great leader and pioneer of Samoa", whose "wisdom, leadership and dedication contributed to the forgoing and eventual inception of the Samoan Nation."
- New Zealand Prime Minister Helen Clark said: "Through his long reign as Head of State, Malietoa represented Samoa with wisdom, humour and insight. [...] It is significant that New Zealand has a Treaty of Friendship with only one country – Samoa – and our shared unique relationship was due in no small part to Malietoa's influence as a father of modern Samoa. New Zealanders of Samoan descent, together with their palagi counterparts, will be thinking of Samoa, at this sad time."
  - Tino Pereira, a spokesperson for the Samoan Council in Wellington, described the Malietoa as "a founding father of Samoan independence."
- The United States Department of State released a statement: "The United States extends its condolences to His Highness Malietoa's two sons and two daughters and the people of Samoa during this time of sorrow. His Highness Malietoa played an important and valued role in the history of his country. He was one of Samoa's founding fathers and served as Head of State since Samoa gained independence in 1962. He also led by example, working to promote democracy and prosperity in his country and throughout the Pacific. As Samoans mourn the loss of their beloved leader, the United States remains committed to maintaining the strong bilateral relationship cultivated through the partnership with His Highness and the Samoan Government."
  - (American Samoa) American Samoan Governor Togiola Tulafono extended his condolences. Many American Samoans considered Malietoa to be "the father of the two Samoas".
- The United Nations General Assembly observed a moment of silence on 16 May in honour of Malietoa.
