= 2007 Samoan o le Ao o le Malo election =

Election of the head of state of Samoa

2007 Samoan o le ao o le Malo election
- 16 June 2007
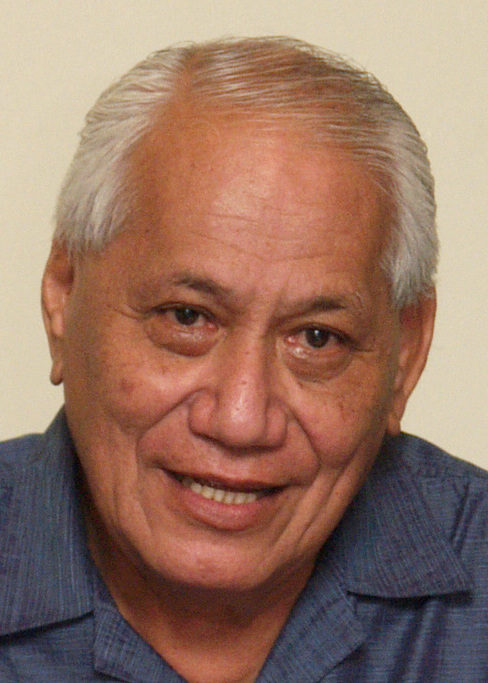
Nominee	Tui Ātua Tupua Tamasese Efi
Party	Independent
Electoral vote	Uncontested
O le Ao o le Malo before election
Council of Deputies
(Acting)
Elected O le Ao o le Malo
Tui Ātua Tupua Tamasese Efi
Independent

An indirect election was held in Samoa to elect the O le Ao o le Malo (head of state) on 16 June 2007 after the death of the country's head of state for four and a half decades, Malietoa Tanumafili II, in May 2007. Former Prime Minister Tui Ātua Tupua Tamasese Efi was elected unopposed by the 49-member strong parliament. This election was the first to occur for an O le Ao o le Malo since Samoa gained independence in 1962.

== Background ==
The O le Ao o le Malo is the head of state of Samoa, an office which was established on its independence in 1962. The position is mostly ceremonial. Although power is vested in the prime minister and their cabinet, the head of state can dissolve the Legislative Assembly, and no act can become law without their signature.

The constitution, drafted in 1960 and adopted upon independence, stated that two paramount chiefs, Malietoa Tanumafili II and Tupua Tamasese Meaʻole, representatives of "two of the four main family lineages", would serve as co-heads of state for life, and that the Legislative Assembly would elect successive heads of state for five-year terms.

The election was triggered by the death of Malietoa Tanumafili II in May 2007, who served as the sole head of state of Samoa since Tupua Tamasese predeceased him in 1963. Per the Constitution, the Council of Deputies, whose members were Tui Ātua Tupua Tamasese Efi and Tuimalealiʻifano Vaʻaletoʻa Sualauvi II, performed the functions of head of state until a successor would be elected.

== Eligibility ==
Parliament elects the head of state for a five-year term. According to the Constitution, the legislative assembly may only nominate one individual to be head of state. For an individual to qualify to be head of state, they must be a Samoan citizen, be eligible to run for parliament and not have previously been removed from the office.

== Election ==
Tui Ātua was the sole nominee elected as head of state. A former prime minister and son of Tupua Tamasese Meaʻole, he was previously the opposition leader and became a member of the Council of Deputies in 2004. He was sworn in at parliament for his first term on 20 June 2007.
