= 1935 Western Samoan general election =

General elections were held in Western Samoa on 1 November 1935.

== Electoral system ==
Two Europeans were elected from a single two-seat constituency. Voting was restricted to Europeans or Samoan-Europeans owning property worth at least £200 or with an annual income of at least £200. Of the European/Samoan-European population of 3,000, only 134 people were registered to vote, down from 172 in the 1932 elections.

== Campaign ==
Four candidates contested the two available seats. Incumbents and brothers-in-law Irving Carruthers and Alan Cobcroft both ran for re-election, alongside businessman Alfred Smyth and Charles Dawson, the territory's only private doctor. Cobcroft was supported by the Planters' Association.

== Results ==
Smyth (82 votes) and Carruthers (65 votes) were elected, with Cobcroft, who finished last of the four candidates with fewer than 50 votes, surprisingly unseated.

== Aftermath ==
Following the Goodwill Mission by the New Zealand government in 1936, the number of nominated Samoan members was increased from two to four. Tuala Tulo and Tupua Tamasese Meaʻole were appointed in addition to Malietoa Tanumafili I and Mata'afa Muliufi, taking their seats in December that year.

Malietoa resigned from the Council in July 1937 to become a Fautua. He was replaced by Namulauulu Tivoli.
