= 1938 Western Samoan general election =

General elections were held in Western Samoa on 26 November 1938.

== Electoral system ==
Two Europeans were elected from a single two-seat constituency. Following the passing of the Samoa Legislative Council Elective Membership Amendment Order, 1938 by the New Zealand government, universal suffrage was introduced for the European and mixed European-Samoan population aged 21 or over, having previously been restricted to those with property worth at least £200 or with an annual income of at least £200. The number of registered voters increased from 134 in the 1935 elections to 705.

== Results ==
| Candidate | Party | Votes | % | Notes |
|---|---|---|---|---|
| Olaf Frederick Nelson | Independent | 338 | 29.52 | Elected |
| Charles Dawson | Independent | 274 | 23.93 | Elected |
| Alfred Smyth | United Progressive Party | 216 | 18.86 | Unseated |
| Amando Stowers | Labour Party | 154 | 13.45 | |
| E.T. Pleasants | Independent | 135 | 11.79 | |
| Percy Glover | Independent | 28 | 2.45 | |
| Total | | 1,145 | 100.00 | |
Source: New Zealand Herald

=== Nominated Members ===
| Position | Member |
|---|---|
| Administrator | Alfred Turnbull |
| Chief Medical Officer | Monoghan |
| Crown Solicitor | J. Herd |
| Director of Education | A. McKenzie |
| Native Affairs | C.C. McKay |
| Secretary to the Administration | E.C. Quin |
| Treasurer | T.C. Malone |
| Samoan nominees | Namulau'ula Tivoli |
| Samoan nominees | Tupua Tamasese Meaʻole |
| Samoan nominees | Tuala Tulo |
Source: New Zealand Herald

In January 1939, Faalavaau Galu and Asiata Muese were appointed as Samoan nominated members. Muese was removed in August 1940 when Tuisila Faitala, Alipia Siaosi and Manuleleua Siavao were appointed, with Tupua becoming a Fautua.
