= List of state leaders by age =

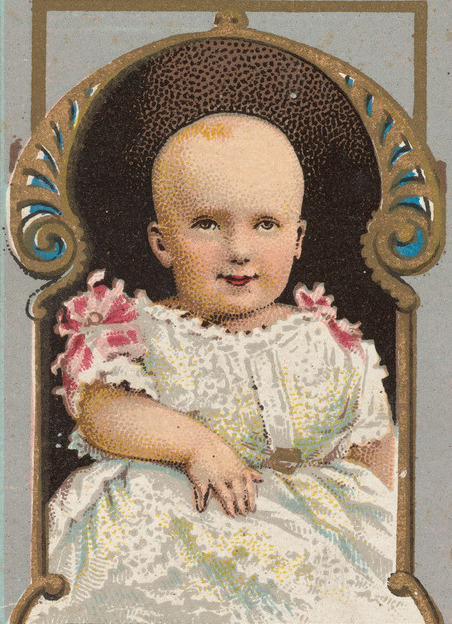
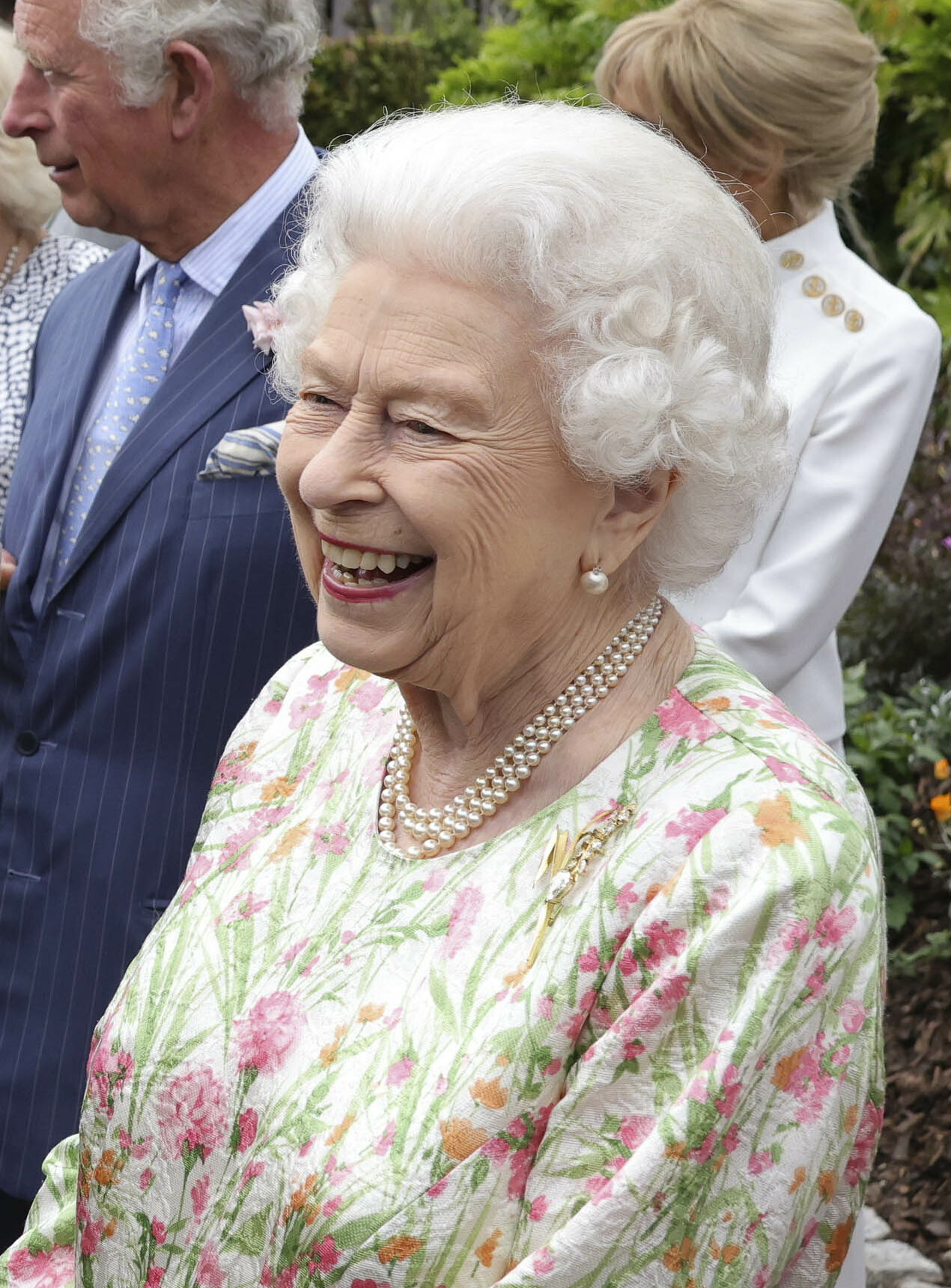
Since 1800, the youngest serving state leader was Alfonso XIII, who became King of Spain at the moment of his birth, while the oldest was 96-year-old Elizabeth II, Queen of the United Kingdom and the other Commonwealth realms.

This article contains various lists of state leaders organized by age, defined as heads of state and/or heads of government.

== Oldest serving state leaders ==
=== Top ten currently serving ===
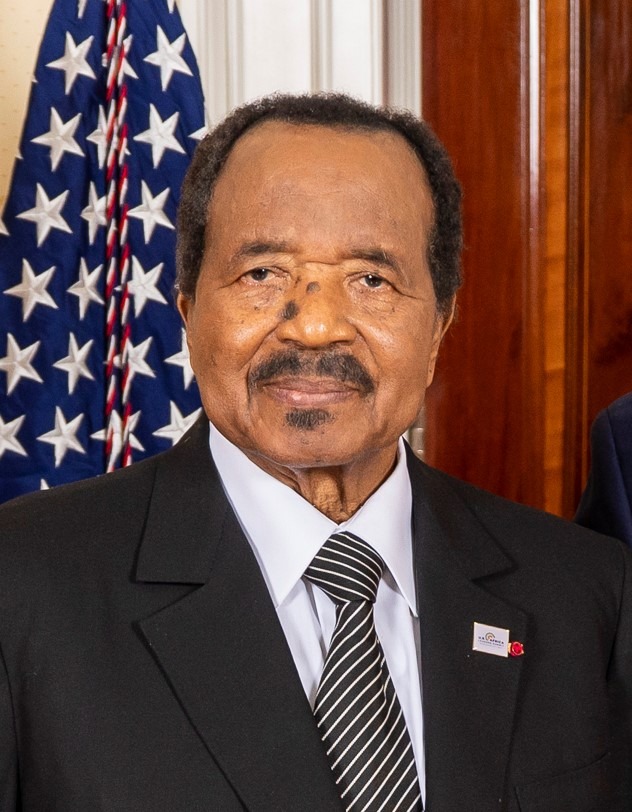
Paul Biya, currently the oldest serving state leader

People currently serving as head of state and/or head of government, a party leader of a one-party state, or a representative of a head of state.

Rank	Name	State	Position	Assumed office	Born	Age
1	Paul Biya	Cameroon	President	1982	13 February 1933	93 years, 279 days
2	Mahmoud Abbas	Palestine	President	2005	15 November 1935	91 years, 4 days
3	Salman bin Abdulaziz al Saud	Saudi Arabia	King	2015	31 December 1935	90 years, 323 days
4	Jean-Lucien Savi de Tové	Togo	President	2025	7 May 1939	87 years, 196 days
5	Peter Mutharika	Malawi	President	2025	18 July 1940	86 years, 124 days
6	Mishal Al-Sabah	Kuwait	Emir	2023	27 September 1940	86 years, 53 days
7	Sergio Mattarella	Italy	President	2015	23 July 1941	85 years, 119 days
8	Alassane Ouattara	Ivory Coast	President	2010	1 January 1942	84 years, 322 days
9	Teodoro Obiang Nguema Mbasogo	Equatorial Guinea	President	1982	5 June 1942	84 years, 167 days
10	Emmerson Mnangagwa	Zimbabwe	President	2017	15 September 1942	84 years, 65 days

=== Top ten of all time ===
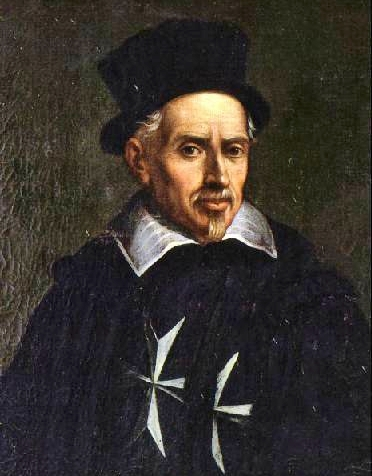
Giovanni Paolo Lascaris, the oldest serving state leader of all time whose age is fully verifiable

Currently in office
Currently living

Rank	Name	State	Position	Last year in office (reason term ended)	Age at end
1	Giovanni Paolo Lascaris	Hospitaller Malta	Grand Master of the Knights Hospitaller	1657 (death)	97 years, 47 days
2	Elizabeth II	United Kingdom; Other Commonwealth realms	Queen	2022 (death)	96 years, 140 days
3	Prem Tinsulanonda	Thailand	Regent	2016 (tenure ended)	96 years, 97 days
4	George Tupou I	Tonga	King	1893 (death)	95 years, 76 days
5	Mahathir Mohamad	Malaysia	Prime Minister	2020 (resigned)	94 years, 235 days
6	Nicolò da Ponte	Venice	Doge of Venice	1585 (death)	94 years, 196 days
7	Malietoa Tanumafili II	Samoa	O le Ao o le Malo	2007 (death)	94 years, 127 days
8	Paul Biya	Cameroon	President	Incumbent	93 years, 279 days
9	Robert Mugabe	Zimbabwe	President	2017 (resigned)	93 years, 273 days
10	Beji Caid Essebsi	Tunisia	President	2019 (death)	92 years, 238 days

== Youngest serving state leaders ==
=== Top ten currently serving ===
Balendra Shah, currently the youngest serving state leader

Rank	Name	State	Position	Assumed office	Born	Age
1	Balendra Shah	Nepal	Prime Minister	2026	27 April 1990	36 years, 206 days
2	Kristrún Frostadóttir	Iceland	Prime Minister	2024	12 May 1988	38 years, 191 days
3	Ibrahim Traoré	Burkina Faso	President of the Patriotic Movement for Safeguard and Restoration, Interim President	2022	14 March 1988	38 years, 250 days
4	Daniel Noboa	Ecuador	President	2023	30 November 1987	38 years, 354 days
5	Milojko Spajić	Montenegro	Prime Minister	2023	24 September 1987	39 years, 56 days
6	Rob Jetten	Netherlands	Prime Minister	2026	25 March 1987	39 years, 239 days
7	Darijana Filipović	Bosnia and Herzegovina	Croat Member of the Presidency	2026	26 January 1987	39 years, 297 days
8	Nyam-Osoryn Uchral	Mongolia	Prime Minister	2026	2 January 1987	39 years, 321 days
9	Jakov Milatović	Montenegro	President	2023	7 December 1986	39 years, 347 days
10	Laura Fernández	Costa Rica	President	2026	4 July 1986	40 years, 138 days

=== Top ten since 1795 ===
Currently living

Rank	Name	State	Position	Assumed office	Age when assuming office
1	Alfonso XIII	Spain	King	1886	0 days
2	Sobhuza II	Swaziland	King	1899	141 days
3	Fuad II	Egypt	King	1952	192 days
4	Girvan Yuddha	Nepal	King	1799	1 year, 140 days
5	Puyi	China	Emperor	1908	2 years, 299 days
6	Rajendra	Nepal	King	1816	2 years, 353 days
7	Isabella II	Spain	Queen	1833	2 years, 354 days
8	Gyanendra	Nepal	King	1950	3 years, 123 days
9	Guangxu	China	Emperor	1875	3 years, 195 days
10	Mwambutsa IV	Burundi	King	1915	3 years, 224 days

== Oldest state leaders ==
The following lists show the oldest people who have served office as state leader (not limited to their age while in office).

=== Top ten living ===
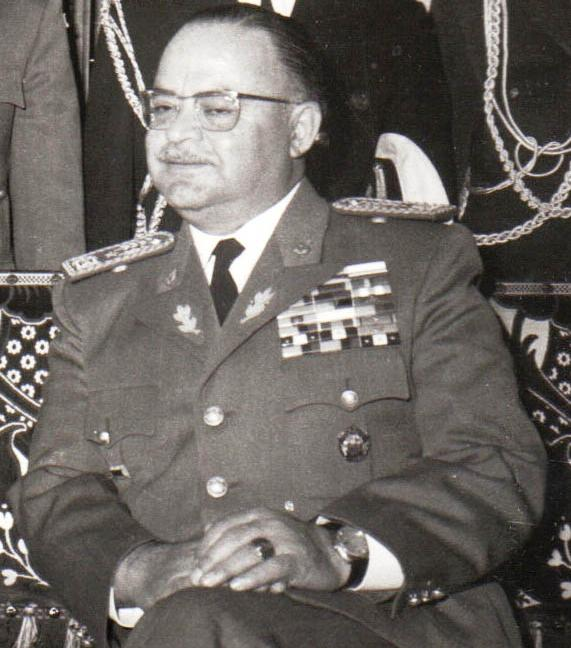
Guillermo Rodríguez, the oldest living state leader

Rank	Name	State	Position	Born	Age
1	Guillermo Rodríguez	Ecuador	Acting President (1972–1976)	4 November 1923	103 years, 15 days
2	Mahathir Mohamad	Malaysia	Prime Minister (1981–2003; 2018–2020)	10 July 1925	101 years, 132 days
3	Mohammad Hasan Sharq	Afghanistan	Chairman of the Council of Ministers (1988–1989)	17 July 1925	101 years, 125 days
4	Abdoulaye Wade	Senegal	President (2000–2012)	29 May 1926	100 years, 174 days
5	Valdas Adamkus	Lithuania	President (1998–2003; 2004–2009)	3 November 1926	100 years, 16 days
6	Arthur Foulkes	Bahamas	Governor-General (2010–2014)	11 May 1928	98 years, 192 days
7	Péter Boross	Hungary	Prime Minister (1993–1994)	27 August 1928	98 years, 84 days
8	Orville Turnquest	Bahamas	Governor-General (1995–2001)	19 July 1929	97 years, 123 days
9	Michael J. Williams	Trinidad and Tobago	Acting President (1987)	16 October 1929	97 years, 35 days
10	Gombojavyn Ochirbat	Mongolia	General Secretary of the People's Revolutionary Party (1990)	15 November 1929	97 years, 4 days

=== Top ten since 1800 ===
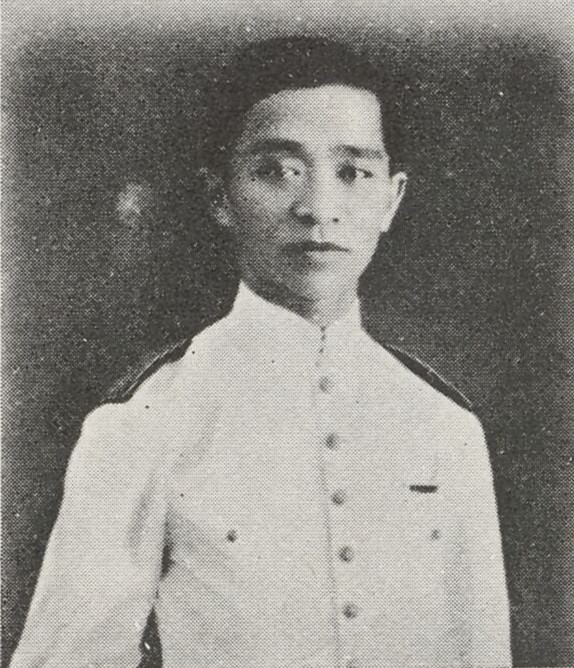
Chau Sen Cocsal Chhum, the longest-lived state leader

Currently living

No.	Name	State	Position	Birth	Death	Age
1	Chau Sen Cocsal Chhum	Cambodia	Acting Prime Minister (1962)	1 September 1905	22 January 2009	103 years, 143 days
2	Celâl Bayar	Turkey	Prime Minister (1937–1939); President (1950–1960)	16 May 1883	22 August 1986	103 years, 98 days
3	Guillermo Rodríguez	Ecuador	Acting President (1972–1976)	4 November 1923	Alive	103 years, 15 days
4	Antoine Pinay	France	Prime Minister (1952–1953)	30 December 1891	13 December 1994	102 years, 348 days
5	Prince Naruhiko Higashikuni	Japan	Prime Minister (1945)	3 December 1887	20 January 1990	102 years, 48 days
6	Babiker Awadalla	Sudan	Acting Prime Minister (1969)	2 March 1917	17 January 2019	101 years, 321 days
7	Willem Drees	Netherlands	Prime Minister (1948–1958)	5 July 1886	14 May 1988	101 years, 314 days
8	Đỗ Mười	Vietnam	Chairman of the Council of Ministers (1988–1991); General Secretary of the Communist Party (1991–1997)	2 February 1917	1 October 2018	101 years, 241 days
9	Tomiichi Murayama	Japan	Prime Minister (1994–1996)	3 March 1924	17 October 2025	101 years, 228 days
10	Zhang Qun	China	Premier (1947–1948)	9 May 1889	14 December 1990	101 years, 219 days

== See also ==
- Lists of state leaders
