= 2012 Samoan o le Ao o le Malo election =

Election of the head of state of Samoa

2012 Samoan o le ao o le Malo election
- 19 July 2012
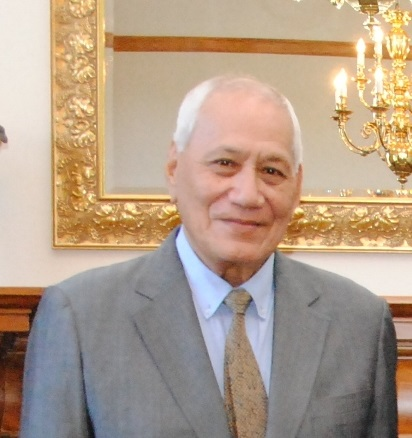
Nominee	Tui Ātua Tupua Tamasese Efi
Party	Independent
Electoral vote	Uncontested
O le Ao o le Malo before election
Tui Ātua Tupua Tamasese Efi
Independent
Elected O le Ao o le Malo
Tui Ātua Tupua Tamasese Efi
Independent

Indirect elections for the o le Ao o le Malo (head of state) were held in Apia on 19 July 2012. Incumbent Tui Ātua Tupua Tamasese Efi was the only candidate, and was re-elected unopposed. He had been nominated by Prime Minister Tuila'epa Sa'ilele Malielegaoi and seconded by Palusalue Fa’apo II, the leader of the opposition.

== Background ==
The O le Ao o le Malo is the head of state of Samoa; established after independence in 1962. The position is mostly ceremonial. Although power is vested in the prime minister and their cabinet, the head of state can dissolve parliament, and no act can become law without their signature.

The Constitution drafted in 1960 and adopted upon independence stated that two paramount chiefs, Malietoa Tanumafili II and Tupua Tamasese Meaʻole, representatives of "two of the four main family lineages", would serve as co-heads of state for life. After the death of both individuals, the legislative assembly would elect successive heads of state. Tupua Tamasese died in 1963, a year after independence. From then on, Malietoa served as the sole head of state until his death in May 2007.

Incumbent head of state, Tui Ātua Tupua Tamasese Efi, was first elected in 2007 following the death of the long-serving O le Ao o le Malo, Malietoa Tanumafili II. During that election, parliament elected Tui Ātua, and he faced no opposition.

As in the previous election, Tui Ātua was the only candidate; prime minister Tuila'epa Sa'ilele Malielegaoi of the Human Rights Protection Party re-nominated him, seconded by opposition leader Palusalue Fa’apo II of the Tautua Samoa Party.

== Eligibility ==
Parliament elects the head of state for a five-year term. For an individual to qualify to be head of state, they must be a citizen of Samoa, be eligible to run for parliament and not have previously been removed from office.

== Aftermath ==
Parliament unanimously re-elected Tui Ātua. His inauguration for a second term took place the following week, on 27 July 2012, at parliament.
