= Irving Carruthers =

Samoan politician (1884–1974)

Member of the Legislative Council
- In office 1932–1938

Personal details
- Born: 27 October 1884 Samoa
- Died: 5 July 1974 (aged 89)
- Profession: Businessman

Irving Hetherington Carruthers (27 October 1884 – 5 July 1974) was a Western Samoan businessman and politician.

== Biography ==
Carruthers was born in Samoa in 1884, one of five children of Richard and Matua Carruthers. His father was a Scottish solicitor who had immigrated to Samoa from Melbourne in Australia, and worked for Robert Louis Stevenson. He attended the Marist Brothers school in Apia, after which he went into business, leasing a cocoa plantation in Malaedono. He became a member of the committee of the Chamber of Commerce and the Planters Association.

Carruthers married Anne Jennings from Swains Island and had five children. Anne died in the early 1900s. Carruthers later married Vaopunimatagi Seumanautafa in 1919. After his second wife died, he married Moe in 1934, with whom he had three children. In 1929 he established I.H. Carruthers, a cocoa and copra merchant company. The business was later renamed Eveni Carruthers.

Carruthers contested the 1932 elections to the Legislative Council with the support of the Chamber of Commerce and the Planters' Association. He was elected alongside his brother-in-law Alan Cobcroft. He was re-elected in 1935, but did not stand in the 1938 elections.
