= Alfred Smyth =

Alfred Smyth may refer to:

- Alfred Smyth (politician) (1879–1959), member of the Legislative Council of Samoa
- Alfred P. Smyth (1942–2016), Irish-born historian
