= Alfred Smyth (politician) =

Samoan politician

Member of the Legislative Council
- In office 1935–1938, 1944–1948

Personal details
- Born: 17 June 1879; Maitland, New South Wales
- Died: 27 October 1959 (aged 80); Sydney, Australia
- Profession: Businessman

Alfred George Smyth (17 June 1879 – 27 October 1959) was a New South Wales-born Western Samoan politician.

== Biography ==
Smyth was born in Maitland, New South Wales and attended the local Sacred Heart School and the government school on Thursday Island. He started work at Burns Philp in Thursday Island and married Emily Richmond Brown in 1901, after which the couple moved to Bowen, Queensland and then Charters Towers. They had a daughter named Emmy. After working for Burns Philp for 16 years, Smyth spent two years running his own business, before moving to Papua in 1910 to work for C.R. Baldwin.

In 1914 Smyth moved to Levuka in Fiji to work for Morris Hedstrom, but left in 1918 to start work for H.J. Moors in Apia in Western Samoa. Later in the same year he relocated to Auckland to open a branch of O.F. Nelson & Co. Returning to Samoa, he bought a business in Apia, which he sold to Morris Hedstrom in 1927. He then worked for A.M. Brodziak in Fiji, before returning to Apia to take over as head of the local branch of Morris Hedstrom. In 1933 he rejoined O.F. Nelson to become General Manager and a director of the firm. In 1937 he took over a general store and bakery, launching A.G. Smyth & Co.

=== Political career ===
Smyth was a member of the anti-colonial Mau movement. He contested the first elections to the Legislative Council in 1924, but finished fifth out of the eight candidates running for the three available seats. As a result of his Mau activities, he was deported in January 1928 and exiled for two years.

When Smyth was due to return to Western Samoa on 28 December 1929, the Mau movement planned a major reception for him. However, when the police attempted to arrest a member of the procession, a fight erupted and several Mau members were shot dead by the police firing into the crowd. The event became known as Black Saturday. Smyth was then considered for deportation again; although Governor Stephen Allen described him as an "ass", he decided that another stint in exile was unjustified.

Smyth planned to contest the 1932 elections. Although he was widely considered the favourite candidate, he was forced to withdraw his candidacy due to his employer's opposition. Smyth did contest the 1935 elections, and was elected with by far the most votes. He ran for re-election in the 1938 elections as a member of the United Progressive Party, but was defeated by Olaf Frederick Nelson and Charles Dawson. He contested the 1941 elections, but lost to Nelson and Amando Stowers.

In 1944 Smyth ran again for election to the Legislative Council, and was successful in regaining his seat. He did not run in the 1948 elections due to poor health, but unsuccessfully contested the 1951 elections.

=== Later life ===
In September 1957 he moved to Australia. He died in Sydney in 1959.
