= 2022 Samoan o le Ao o le Malo election =

Election of the head of state of Samoa

- 23 August 2022
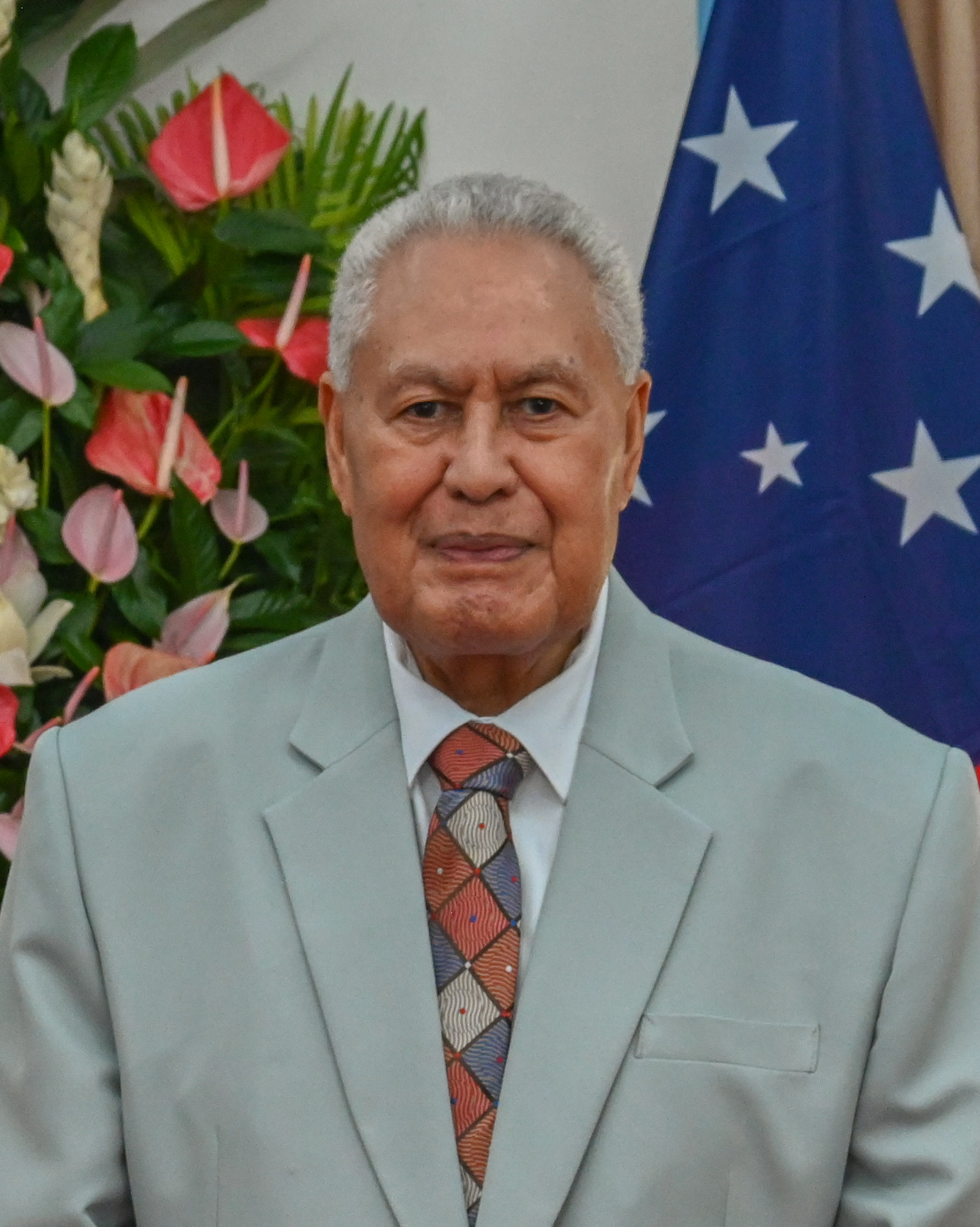
| Nominee | Tuimalealiʻifano Vaʻaletoʻa Sualauvi II |
| Party | Independent |
| Electoral vote | Uncontested |
O le Ao o le Malo before election
Tuimalealiʻifano Vaʻaletoʻa Sualauvi II
Independent
Elected O le Ao o le Malo
Tuimalealiʻifano Vaʻaletoʻa Sualauvi II
Independent

Indirect elections for the o le Ao o le Malo (head of state) were held in Samoa on 23 August 2022. Incumbent Tuimalealiʻifano Vaʻaletoʻa Sualauvi II was the only candidate, and was re-elected unanimously. He had been nominated by Prime Minister Fiamē Naomi Mataʻafa.
