= Ala Tamasese =

Samoan independence activist

Ala Tamasese, 1929

Ala Tamasese (fl. 1929–1930) was a Samoan independence activist and a leader of the women's wing of the Mau movement. She was the wife of the Mau leader Tupua Tamasese Lealofi III, who was mortally wounded by New Zealand police during the "Black Saturday" demonstration in Apia on 28 December 1929.

== Women's Mau ==
After Black Saturday, the men of the Mau retreated into the hills to avoid arrest, and the movement's open political activity was continued by its women's wing. Ala Tamasese was among the leaders of this Women's Mau, alongside figures such as Paisami Tuimalealiifano and Faamusami Faumuina. At its height the women's movement had around 8,000 supporters, who staged marches and supplied men in hiding with food and clothing.
