= Alan Cobcroft =

Samoan politician

Member of the Legislative Council
- In office 1932–1935

Personal details
- Born: Sydney, New South Wales
- Died: 5 September 1955 (aged 70); Auckland, New Zealand
- Profession: Planter

Alan Ridge Cobcroft (died 5 September 1955) was a Western Samoan planter and politician.

== Biography ==
Cobcroft was the son of parents from the Sydney suburb of Summer Hill. He attended Sydney Grammar School and represented the school in football, rowing and running. He also played for Newtown in the Sydney Rugby Premiership as a full-back. After leaving school, he moved to Fiji in 1907 to work on the sugar plantations of C.S.R. He moved to Western Samoa in 1911 to manage Papaseea Plantations, and became manager of the Mulifanua Coconut Plantation during World War I. After a brief stint working in the Territory of New Guinea, he returned to Western Samoa and established his own cocoa plantation. He became President of the Planters Association and Vice President of Apia Turf Club.

Cobcroft contested the 1932 elections to the Legislative Council with the support of the Chamber of Commerce and the Planters' Association. He was elected alongside his brother-in-law Irving Carruthers. He unexpectedly lost his seat in the 1935 elections, receiving the fewest votes of the four candidates running for the two seats. The following year he was amongst the founders of the United Progressive Party, becoming its first chairman.

He died on 5 September 1955 in Auckland at the age of 70.
