= 1941 Western Samoan general election =

General elections were held in Western Samoa on 5 November 1941.

== Electoral system ==
Two Europeans were elected from a single two-seat constituency. Voting was restricted to European and mixed European-Samoans aged 21 or over. A total of 578 people registered to vote, including around a hundred German nationals, whose right to vote in the election was confirmed by the New Zealand government.

== Campaign ==
It was reported in October 1941 that the two incumbent members Charles Dawson and Olaf Frederick Nelson would not stand; Nelson due to ill-health and Dawson having left the Samoa. However, Nelson did eventually contest the elections, alongside former MLCs Alfred Smyth and Arthur Williams, the shop manager Percy Glover and Amando Stowers, a planter and leader of the Labour Party.

== Results ==
Candidate	Votes	%	Notes
Olaf Frederick Nelson	367	33.92	Re-elected
Amando Stowers	238	22.00	Elected
Alfred Smyth	221	20.43	
Percy Glover	140	12.94	
Arthur Williams	116	10.72	
Total	1,082	100.00	
Source: Pacific Islands Monthly
