= Amando Stowers =

Samoan politician

Member of the Legislative Assembly
- In office 1948–1951

Member of the Legislative Council
- In office 1941–1948

Personal details
- Died: Apia, Western Samoa
- Political party: Labour Party
- Profession: Planter

Amando Stowers, also known by the Samoan name Vui Tafilipepe Amato, was a Western Samoan politician. He served as a member of the Legislative Council and Legislative Assembly from 1941 until 1951.

== Biography ==
Stowers was a part-Samoan descendant of the English trader John Stowers. A planter, he held the title of vui in Fa'asaleleaga district. He was a founder of the Labour Party in 1936, later becoming its president.

He contested the 1938 elections to the Legislative Council, finishing fourth in the two-seat European constituency. However, he was elected in 1941, surprisingly defeating Alfred Smyth. He was subsequently re-elected in 1944, topping the poll. In 1948 the Legislative Council was replaced with the Legislative Assembly, to which Stowers was elected as sole elected representative of the Labour Party. He did not contest the 1951 elections.

He died in Apia hospital at the age of 76 around the start of 1963.
