= 2017 Samoan o le Ao o le Malo election =

Election of the head of state of Samoa

- 5 July 2017
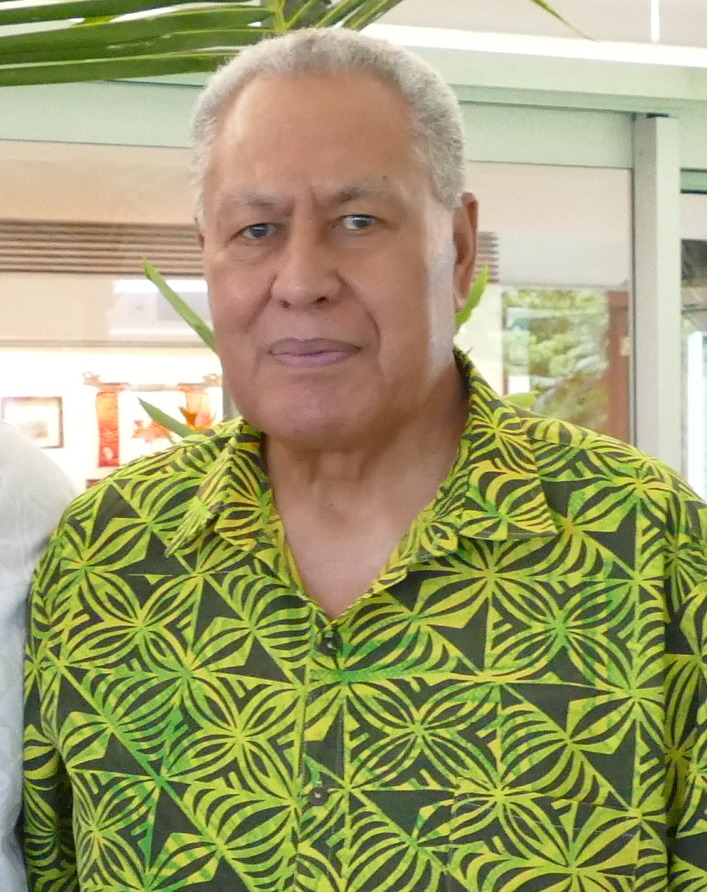
Nominee	Tuimalealiʻifano Vaʻaletoʻa Sualauvi II
Party	Independent
Electoral vote	Uncontested
O le Ao o le Malo before election
Tui Ātua Tupua Tamasese Efi
Independent
Elected O le Ao o le Malo
Tuimalealiʻifano Vaʻaletoʻa Sualauvi II
Independent

Indirect elections for the o le Ao o le Malo (head of state) were held in Samoa on 5 July 2017. Tuimalealiʻifano Vaʻaletoʻa Sualauvi II was the only candidate, and was elected unopposed. He had been nominated by Prime Minister Tuila'epa Sa'ilele Malielegaoi.
