= 1944 Western Samoan general election =

General elections were held in Western Samoa on 1 November 1944.

== Electoral system ==
Two Europeans were elected from a single two-seat constituency. Voting was restricted to European and mixed European-Samoans aged 21 or over.

== Results ==
Candidate	Votes	%	Notes
Amando Stowers	370	38.03	Re-elected
Alfred Smyth	321	32.99	Elected
A. McFarlane	160	16.44	
Percy Glover	80	8.22	
Edward Westbrook	42	4.32	
Total	973	100.00	
Source: Pacific Islands Monthly

=== Nominated members ===
Tualaulelei Mauri, appointed to the Council in 1943 retained his place on the council.

Savea Ioane, Pulepule Tu'i and Meleisea Felise were all appointed to the Council in October 1945.
