= Al Nashwa, Iraq =

Al Nashwa النشوة
- Location within Iraq
- Coordinates: 30°49′17″N 47°35′47″E
- Country: Iraq
- Governorate: Basra
- Time zone: UTC+3 (AST)

Al Nashwa (النشوة ) is a village of Basrah Governorate on the east bank of the Shatt Al-Arab River in southern Iraq.

It is a service center for the nearby oil fields, and the United States Army had a base near the town.
