= Fa'ato'ialemanu =

Fa'ato'ialemanu Fa'ato'ia
- Village
- Location in Tuamasaga
- Coordinates: 13.8399°S 171.7554°W
- Country: Samoa
- District: Tuamasaga
- Electoral consisuency: Vaimauga 3

Population (2021)
  - Total: 906
- Time zone: UTC+13:00 (Pacific/Apia)
- Post code: WS1323

Fa'ato'ialemanu is a village on the island of Upolu in Samoa. It is situated on the north central side of the island and is part of the greater Apia area. The village has a population of 906.

The village is in the political district of Tuamasaga.
