= Charles Dawson (doctor) =

New Zealand doctor

Member of the Legislative Council
- In office 1938–1941

Personal details
- Died: 5 February 1956
- Profession: Doctor

Charles McBeth Dawson (died 5 February 1956) was a New Zealand doctor who worked in Niue, Tonga and Western Samoa. He was involved in both world wars, and served as a member of Legislative Council of Samoa between 1938 and 1941.

== Biography ==
Dawson moved to Niue in 1913, before becoming Chief Medical Officer in the New Zealand expeditionary force that occupied German Samoa at the start of World War I. He then moved onto Palestine, where he served in the ANZAC Mounted Division and was mentioned in dispatches. At the end of the war he moved to Tonga, where he served as Chief Medical Officer for fourteen years. In 1933 he moved to Apia in Western Samoa, becoming the territory's only private doctor.

Dawson contested the 1935 Legislative Council elections, finishing third out of the four candidates contesting the two seats. He ran for election again in 1938, and was elected to the Legislative Council after finishing in second place. In 1940 he took a leave of absence from the council to join the Merchant Navy as a surgeon. He did not contest the 1941 elections.

In 1941 Dawson returned to Tonga after being appointed a Medical Officer in Vavaʻu. He retired from medical practice in 1949 and returned to New Zealand. He died in February 1956.
