= 1932 Western Samoan general election =

General elections were held in Western Samoa on 9 November 1932.

== Electoral system ==
In 1930 the constitution was amended to reduce the number of Europeans in the Legislative Council from three to two and to have two Samoans nominated.

The two elected European members were elected from a single two-seat constituency, with only Europeans allowed to vote. Voters were able to vote for two candidates.

== Campaign ==
Five candidates contested the two available seats. Brothers-in-law Irving Carruthers and Alan Cobcroft were both supported by the Chamber of Commerce and the Planters' Association, as well as many civil servants. The other three candidates all ran as independents, including sitting member Samuel Meredith. Alexander W. Johnston, the other incumbent member, had died in June 1932 and his seat left vacant until the elections.

== Results ==
Candidate	Votes	%	Notes
Irving Carruthers	76	25.08	Elected
Alan Cobcroft	72	23.76	Elected
Robert Graham Bruce	69	22.77	
Robert Carl Wekell	47	15.51	
Samuel Meredith	39	12.87	Unseated
Total	303	100.00	
Total votes	157	–	
Registered voters/turnout	172	91.28	
Source: Pacific Islands Monthly

== Aftermath ==
The newly elected Council met for the first time on 23 March 1933.
