= Vaimoso =

Village in Samoa

- Village
- Location within Samoa
- Coordinates: 13°50′27″S 171°46′47″W
- Country: Samoa
- District: Tuamasaga

Population (2016)
  - Total: 2,465
- Time zone: UTC-11 (Samoa Time Zone)

Vaimoso is a village on the island of Upolu in Samoa. It is situated on the north central side of the island near the country's capital Apia. The village is in the political district of Tuamasaga.

The population is 2465. Girls' high school Kolisi o Sagata Maria is located here.
