= Tupua Tamasese Meaʻole =

O le Ao o le Malo of Western Samoa from 1962 to 1963

His Highness Afioga Tupua Tamasese Meaʻole CBE
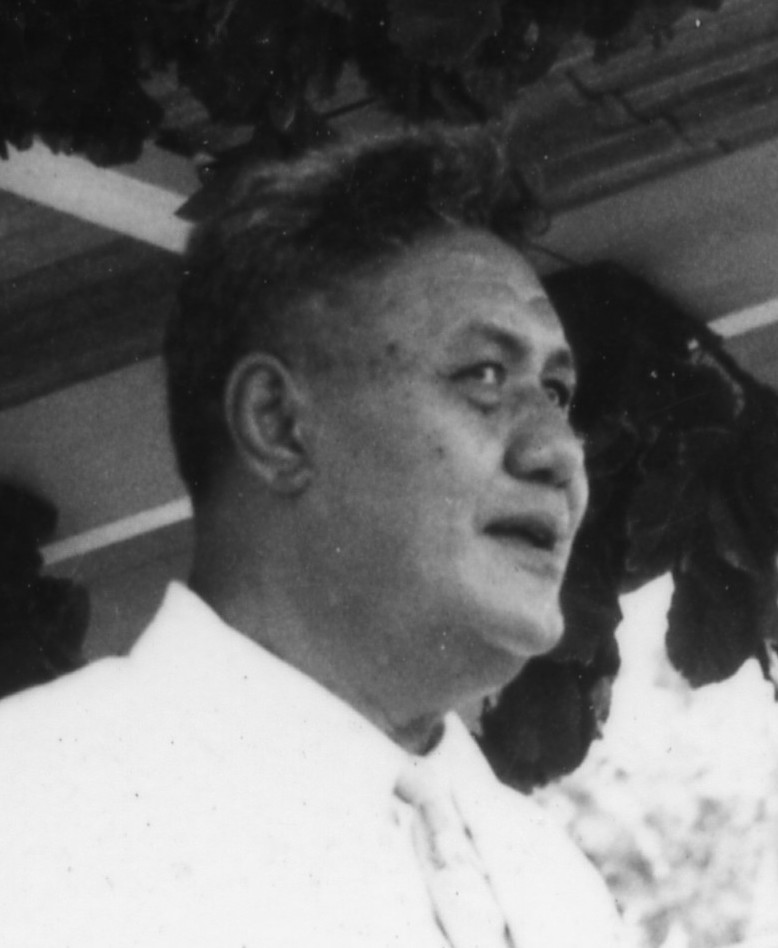
- Tamasese in 1962

O le Ao o le Malo of Western Samoa
- In office 1 January 1962 – 5 April 1963 Serving with Malietoa Tanumafili II
- Prime Minister: Fiame Mataʻafa Faumuina Mulinuʻu II
- Preceded by: Office established

Member of the Legislative Assembly
- In office 1948 – 1957

Member of the Legislative Council
- In office 1935 – 1948

Tupua Tamasese
- Tenure: 1929 – 5 April 1963
- Predecessor: Tupua Tamasese Lealofi III
- Successor: Tupua Tamasese Lealofi IV
- Born: 3 June 1905; Vaimoso, German Samoa
- Died: 5 April 1963 (aged 57); Apia, Western Samoa
- Spouse: Irene Gustava Noue Nelson
- Issue: Tui Ātua Tupua Tamasese Efi and three other children
- Father: Tupua Tamasese Lealofi I

Tupua Tamasese Meaʻole CBE (3 June 1905 – 5 April 1963) was O le Ao o le Malo (head of state) of Western Samoa, serving jointly with Malietoa Tanumafili II from its independence in 1962 until his death the following year. He succeeded to the Tupua Tamasese title in 1929, following the assassination of Tupua Tamasese Lealofi III.

== Early and personal life ==
He was born in Vaimoso in 1905, one of three sons of the paramount chief Tupua Tamasese Lealofi I. He was educated at the Marist school in Apia. In 1929, he was installed as Tupua Tamasese when his elder brother and Mau leader, Tupua Tamasese Lealofi III was assassinated by colonial police during a Mau parade in Apia.

== Career ==
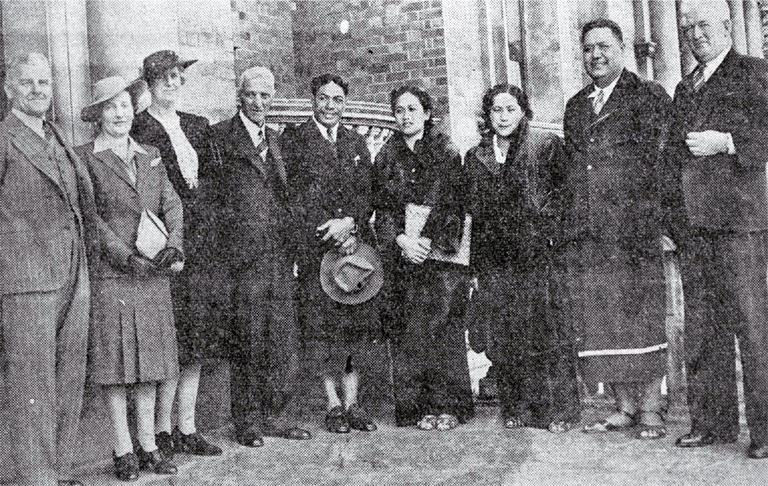
Meaʻole (second from right) and Malietoa Tanumafili II (fifth from left) in Christchurchwith Mayor Ernest Andrews (fourth from left) and Deputy-Mayor Melville Lyons (right), 1945

He married Noue in 1934, a daughter of Olaf Frederick Nelson. They had two daughters and two sons. In 1936, he was appointed to the Legislative Council, and in 1938 he was appointed as one of the fautua (advisor to the Administrator). In the same year he became president of the Mau. As a fautua, he continued to serve in the Legislative Council and its successor, the Legislative Assembly until 1957. He was a member of the Council of State and the Executive Council until 1959.

Away from politics, Tamasese was involved in business, serving as chair of the board of the Western Samoa Trust Estates Corporation, a director of the Bank of Western Samoa and a member of the Copra Board. In 1953, he attended the coronation of Elizabeth II in London and was awarded the Queen Elizabeth II Coronation Medal. In the 1957 New Year Honours he was appointed a Commander of the Order of the British Empire.

In preparations for independence, Tamasese chaired the constitutional conventions of 1954 and 1960. When Western Samoa attained independence in 1962, the new constitution made Tupua Tamasese and Malietoa Tanumafili II (the two fautua) joint heads of state for a life tenure.

== Death ==
Tamasese died in office at the age of 57 on 5 April 1963, having suffered from cancer and tuberculosis in his later life. He was survived by his wife and their four children. His funeral took place the following day and comprised a period of lying in state, a Requiem Mass, and a funeral procession through Apia. Following his death, his family conferred the title of Tupua Tamasese on his eldest nephew, Tupua Tamasese Lealofi IV, who would go on to become the second Prime Minister of Samoa. As head of state, he was survived by Malietoa, who became the lone holder of the office.

Political offices
Office established	O le Ao o le Malo of Samoa; 1962–1963; Served alongside: Malietoa Tanumafili II	Succeeded by Malietoa Tanumafili II as sole O le Ao o le Malo
Regnal titles
Preceded by Tupua Tamasese Lealofi III	Tupua Tamasese; 1929–1963	Succeeded by Tupua Tamasese Lealofi IV
