= O le Ao o le Malo =

Head of state of Samoa

O le Ao o le Malo of the Independent State of Samoa
- O le Ao o le Malo o le Malo Saʻoloto Tutoʻatasi o Sāmoa
- Coat of arms of Samoa

- Flag of Samoa

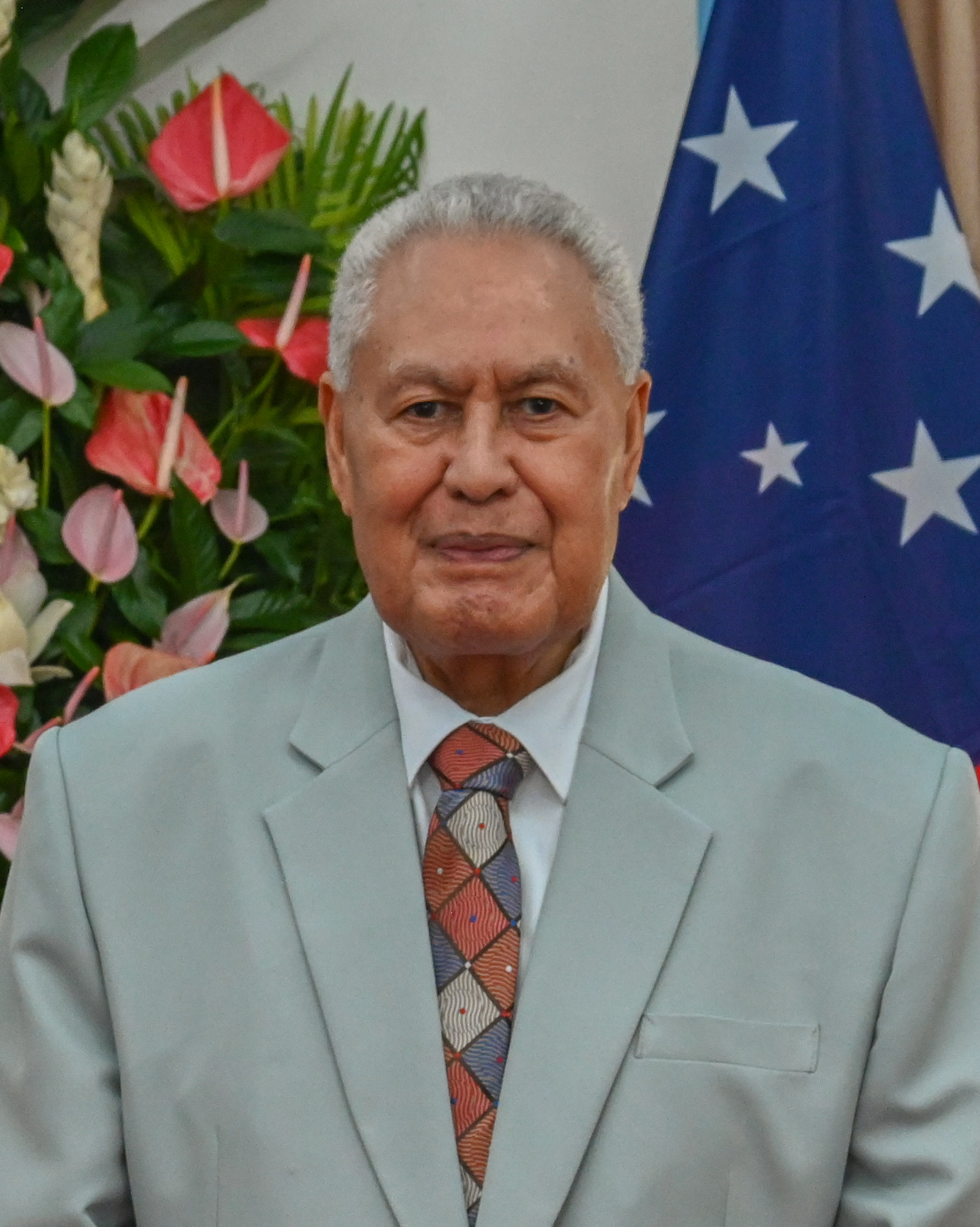
- Incumbent; Tuimalealiʻifano Vaʻaletoʻa Sualauvi II since 21 July 2017
- Style: His Highness
- Type: Head of state
- Residence: Vailele
- Seat: Apia
- Appointer: Legislative Assembly
- Term length: Five years, renewable once
- Constituting instrument: Constitution of Samoa
- Inaugural holder: Tupua Tamasese Meaʻole; Malietoa Tanumafili II
- Formation: 1 January 1962; 64 years ago
- Deputy: Members of the Council of Deputies
- Salary: US$82,000 annually
- Website: www.samoagovt.ws

The O le Ao o le Malo (Samoan for 'chief of state') (Note: Ao is a title generally reserved for chiefs (matai), while malo means 'state' or 'government'.) is the head of state of Samoa. The office is equivalent to a ceremonial president in parliamentary republics. The title is usually translated into English as Head of State or by the initialism HOS.

At the time the constitution was adopted, it was anticipated that future heads of state would be chosen from among the four tamaʻāiga paramount chieftains in line with customary protocol. However, this is not a constitutional requirement. Since the election is not restricted to the "royal" lineages and is done by the country's elected parliament, Samoa is considered a elective monarchy along the lines of Malaysia or the UAE. The government press secretariat describes the O le Ao o le Malo as a "ceremonial president". Similar to monarchs, the holder is given the formal style of His Highness, as is the case with the four tamaʻāiga.

The Council of Deputies collectively acts as the deputy to the head of state, substituting in the event of a vacancy or when the head of state cannot otherwise fulfill their duties. The incumbent head of state is Tuimalealiʻifano Vaʻaletoʻa Sualauvi II, who was elected to a five-year term in 2017 and re-elected in 2022.

== History ==
The 1960 constitution of Samoa stipulated that heads of state were to be elected by the Legislative Assembly for five-year terms. At the same time, it created an exception for Tupua Tamasese Meaʻole and Malietoa Tanumafili II, named jointly for a life tenure beginning on Samoa's independence day on 1 January 1962. They represented, respectively, the paramount lineages of the Tupua Tamasese and Malietoa; both had fiercely competed in a civil war during the late 19th century for control for the four district chieftain titles, known as pāpā. The two officeholders were jointly known as O Ao o le Malo and individually as O le Ao o le Malo. On the death or resignation of either, the surviving counterpart would remain in office alone, and the article which constituted their appointment would be sunset after the end of both terms.

The former home of writer Robert Louis Stevenson in Vailima served as the head of state's official residence, known as Government House, from 1963 until the early 1990s, when it was damaged in a series of cyclones; the building subsequently became the Robert Louis Stevenson Museum.

Tui Ātua Tupua Tamasese Efi was the first head of state to be elected by the Legislative Assembly, after Malietoa's death in 2007. A son of Meaʻole, he had previously served as Prime Minister from 1976 to 1982.

In 2019, the Samoan government led by the Human Rights Protection Party (HRPP) amended the constitution, introducing a two-term limit for the head of state. In November 2021, the government of the Faʻatuatua i le Atua Samoa ua Tasi (FAST) party announced that it was considering an amendment to make the office a lifetime appointment. This suggestion was part of a review of the constitution.

== Qualifications ==
Article 18 of the Samoan constitution sets the qualifications for the position of head of state. They must:

- be eligible for election as a member of the Legislative Assembly;
- possess such qualifications as the Legislative Assembly may determine by resolution;
- not have previously been removed from the office on the grounds of misbehaviour or infirmity.

== Term of office ==
The head of state is elected by the Legislative Assembly for five years and can be re-elected once. The exceptions to this were Tupua Tamasese Meaʻole and Malietoa Tanumafili II, who were exempted from the election and term length clauses laid down by Article 19. A 2019 amendment to the constitution states that the head of state can serve no more than two terms.

A head of state's term may be terminated by:

- resignation;
- impeachment by the Legislative Assembly on the grounds of misbehaviour or mental or physical infirmity;
- approval by two-thirds of the Legislative Assembly of a resolution for removal that is proposed and supported by at least a fourth of its members, following at least fourteen days between the notice of motion and debate on the motion;
- death.

== Duties and powers ==
Although the head of state formally leads the executive, in practice they only act on the advice of the Prime Minister, making the position that of a ceremonial figurehead. The head of state has the ability to appoint the prime minister from any member of the Legislative Assembly commanding the confidence of a majority of members of the Assembly. As in other parliamentary systems, this is typically the leader of the political party holding the most seats in the Assembly. Cabinet ministers, the Speaker of the Legislative Assembly and justices of the Supreme Court can only formally take office upon subscribing to an oath in the presence of the head of state as provided by the constitution.

While the head of state "does not play an active role in government", they can dissolve the Assembly, and no act of the Assembly becomes law without their approval, akin to royal assent in monarchies. They also have the power to grant pardons.

== Elections ==
To date, there have been four elections for the office of head of state. The first was held on 16 June 2007, in which Tui Ātua Tupua Tamasese Efi was elected unopposed by the 49-member strong parliament. The second was held on 19 July 2012, in which Efi was nominated by Prime Minister Tuila'epa Sa'ilele Malielegaoi and seconded by Palusalue Faʻapo II, the leader of the opposition. The third was held on 30 June 2017, in which Tuimalealiʻifano Vaʻaletoʻa Sualauvi II was elected unopposed. The fourth was held on 23 August 2022, in which Sualauvi II was reelected unopposed.

== List of officeholders ==
Political affiliations

Independent

Status

Denotes acting O le Ao o le Malo

Symbols

^{C} Constitutional referendum

^{D} As member of the Council of Deputies

No.	Portrait	Name (Birth–Death)	Term of office			Political party	Elected	Prime minister(s)	Ref.
No.	Portrait	Name (Birth–Death)	Took office	Left office	Time in office	Political party	Elected	Prime minister(s)	Ref.
1		Tupua Tamasese Meaʻole (1905–1963) (Note: Life tenure. Served jointly with Tanumafili II.)	1 January 1962	5 April 1963 #	1 year, 94 days	Independent	1961^{[C]}	Mulinuʻu II	
1		Malietoa Tanumafili II (1913–2007) (Note: Life tenure. Served jointly with Meaʻole until 5 April 1963.)	1 January 1962	11 May 2007 #	45 years, 130 days	Independent	1961^{[C]}	Mulinuʻu II; Lealofi IV; Tupua; Kolone; Alesana; Tuilaʻepa	
—		Tui Ātua Tupua Tamasese Efi^{[D]} (born 1938) acting	11 May 2007	20 June 2007	40 days	Independent	—	Tuilaʻepa	
—		Tuimalealiʻifano Vaʻaletoʻa Sualauvi II^{[D]} (born 1947) acting	11 May 2007	20 June 2007	40 days	Independent	—	Tuilaʻepa	
2		Tui Ātua Tupua Tamasese Efi (born 1938)	20 June 2007	21 July 2017	10 years, 31 days	Independent	2007	Tuilaʻepa	
2		Tui Ātua Tupua Tamasese Efi (born 1938)	20 June 2007	21 July 2017	10 years, 31 days	Independent	2012	Tuilaʻepa	
3		Tuimalealiʻifano Vaʻaletoʻa Sualauvi II (born 1947)	21 July 2017	Incumbent	9 years, 120 days	Independent	2017	Tuilaʻepa; Mataʻafa; Schmidt	
3		Tuimalealiʻifano Vaʻaletoʻa Sualauvi II (born 1947)	21 July 2017	Incumbent	9 years, 120 days	Independent	2022	Tuilaʻepa; Mataʻafa; Schmidt	

== See also ==
- Samoa
  - Politics of Samoa
  - List of colonial governors of Samoa
  - Prime Minister of Samoa
  - Deputy Prime Minister of Samoa
- Lists of office-holders
