= Lefagaoaliʻi =

- Village
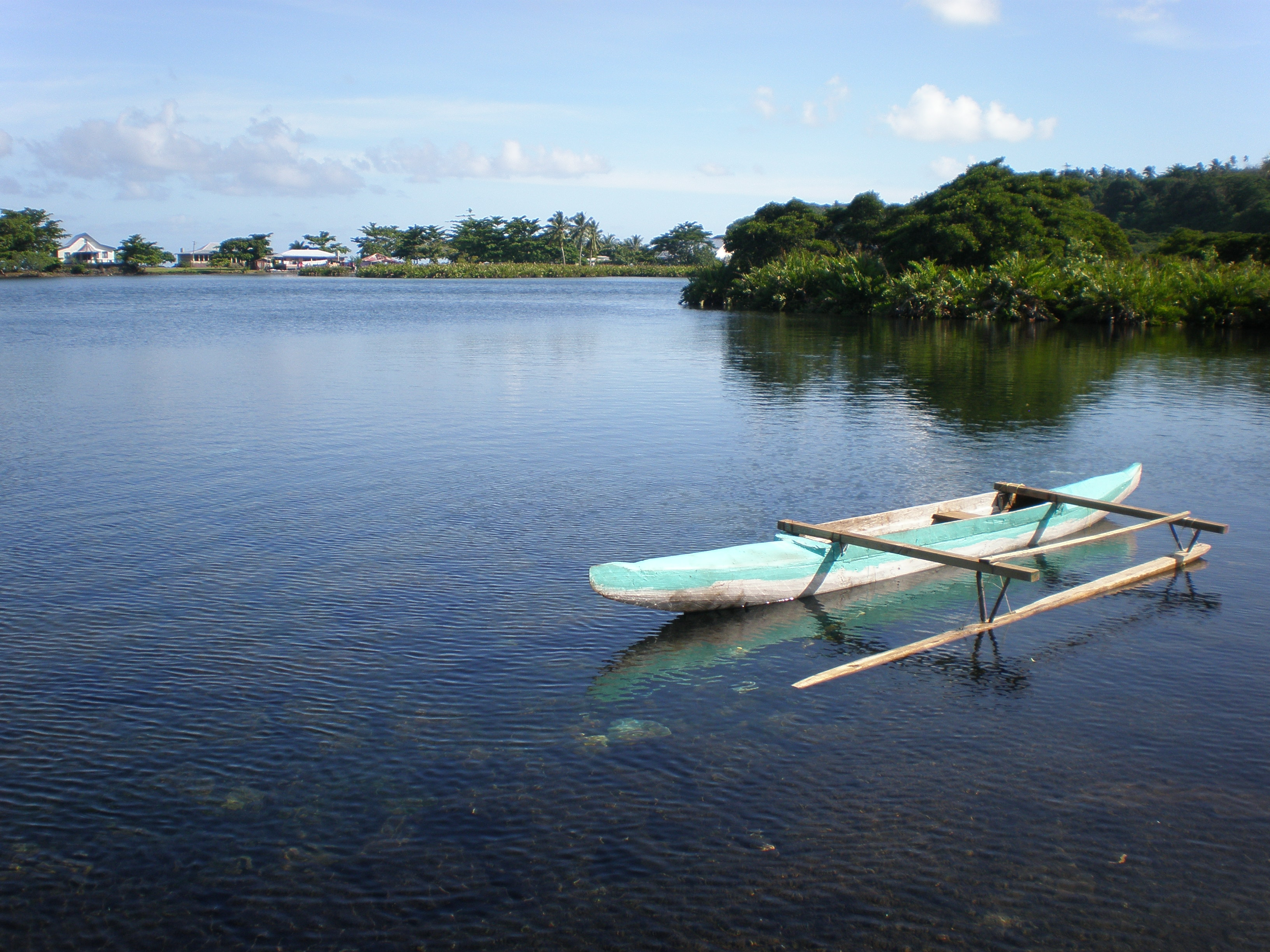
- View of Lefagaoaliʻi from the south at Mata o le Alelo pool

- Location within Samoa
- Coordinates: 13°28′1″S 172°25′16″W
- Country: Samoa
- District: Gagaifomauga

Population (2016)
  - Total: 485
- Time zone: -11

Lefagaoaliʻi is a village on the central north coast of Savaiʻi island in Samoa. The village is in the electoral district of Gagaifomauga 2. The population is 485.

The settlement is situated on a thin spit of land with the ocean on the north side and an inland lake with mangroves on the south side which flows out to the open sea through a gap at the west end of the village. The main island road circling Savaiʻi passes the village at the east end at the bottom of a steep hill. At the base of the cliffs at the east end of the village, and by the sea, are freshwater springs used by the people of Lefagaoaliʻi and neighbouring villages.

To the east of Lefagaoaliʻi are the villages of Samauga and Safotu. On the south and towards the west are Safune, Faletagaloa and Sasina.

There are reef breaks for surfing directly in front of the village although the waves are not for the inexperienced.
