= Gagaʻifomauga =

Coordinates: 13°29′S 172°30′W

- District
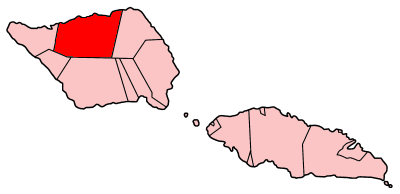
- Map of Samoa showing Gagaifomauga district
- Country: Samoa

Population (2016)
  - Total: 4,878
- Time zone: -11

Gagaʻifomauga is a political district on the island of Savaiʻi in Samoa. The district is situated on the northern side of the island with a population of 4,878 (2016 Census).

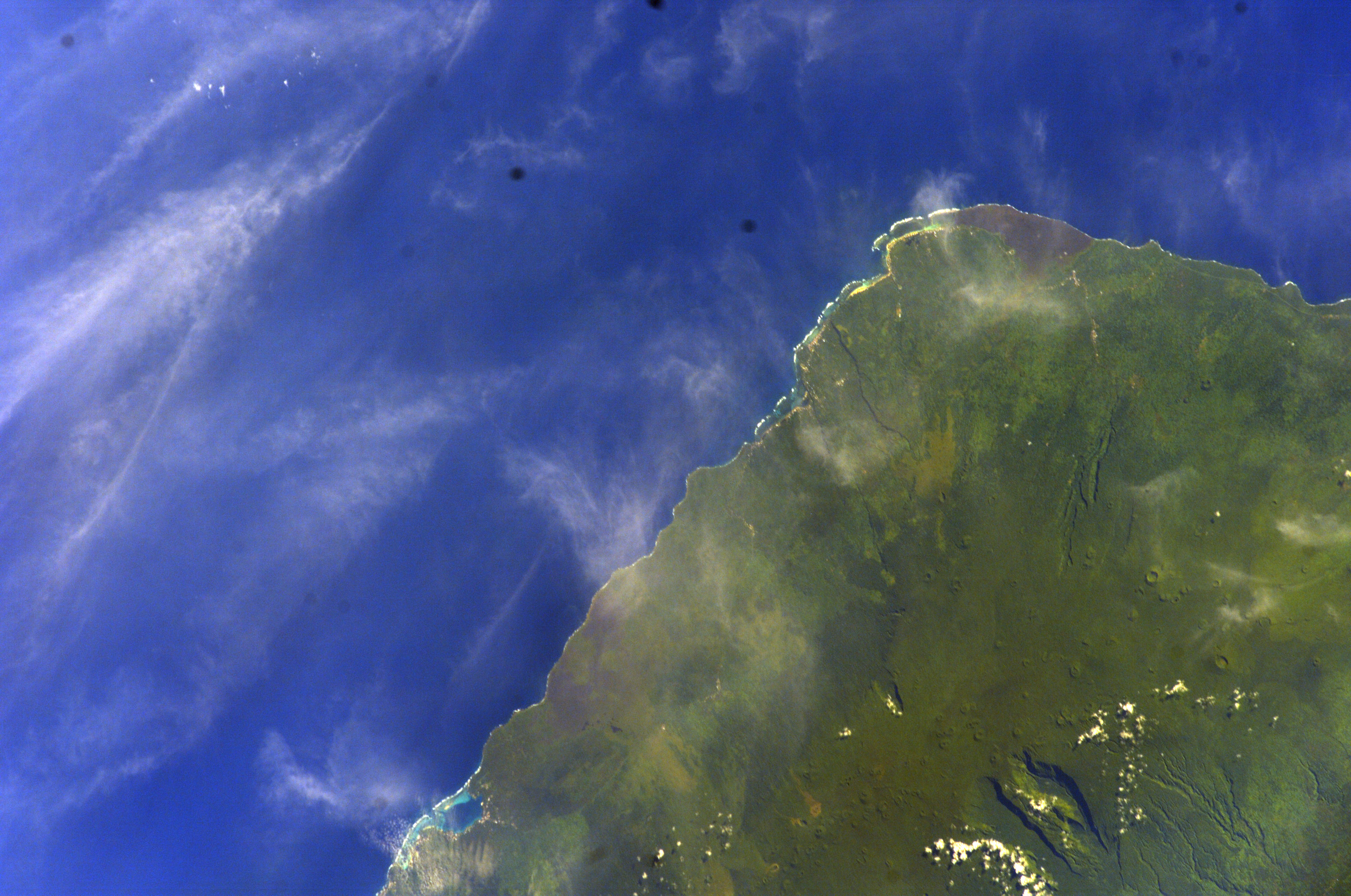
Gagaʻifomauga & Gagaʻemauga districts north central Savaiʻi. NASA image from space at 188 nautical miles (348 km)

Gagaʻifomauga district include the village communities of Aopo, Lefagaoali'i, Manase, Safune, Safotu, Samauga and Sasina. The main village in the district was traditionally Aopo. Manase, Safotu, Sasina and Safune are situated by the sea. Samauga is upon a rocky foothill between Safotu and Safune while the Aopo settlement is inland.

The village of Manase is a popular destination for visitors and tourists with beach fale accommodation.

The main road circling Savai'i passes through the northern coastline, where most of the settlements are situated. Heading west, the road turns inland at Sasina village. There are forest conservation areas at Aopo where a local guide can be found for a hike up to Mount Silisili, the highest peak in Samoa.

The Safune traditional village district was the location for Moana (1926), one of the earliest documentaries directed by Robert J. Flaherty. A fresh spring pool called Mata o le Alelo in the village of Matavai in Safune is associated with the legend Sina and the Eel. A leader of Samoa's independence movement during the early 1900s, Olaf Frederick Nelson was born in Safune.

In pre-history, the village of Safotu was settled by Tongan chiefs.

There is a district hospital at the west end of Safotu village.

== Gaga'ifomauga electoral constituencies ==
There are 3 electoral constituencies in Gaga'ifomauga District on Savai'i island.

- Gaga'ifomauga 1 includes;
  - Safotu
  - Manase
- Gaga'ifomauga 2 includes;
  - Faletagaloa
  - Fatuvalu
  - Leagiagi
  - Lefagaoali'i
  - Matavai
  - Paia
  - Safune
  - Samauga
- Gaga'ifomauga No. 3 includes;
  - Aopo
  - Fagaee
  - Letui
  - Sasina

== See also ==
- List of schools in Savai'i
- Politics of Samoa
