= Samauga =

- Village
- Location within Samoa
- Coordinates: 13°27′30.73″S 172°24′53″W
- Country: Samoa
- District: Gagaifomauga

Population (2016)
  - Total: 373
- Time zone: -11

Samauga is a village on the central north coast of Savai'i island in Samoa. It is situated on the central north coast of the island in the district of Gagaʻifomauga and the electoral district of Gagaʻifomauga 2. The population is 373.

There is a primary school, a church and several small local stores with the main road passing through the village. At the east end is the village of Safotu and on the west side, the road heads towards Lefagaoali'i and Safune. There is a turnoff in the village to the inland village of Paia.

From 2006 to 2009, the women's committee (Komiti a Tina ma Tamaitai) in the village have been working with the Ministry of Agriculture, United Nations Development Programme (UNDP) and South Pacific Business Development towards improving agricultural methods in the village. The impact of land clearance for subsistence agriculture has resulted in soil salinity. A key project has been to phase out the use of pesticides while diversifying crops for organic gardening and traditional medicinal plants. Part of the community initiative includes the development of income-generating micro-schemes for women and the potential of sustainable cultural tourism.
