= Manase =

- Village
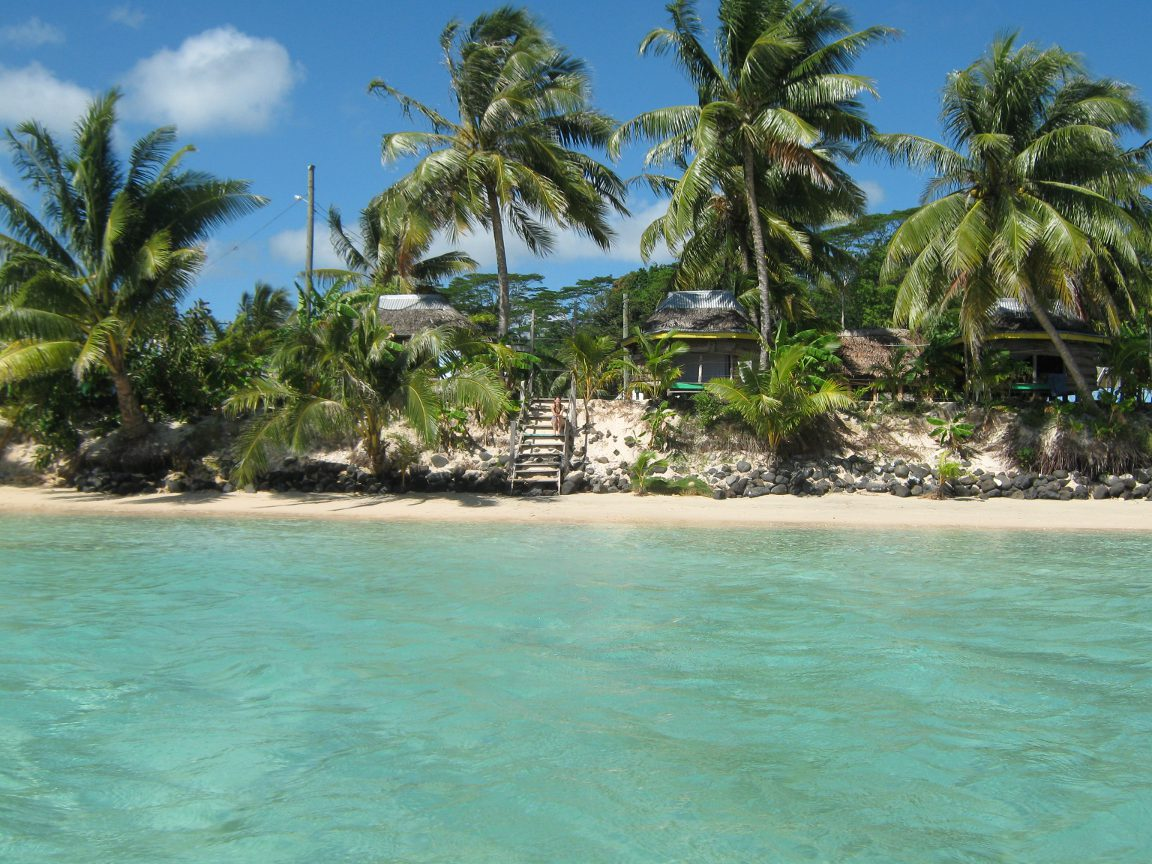
- Tanu Beach Front, Manase

- Location within Samoa
- Coordinates: 13°26′48″S 172°22′46″W
- Country: Samoa
- District: Gagaifomauga

Population (2016)
  - Total: 123
- Time zone: -11

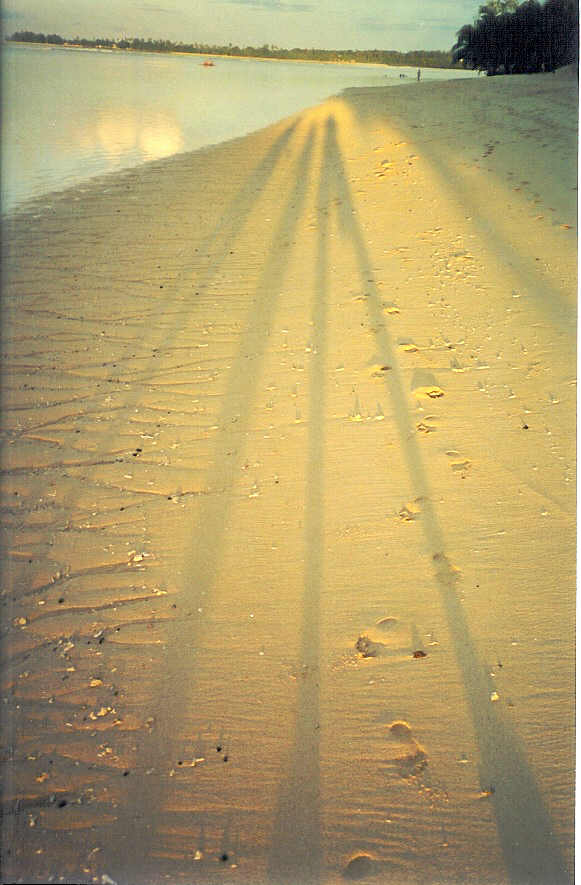
A beach in Manase.

Manase is a village on the central north coast of Savai'i island in Samoa in the political district of Gagaifomauga. It has a population of 123.

Situated by the sea with a white sandy beach, Manase has become a popular tourist destination since the 1990s with low budget and locally owned beach fale accommodation. There is a petrol station with a shop at the east end of the village and another small store selling basic goods at Tanu Beach Fales. The nearest hospital is at the neighbouring village of Safotu and there's a post office and a small police station in Fagamalo, five minutes drive east.

Heading west around the coast, the next village is Safotu followed by Samauga and the Safune settlements. Manase is 45 km from the ferry terminal and township of Salelologa at the east end of the island.
