= Sasina =

Sasina may refer to:

- Sasina, Samoa, a village in Samoa
- Sasina (Sanski Most), a village in Bosnia
