= David Smith (rugby union, born 1986) =

Samoan rugby union player

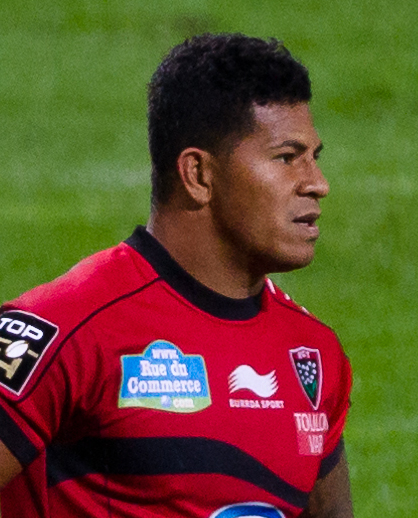
- Smith during a match against Toulouse, September 2012
- Born: 12 October 1986 (age 40) Manase, Samoa
- Height: 179 cm (5 ft 10 in)
- Weight: 94 kg (207 lb; 14 st 11 lb)
- School: Mount Albert Grammar School

Rugby union career
- Position(s): Wing, Centre
- Current team: Narbonne
Senior career
Years	Team	Apps	(Points)
2006–2008	Auckland	34	(70)
2007–2010	Hurricanes	36	(60)
2008	Blues	5	(10)
2009	Wellington	14	(35)
2010	Taranaki	12	(25)
2011	Force	15	(25)
2011–2015	Toulon	101	(190)
2015–2019	Castres	105	(165)
2019–	Narbonne	13	(15)
- Correct as of 12 May 2020
International career
Years	Team	Apps	(Points)
2010	Barbarian F.C.	1	(0)
- Correct as of 12 May 2020
National sevens team
Years	Team		Comps
2008	New Zealand		1
- Correct as of 12 May 2020

David Smith (born 12 October 1986) is a Samoan rugby union player who plays with RC Narbonne in the French Top 14 He previously played for the Hurricanes, Blues and Western Force in Super Rugby as well as Toulon & Castres Olympique.

== Early life and career ==
Smith grew up in the village of Manase. He was spotted whilst on a rugby tour to New Zealand and was subsequently offered a scholarship to attend Auckland's Mount Albert Grammar School. His mentor and coach was former Auckland RFU and All Blacks player Bryan Williams, with whom he trained before being brought into the wider Auckland training squad in 2005. After a year playing for Auckland B and the Auckland Sevens team, Smith, under the tutelage of coach Pat Lam, and with the guidance and help of fellow Samoan player Brad Mika, was selected in the 2006 Auckland Air New Zealand Cup squad. He later played in the ITM Cup for Wellington and Taranaki David Smith also has children, four boys and one girl.

== Super Rugby career ==
In late 2006 when he was named as one of the Hurricanes draft picks for the 2007 Super 14 season. This selection by Hurricanes coach Colin Cooper forced incumbent winger Roy Kinikinilau out of the team, who was subsequently drafted by the Highlanders. Expected to start as a back-up wing for the Hurricanes, Smith was part of the starting line-up the first game of the season against the Queensland Reds, relegating Samoan international Lome Fa'atau to the bench for much of the season. By the season's end, David Smith had accumulated 12 caps as well as scoring his first try against the Vodacom Stormers of South Africa.

He was signed by the Blues in 2008, before returning to the Hurricanes in 2009. In November 2010, it was announced that the Western Force had signed Smith for the 2011 Super Rugby season.

== Top 14 career ==
Following that season, he moved to France, signing for Toulon.

Before the 2015-2016 season he transferred to Castres. He then moved in 2019 to RCNM in Federal 1 league.

== Honours ==
=== Club ===
(France) Castres

- Top 14: 2017–18
