= Sagapolutele =

Sagapolutele is a Samoan surname. Notable people with the surname include:

- Jaron-Keawe Sagapolutele (born 2006), American football player
- Pio Sagapolutele (1969–2009), Samoan football player
- Raymond Sagapolutele (born 1971), New Zealand photographer and visual artist

== See also ==
- Sagapolu
