= August Nelson =

Augustus Nelson
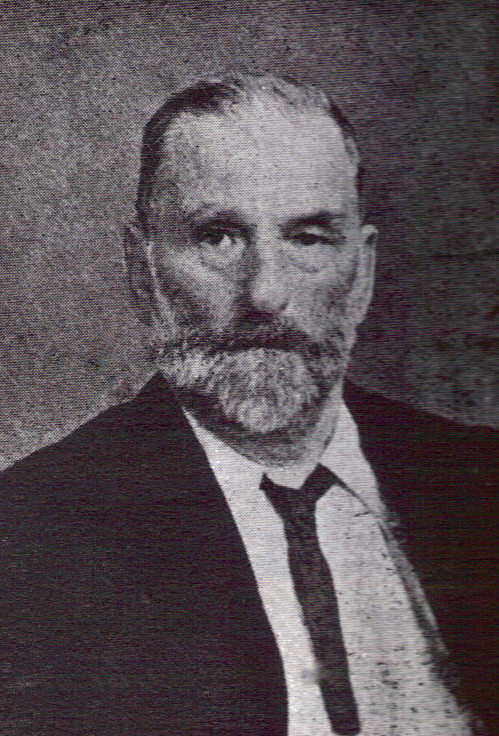
- Born: Nils Peter Gustafsson; September 5, 1838; Ödängla, Kalmar County, Sweden
- Died: May 19, 1909 (aged 70); Apia, German Samoa
- Spouse: Sine Gogo Tugaga Maso'
- Children: 6, including Olaf

Augustus Nelson (born Nils Peter Gustafsson, 5 September 1838 – 19 May 1909), also known as Gustav August Nilspeter Nilsson, was a Swedish sailor emigrating to Samoa and the patriarch of the Nelson family in Samoa.

== Biography ==
Little is known about Nelson's early life other than that he was born Nils Peter Gustafsson in Ödängla, Mönsterås outside Kalmar and went to sea around 1850 at the age of 12 or 13 years.

Nilsson worked as a sailor for about 7 years before he turned to gold mining, first in the Hokitika area in New Zealand and later also in Australia but without becoming wealthy. He then decided to try his luck with copra trading, which was a lucrative business on many islands in the South Pacific.

=== Settlement in the South Pacific ===
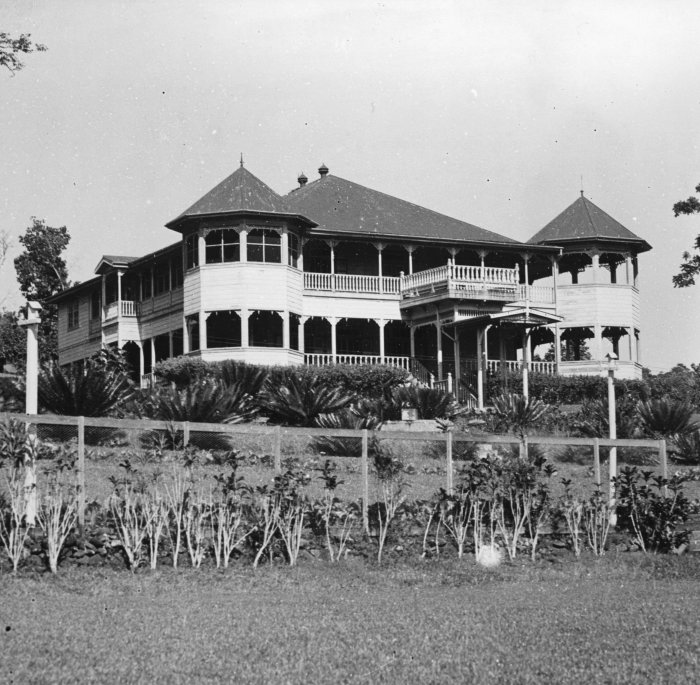
Nelson house, around 1936

Nilsson left Sydney in early 1868 and arrived in Apia on 9 March of the same year. There, he teamed up with British F. Cornwall and together they founded a trading company in the villages of Falelatai and Gagaemalae on Savaii and acquired two schooners for the business. Both ships, however, were lost at sea, and Cornwall turned to land dealings, while Nilsson continued his trading operations on the southern part of Savaii.

Nilsson now changed his name to Augustus Nelson, his business prospered, and he became a wealthy man. 1878 he moved to the village of Safune on the northern part of the island. There, he met the Samoan woman Sine Gogo Tugaga Maso' (also Sina Masoe) whose family had roots in the local noble family Sa Tupua. They later married, and the couple had six children, with their son Olaf Nelsson being the firstborn.

=== Later life ===
Nelson stayed in Safune until 1903 when he handed over the business to his son Olaf and the family moved to Apia. On 19 May 1909, Gustav Nelson died in his home in Apia at the age of 71.

== Legacy ==
Nelson's son would become a leading figure in Samoa's independence efforts and the Nelson family has since played an active role in the country's economic and political development.

In 1959 the "Nelson Memorial Public Library" was inaugurated in the center of Apia, partially donated by the family. The library was the first in the South Pacific to later implement the Koha system with assistance from UNESCO.

In 1967 Kalmar County Museum received a memorial gift in the form of a traditional Samoan garment (`ie toga) in his memory, the cloth having been presented to Ambassador Olof Kaijser during a visit to Safune in Samoa the previous year.
