= Sagapolu =

Sagapolu is a Samoan surname. Notable people with the surname include:

- Keia Mae Sagapolu (born 2000), American rugby union player
- Olive Sagapolu (born 1997), American football player

== See also ==
- Sagapolutele
