= Rosabel Nelson =

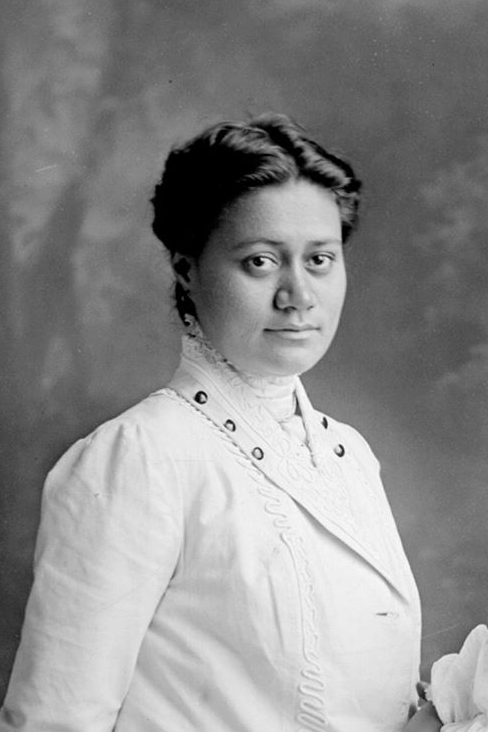
- Born: September 1889
- Died: June 1959; Apia
- Education: Mills College
- Spouse: Olaf Frederick Nelson
- Children: 6, including Olive Virginia Malienafau
- Father: Harry Jay Moors
- Relatives: Afoafouvale Misimoa

Rosabel Edith Nelson (September 1889 – June 1959) was a Samoan independence activist. She was the wife of Ta'isi Olaf Frederick Nelson, a founding leader of the Samoan anti-colonial Mau movement.

She was Rosabel Edith Moors in September 1889, the second daughter of Harry Jay Moors, a wealthy American businessman, and his Samoan wife Fa’animonimo. Harry Moors was one of the most successful businessmen in colonial Samoa and befriended Robert Louis Stevenson during the author's five years in Samoa. Rosabel Moore was educated at St. Mary's in Apia and Mills College in San Francisco. In July 1909, she married Nelson, the son of a Swedish businessman and his Samoan wife. O. F. Nelson was one of the wealthiest men in the Pacific islands, especially after the combination of his father's business and Moors' in 1922 as O. F. Nelson and Son Ltd.

As a result of his activities in the Mau movement, O. F. Nelson was exiled from Samoa in 1927, leaving Rosabel to oversee the business. In was later called the Black Saturday Massacre on December 28, 1929, nine Samoans were killed by colonial police, including Tupua Tamasese Lealofi III. Following the event, male Mau leaders were targeted for arrest and prosecution. Rosabel Nelson and three other prominent women formed a Women's Mau to continue agitating against the colonial government, who responded with character assassination, police raids, and charges of sedition against Rosabel and her sister Priscilla. They were convicted of sedition in April 1930, bur received suspended sentences.

Rosabel Nelson died in June 1959 in Papauta, Apia.

== Personal life ==
Rosabel and O. F. Nelson had five daughters and a son:

- Irene Gustava Noue Nelson (born 1910) - married Tupua Tamasese Mea’ole and they were the parents of Tui Atua Tupua Tamasese Tupuola Ta'isi Efi
- Olive Virginia Malienafau (born 1911) - the first female lawyer in Samoa, married Fredrick Betham
- Joyce Rosabel Piliopo “Billie” (born December 25, 1913) - married Richard Carruthers and Hermann Retzlaff, with the latter was the mother of Misa Telefoni Retzlaff
- Ta’isi Nelson (June 1915–September 1919) - died in the influenza outbreak in Samoa
- Sina Hope (born 1916) - married Edward Annandale and they were the parents of Dr. Viopapa Annandale–Atherton
- Sose Calmar Josephine Taufau (born July 8, 1918)
