= Safotu =

- Village
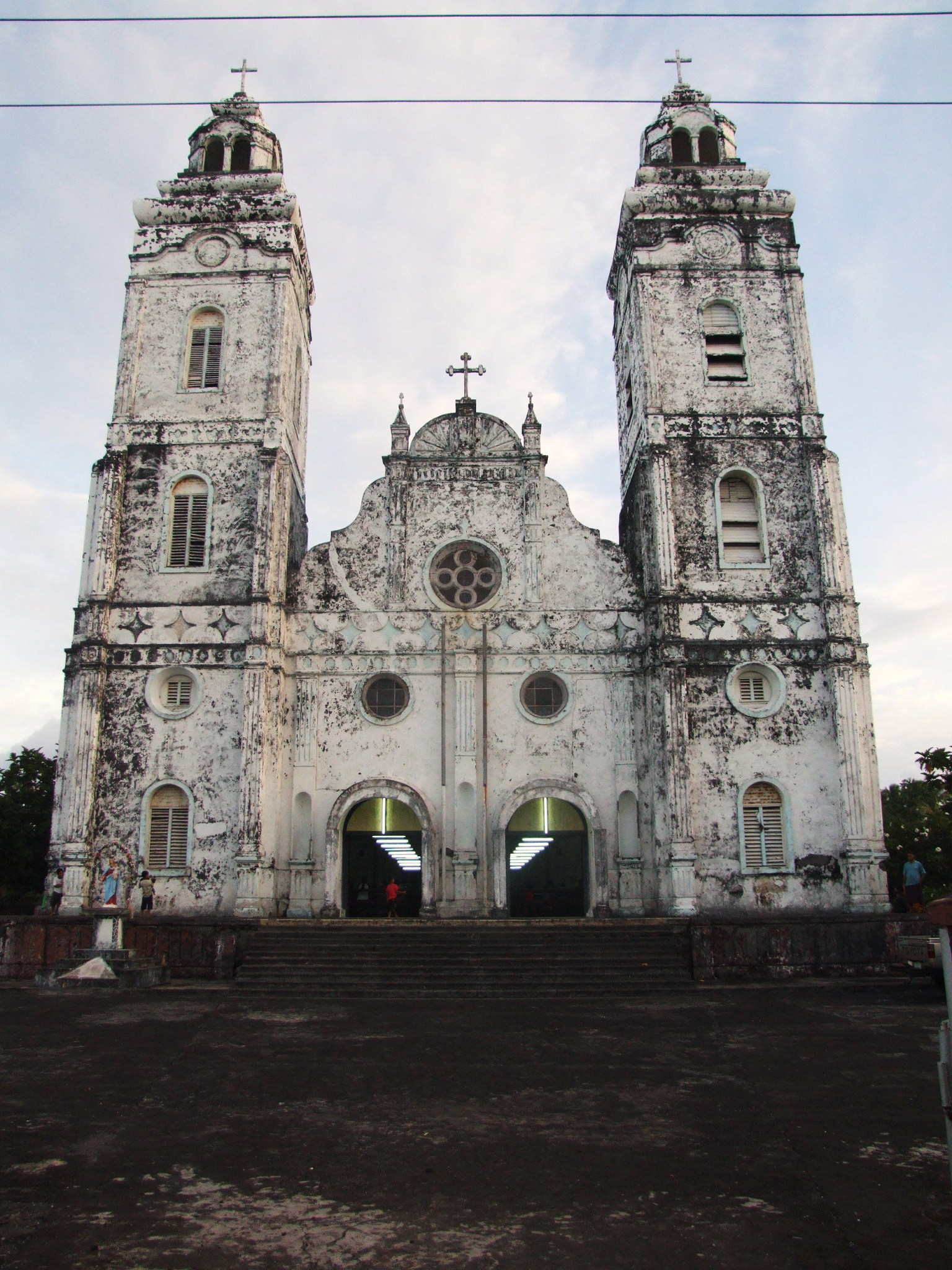
- Historic Catholic church in Safotu, 2007

- Location within Samoa
- Coordinates: 13°27′10″S 172°24′13″W
- Country: Samoa
- District: Gagaifomauga

Population (2016)
  - Total: 1,270
- Time zone: -11

Safotu is a village on the central north coast of Savai'i island in Samoa. Safotu is in the district Gagaifomauga and has a population of 1270. Traditionally, it attained the status of 'Pule,' customary political authority, and has been the main centre of the Gagaifomauga district.

Safotu is also associated with the chiefly matai Ao title of Lilomaiava.

The village is situated by the sea with a district hospital and school at the west end. The hospital sits upon a small rocky rise of black volcanic rock. The main island road passes through the village and there are several churches and local stores. A turnoff from the main road leads to the inland village settlement of Paia. Safotu is about 46 km from Salelologa and the ferry terminal. The popular tourist destination Manase village is the neighbouring village to the east. Heading west past the village is Samauga followed by Lefagaoali'i and Safune.

== Geography ==
Safotu is situated on a coastal strip at the west end of a volcanic escarpment approximately 50 m high that runs down to the coast. The coastal strip extends inland rising steadily towards Mt Matavanu. Atuimo Point is a rocky headland forming one end of Safotu beach. The lagoon varies from 300 to 400 metres or 1,000 to 1,300 feet in width along the coast with small reef breaks off the shore.

There are small freshwater springs surfacing along the shore and some of these are contained as village pools at the western end of Safotu beach.

== Pre-history ==
In pre-history, Safotu was a settlement for Tongans Talaaifeii was the name of one of the Tongan chiefs.

== Mythology ==
There are different stories about the origin of the name Safotu.

- In Samoan mythology Safotu and Safune were named after Fotu and Fune, the children of Lafai.
- The name Safotu goes back to the name of a girl Fotuisamoa, a sister of Ututauaofiti.
- Safotu and other villages in Savai'i (Matautu, Sataua, Salega) were founded by the children of Laufafaitoga who was the daughter of the Tui Tonga. Laufafaitoga's husbands were Tupa'imataua of Samoa and Lautala of Fiji.
- Laufafaetoga went to Samoa and became pregnant to Tupaimatuna. They sailed for Tonga but were blown off course and landed in Fiji. Their child was born and given the name Vaasilifiti. At this time, Fiji was in continual warfare and Lautala was the most famous warrior. Laufafaetoga and Lautala had three children. The first was named Ututauofiti who established the village of Matautu (where Fagamalo is situated). The second child was named Tauaofiti and he founded the village of Sataua. The third child, a girl named Lelegaotuitoga founded the village of Salega. Laufafaetoga ran away and returned to Tupaimatuna. She became pregnant again. The child was born before landing and was given the name Fotusamoa, hence the beginning of Safotu.
