= Olive Nelson =

Samoan lawyer (1911–1970)

Olive Virginia Malienafau Nelson (17 August 1911 – 18 March 1970) was Samoa's first female lawyer. She was the first Pacific Island graduate of the University of Auckland, and its first woman to graduate in law.

Nelson was born in Samoa, the second daughter of Samoan independence leader Olaf Frederick Nelson and Rosabel Moors. She had five sisters and one brother, although her brother died of influenza in the 1918 epidemic. In 1919 the six sisters were sent to New Zealand to study at an exclusive school in Remuera. They later attended MLC School in Sydney, Australia. Following her father's exile from Samoa in 1928 for advocating independence, she moved to Auckland, where she studied law at the then-Auckland University College.

In 1931 Nelson received the Butterworth Prize for the highest law exam results in the university. In 1933 she travelled to Samoa with her sisters and father, and then returned to Auckland to continue her studies. Nelson completed her law degree in 1936 and was admitted to the bar the same year, becoming the second woman admitted to the Supreme Court bar in New Zealand. Following her graduation, she returned to Samoa and became the country's first female barrister and solicitor.

In August 1937 she served as legal adviser to a Mau delegation to New Zealand. She was part of a second delegation in January 1938.

In 1939 she won the Western Samoan mixed doubles tennis championship with future Minister of Finance Fred Betham, who she went on to marry in 1942. She was later one of the drafters of the Constitution of Samoa.

She died in 1970. In 2022 the University of Auckland endowed a scholarship for law in her name.

== See also ==
- List of first women lawyers and judges in Oceania
