= Raymond Sagapolutele =

New Zealand photographer

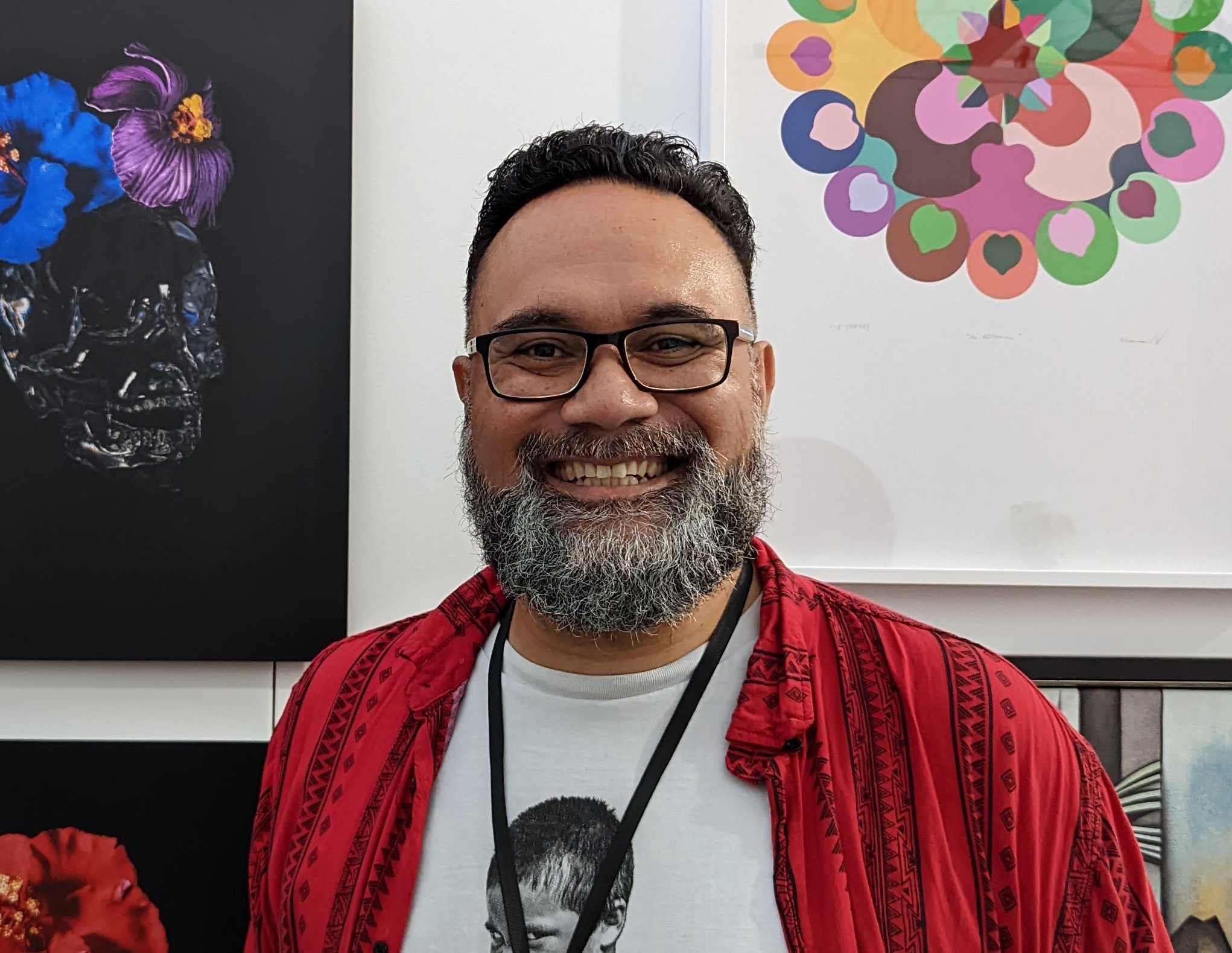
- Sagapolutele in 2022
- Born: Raymond Eddie Sagapolutele; 1971 (age 54–55); Ōtāhuhu, New Zealand
- Education: Auckland University of Technology
- Years active: Since 2003
- Known for: photography
- Website: www.raymondsagapolutele.com

Raymond Eddie Sagapolutele (born 1971) is a New Zealand photographer and visual artist of Samoan descent.

== Career ==
Sagapolutele was born in the South Auckland suburb of Ōtāhuhu in 1971, with ancestral ties to the villages of Fatuvalu in Savai’i and Saluafata in Upolu, Sāmoa. His early years were spent in Invercargill and Waikato, before the family returned to live in Manurewa in 1980. From 2003, he worked as a staff photographer for the publications Back to Basics and Rip It Up, as well as writing for The New Zealand Herald and Metro magazine.

Over the past decade, Sagapolutele has exhibited his work in group and solo exhibitions throughout Auckland, and been a member of the graffiti collective TMD.

Sagapolutele is a founding member of the ManaRewa art collective based at Nathan Homestead. As a senior member, he tutors and supports the local arts community. Sagapolutele completed his Masters in Visual Arts with first-class honours and received the Deans Award for Excellence in Postgraduate study from Auckland University of Technology. He has been a lecturer at Auckland University of Technology since 2020.

The camera is an important part of his practice as a Samoan-born New Zealander to reconnect his art to his Samoan heritage and the history of the Pacific. Sagapolutele's photography began when he took a photo of his brother's hip-hop group, the Deceptikonz, which was published in Rip it Up magazine. This led to years of editorial photography work for Sagapolutele, including a project in 2012 where he photographed his mother and sister, both of whom were dancers. This led to a project, called Out Of Context, inviting the Pacific community to be photographed in their day-to-day lives.

Sagapolutele uses skulls as a representation of ancestors from a Samoan perspective, and seeks to challenge western perceptions of skulls. He wants to educate people about how Samoans view the skeletal remains of love ones, as for Pacific people, they are respected and dealt with in different ways by various cultures. The use of skulls is an important part of Sagapolutele's practice.

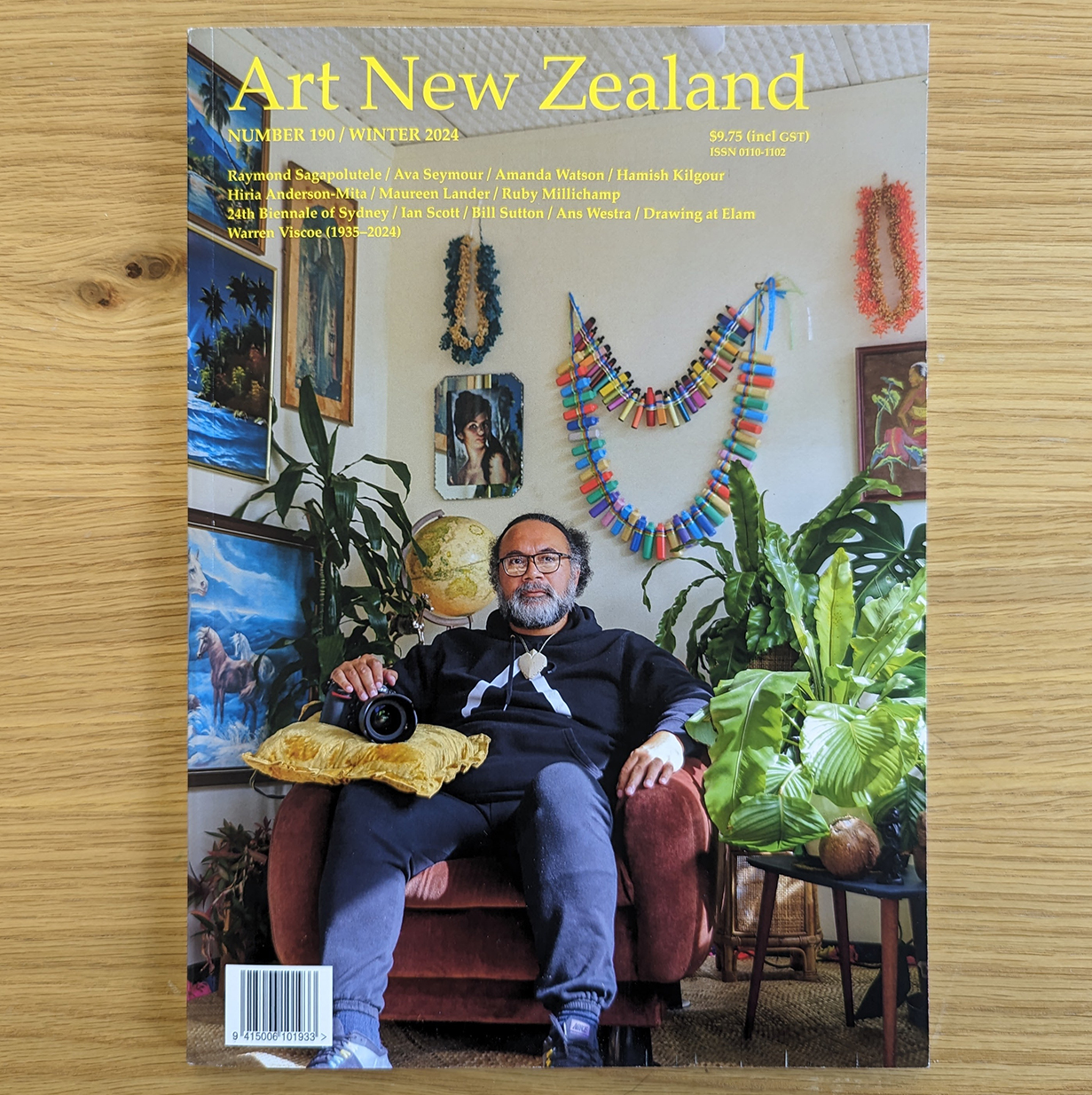
Raymond Sagapolutele on the cover of Art New Zealand

Sagapolutele explores blackness and nothingness in his photography, drawing on Pacific scholars like Albert Wendt. His masters in photography from Auckland University of Technology in 2018 allowed him to expand his work within the complexities of post-colonial identity. Sagapolutele creates works that connect to the Samoan tradition of Fāgogo, or storytelling.

=== Residencies ===
- 2025: Castle Hill Station Creative NZ Residency

=== Awards ===
- 2019: Dean's award for excellence in postgraduate study, Auckland University of Technology
- 2019: Finalist, Glaister Ennor Graduate Art Awards
- 2019: Honours, Wallace Art Awards

=== Selected solo exhibitions ===
- 2024: Our Parents' Dreams, Nathan Homestead, Auckland, New Zealand
- 2024: Mo I Tatou (For Us), Fresh Gallery Ōtara, Auckland, New Zealand
- 2022: Aua e te fefe - Don't be afraid, Bergman Gallery, Auckland, New Zealand

=== Selected group exhibitions ===
- 2025: Pride and Prejudice 2, Bergman Gallery, Rarotonga, Cook Islands
- 2024: Horizon 2, Bergman Gallery, Auckland, New Zealand
- 2024: Fa'aaliga, Beneath the Surface, Bergman Gallery, Auckland, New Zealand
- 2023: Horizon, Bergman Gallery, Auckland, New Zealand
- 2023: Pride and Prejudice... Part 1, Bergman Gallery, Auckland, New Zealand
- 2023: South-Versed23, Depot Artspace, Auckland, New Zealand
- 2023: Tusiata o le Tala le Vavau: Artists of the Forever Stories, Mangere Arts Centre, Auckland, New Zealand
- 2022: Fa'atasi, Bergman Gallery, Rarotonga, Cook Islands
- 2022: Te Atuitanga Beneath Our Cloak of Stars, Bergman Gallery, Auckland, New Zealand
- 2021: Ocean Memories, Kunsthalle Faust, Hanover, Germany
- 2021: The Most Dedicated:An Aotearoa Graffiti Story, The Dowse, Lower Hutt, New Zealand
- 2018: Grey is the new pink, Welkulturen Museum, Frankfurt, Germany
- 2016: Ata Te Tangata, Pingyao International Photography Festival, China
