= Aopo =

- Village & Sub-district
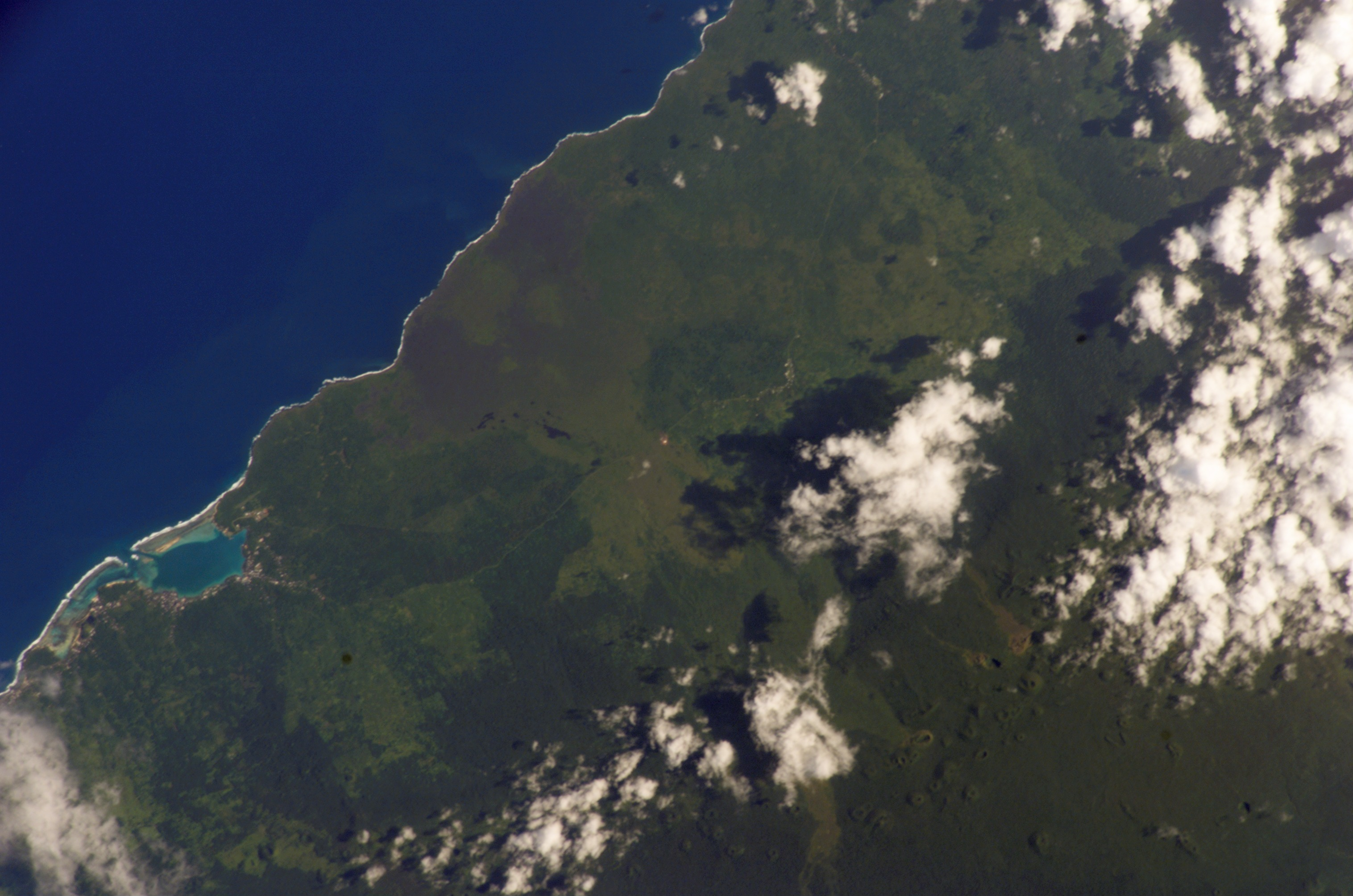
- Satellite image of Savai'i north west with Asau harbour, lava fields and Aopo inland. (NASA photo, 2002)

- Location within Samoa
- Coordinates: 13°29′S 172°30′W
- Country: Samoa
- District: Gaga'ifomauga

Population (2016)
  - Total: 383
- Time zone: -11

Aopo is a village in the Gaga'ifomauga district on the island of Savai'i in Samoa. It is situated inland in the central north of the island in the district of Gagaʻifomauga and the electoral district of Gagaʻifomauga 3. The population was 383 as of 2016. The name of the village is derived from two words, ao (day) and po (night) and may be derived from a volcanic eruption.

The village is located inland from the north coast of Savai'i, close to the main lava field from the island's volcanic cones. There is an Aopo Conservation Area open to visitors and the trail starts at the east end of the village.

Hikers can ascend Mt Silisili, Samoa's highest peak, from Aopo.

In 2007, Aopo village sold its teak plantation to Blue Bird Lumber.
