= Fatuvalu =

Coordinates: 13°28′9.18″S 172°25′53.18″W

Fatuvalu is a village on the island of Savai'i in Samoa. It is situated on the central north coast of the island in the district of Gagaʻifomauga and the electoral district of Gagaʻifomauga 2. The population is 193.
