= Mata o le Alelo =

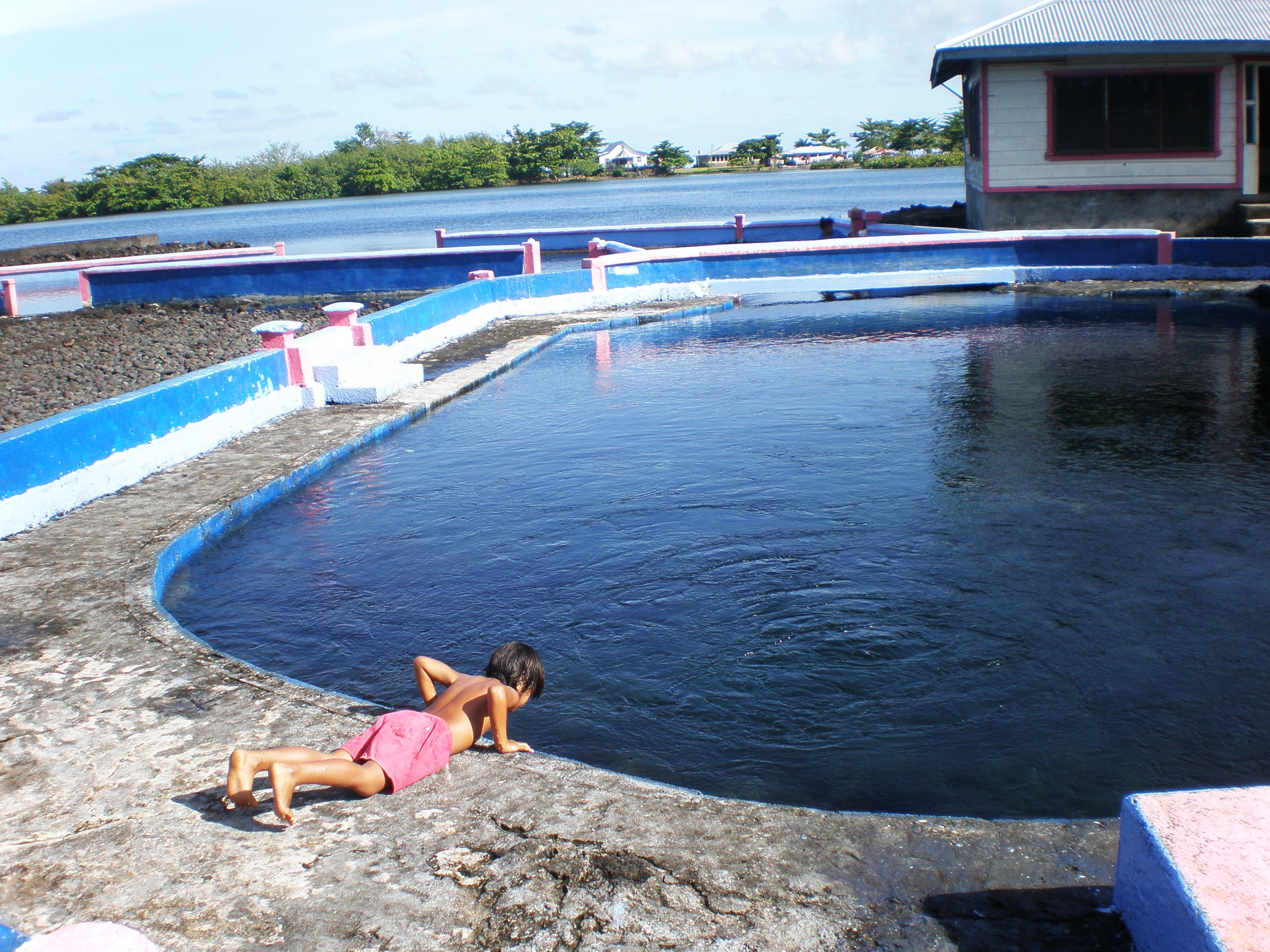
Child at the Mata o le Alelo pool in Matavai village, Savai'i, Samoa

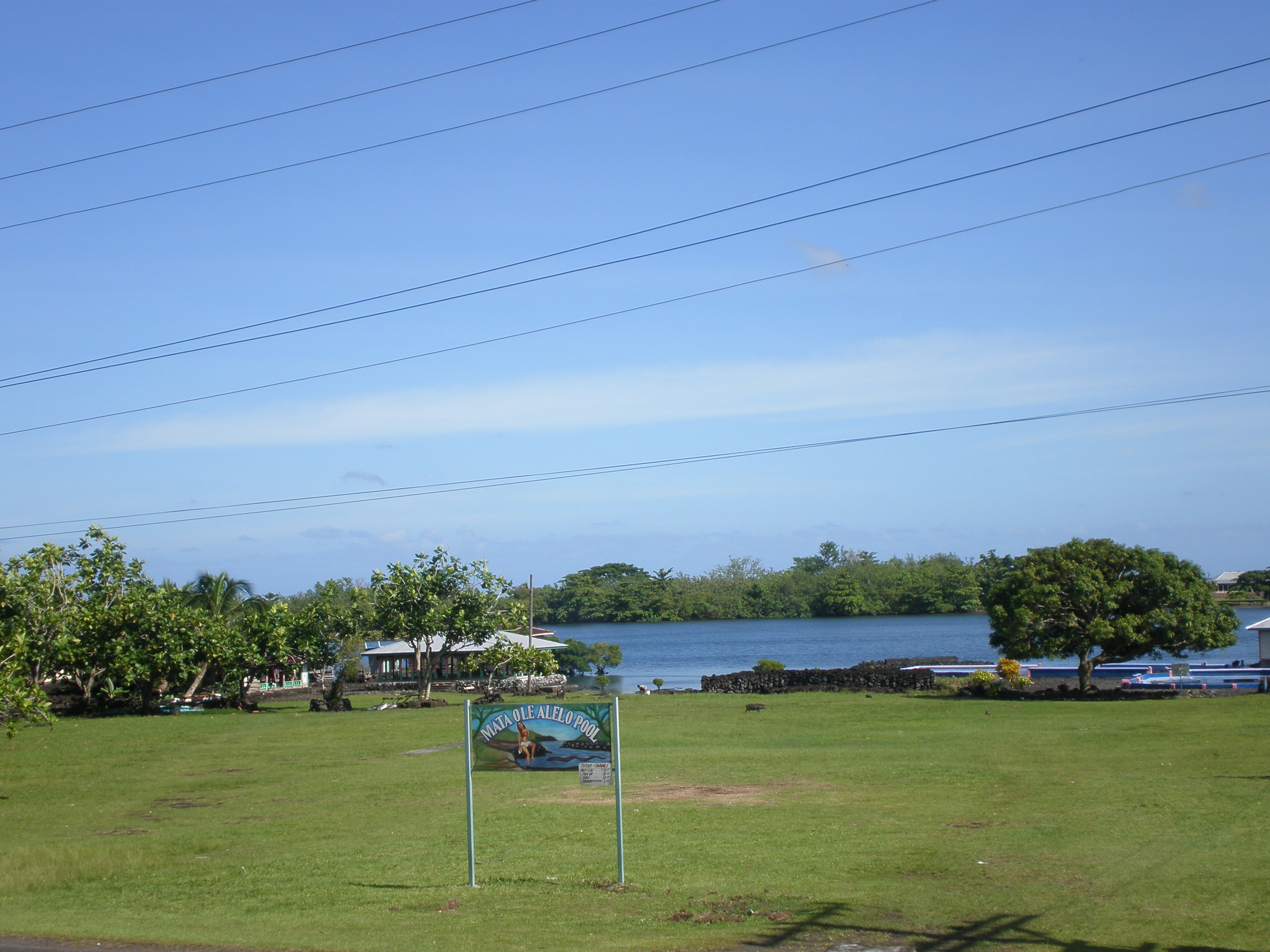
Mata o le Alelo Pool sign by the road in Matavai village, Savai'i, Samoa

Mata o le Alelo is a village pool in Samoa associated with the Polynesian legend Sina and the Eel.

Mata o le Alelo is in the small village of Matavai, in the village district Safune on the central north coast of Savai'i island in Samoa.

The pool is fed by a freshwater spring which flows out towards the sea. The underground spring discharges into a pool that is about 500mm above sea level. Water can be seen boiling up to the surface at one end of the pool.

The natural spring water flows out to a small body of water which flows out to the open ocean towards the west. Towards the north, from the far end of the pool and across the water is the southern side of the small village of Lefagaoali'i situated on a spit of land. The small house beside the pool is looked after by the women of the village who look after the pool and visitors. Overnight stay in the house can be arranged with the village.

The pool is used for drinking water where it bubbles up at the nearer south end. Until recently, the pool was the main source of fresh water for the village. Water is now piped from a larger catchment inland. The far end of the pool which flows out to sea is where children bathe.

== See also ==
- Piula Cave Pool
