= Sina and the Eel =

Samoan origin story

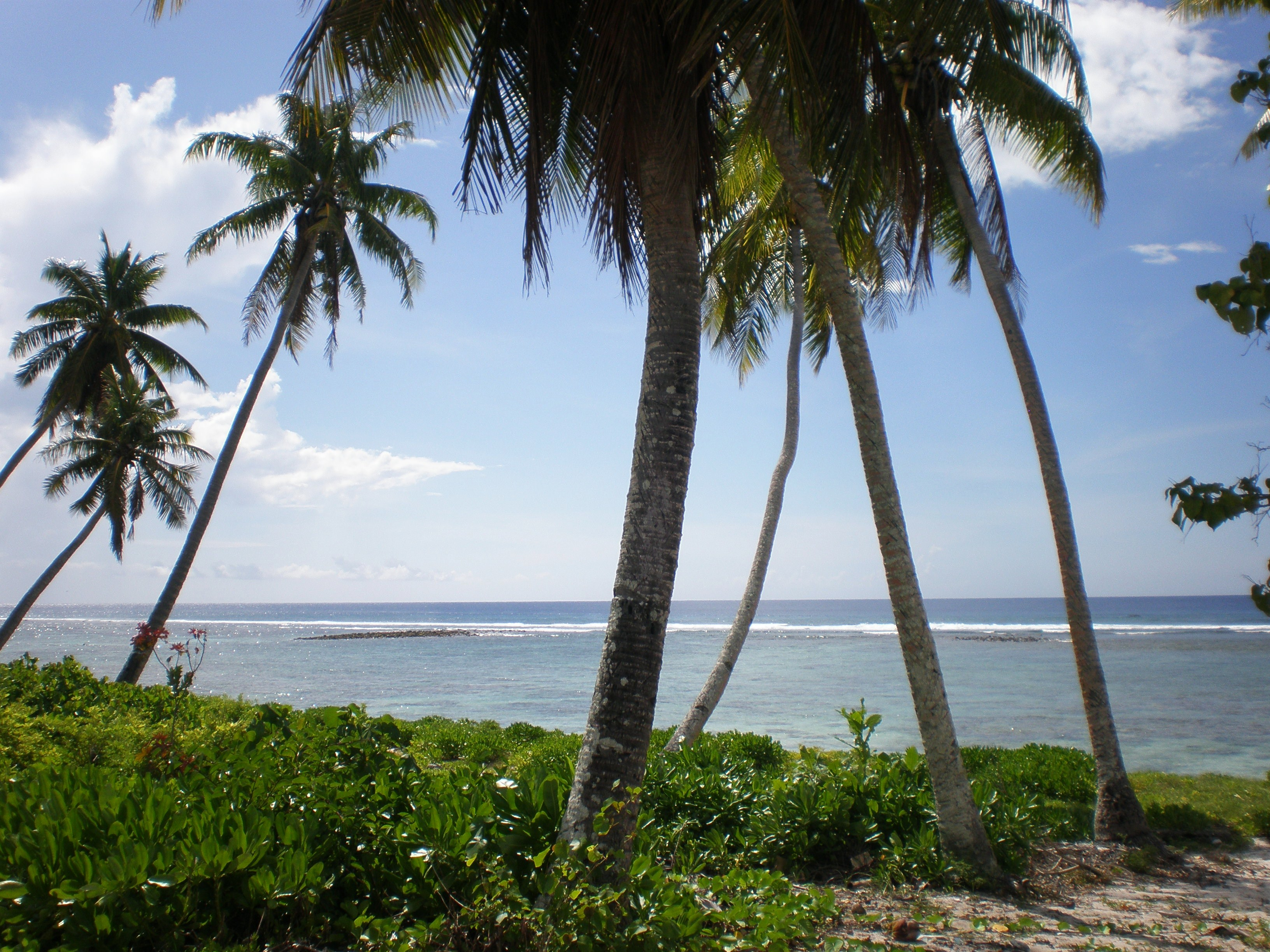
Coconut trees on the coast, Falealupo village, Savai'i Island, Samoa

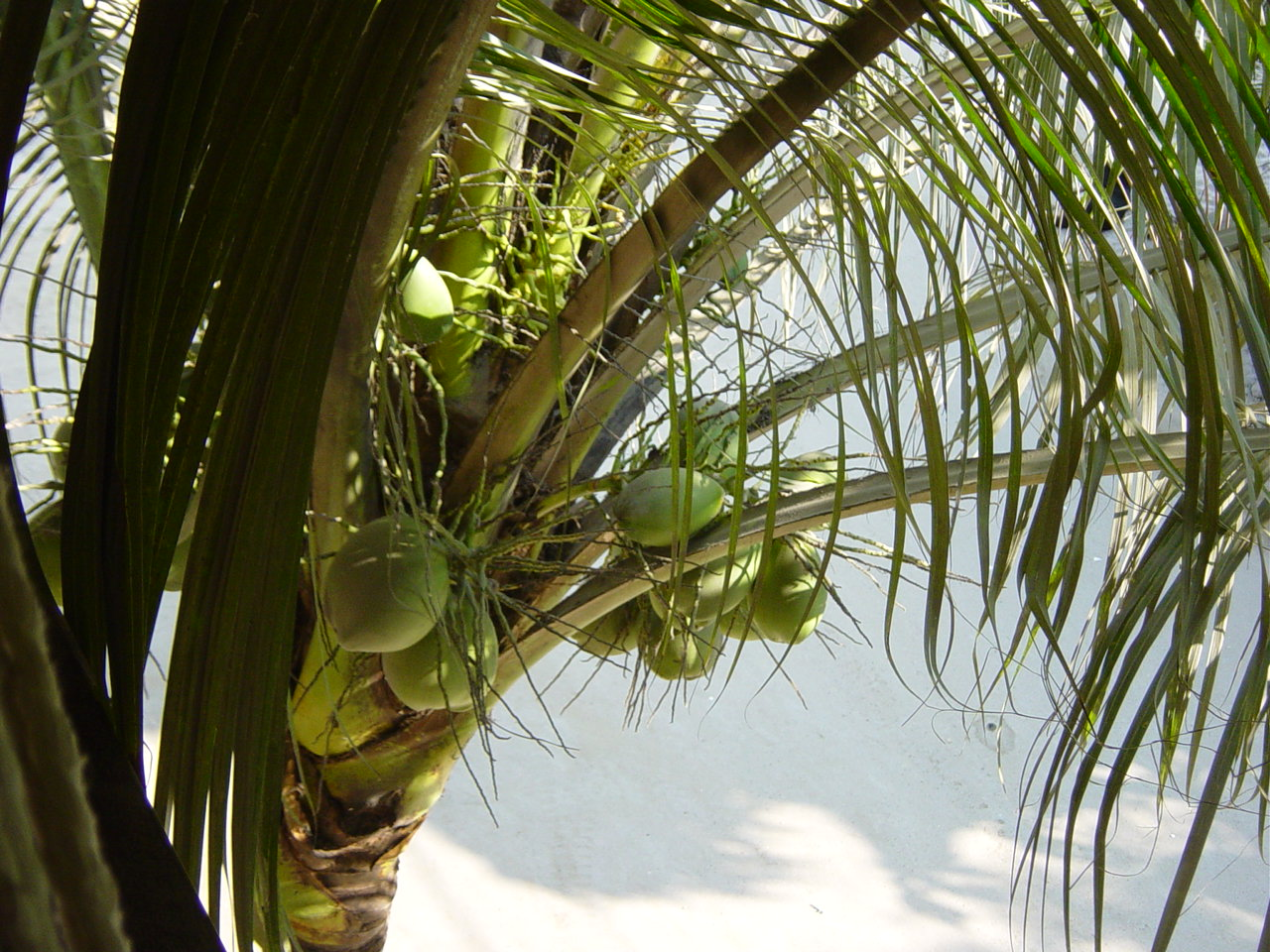
Coconuts

Sina and the Eel is a myth of origins in Samoan mythology, which explains the origins of the first coconut tree.

In the Samoan language the legend is called Sina ma le Tuna. Tuna is the Samoan word for 'eel'.

The story is also well known throughout Polynesia including Tonga, Fiji and Māori in New Zealand.

Different versions of the legend are told in different countries in Oceania. The coconut tree (Cocos nucifera) has many uses and is an important source of food. It is also used for making coconut oil, baskets, sennit rope used in traditional Samoan house building, weaving and for the building of small traditional houses or fale. The dried meat of the coconut or copra has been an important export product and a source of income throughout the Pacific.

The legend of Sina and the Eel is associated with other figures in Polynesian mythology such as Hina, Tinilau, Tagaloa and Nafanua.

Sina is also the name of various female figures in Polynesian mythology. The word sina also means 'white' or silver haired (grey haired in age) in the Samoan language. There is also an old Samoan song called Soufuna Sina based on a Sina legend.

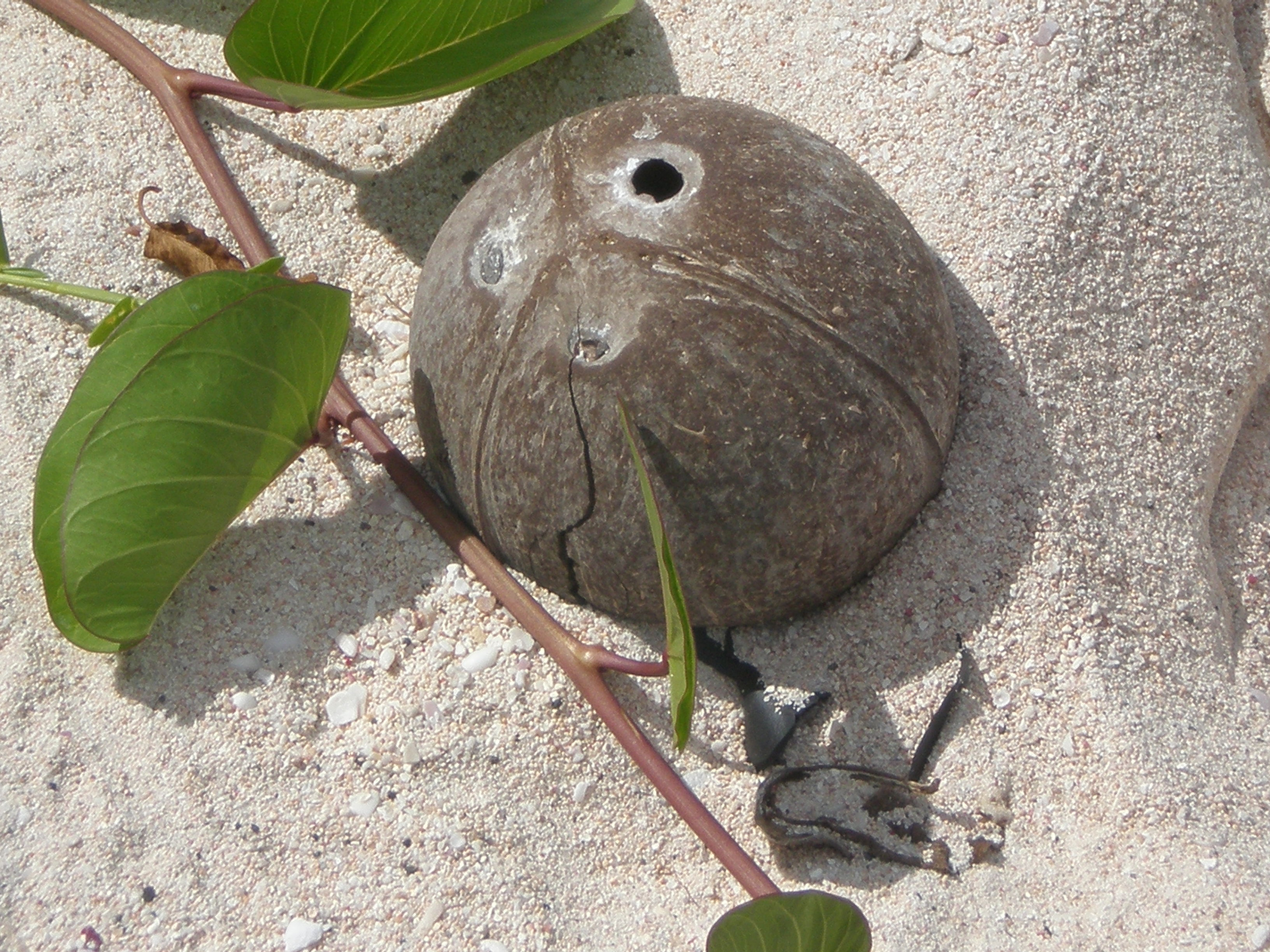
Coconut shell showing the 'two eyes and mouth' of the eel.

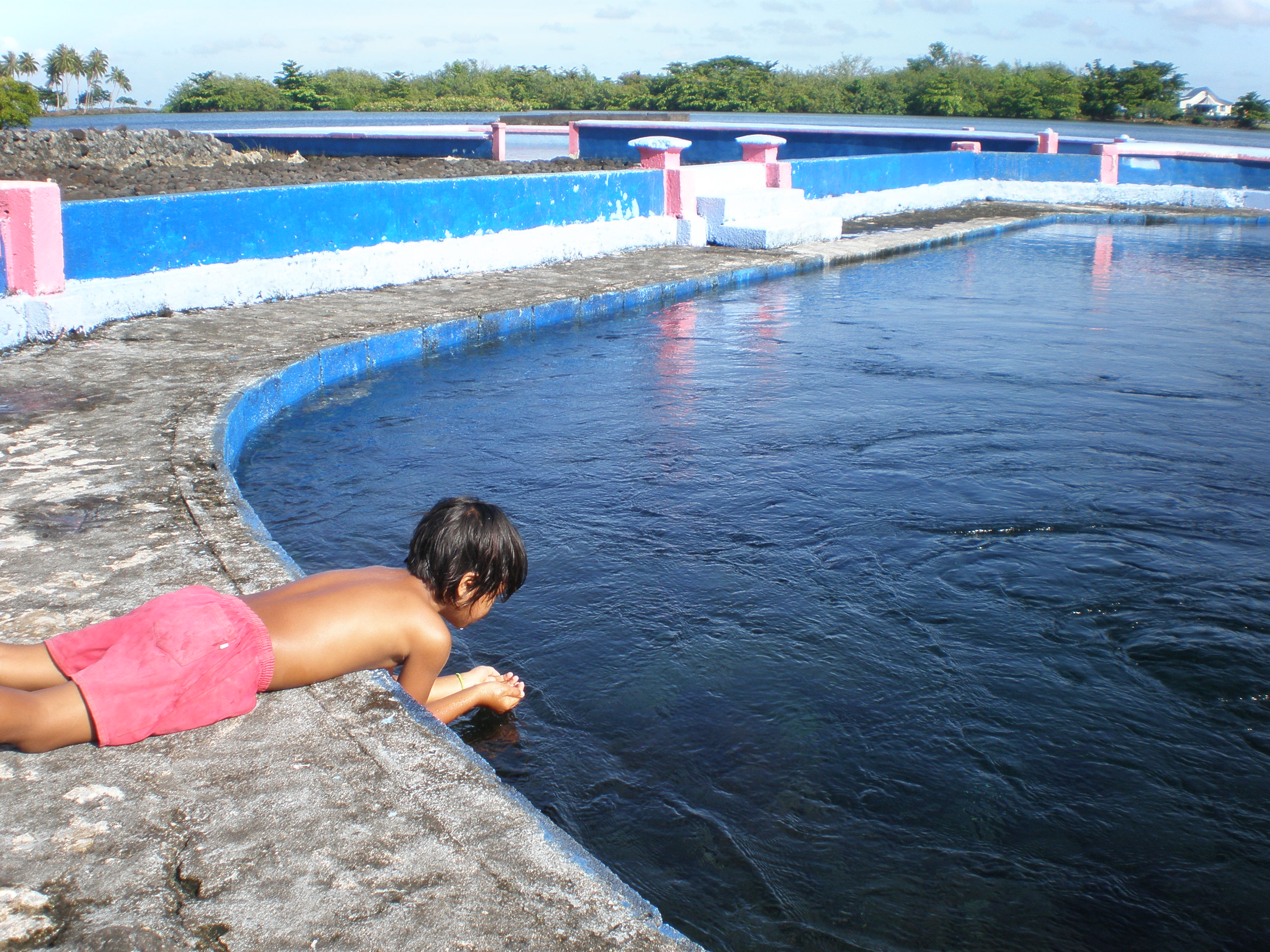
Local child taking a drink of water from the Mata o le Alelo pool in Matavai village, Safune village district, Savai'i

== The story ==
On the island of Savai'i in Samoa, one version of the legend tells of a beautiful girl called Sina whose beauty was known across the Pacific. This beauty reached the Tui Fiti or the King of Fiji who was older than Sina. He took to heart and decided that he shall see to what the fuss was about. Using his Mana (Magic) he transformed himself to an eel and went to the village of which Sina resided. As he got to the village pool, he had seen the beauty that is Sina.

However, when Sina looked into the pool, she saw the eel staring up at her.

Angry, she cried 'You stare at me, with eyes like a demon!' (Samoan: E pupula mai, ou mata o le alelo!). But quickly Sina noticed that the eel was very nice and made it her pet. Years and years passed and the Tui Fiti grew old and with it his magic. He had grown weak and decided to reveal himself. He explained to Sina that he was once the King of Fiji and had come to see her beauty but knew that he had no chance due to his age. He then asked Sina to plant his head in the ground. Sina followed the eel's request, and planted its head in the ground. A coconut tree grew from the ground. When the husk is removed from a coconut, there are three round marks which appear like the face of the fish with two eyes and a mouth. One of the marks is pierced for drinking the coconut, and hence when Sina takes a drink, she is kissing the eel.

In Samoa, the fresh spring pool Mata o le Alelo in the small village of Matavai, Safune, is associated with the legend of Sina and the Eel. The pool is named after Sina's words to the eel in the legend. The pool is open to visitors.

=== Different versions ===
- Another version of the story says that Sina was from the village of Laloata on the island of Upolu, and her father's name was Pai.
- On Mangaia in the Cook Islands the version of the story is about a beautiful woman named ‘Ina-moe-Aitu who lived in a cave near Tamarua village and bathed in a stream in her cave.

== In popular culture ==
- The song "You're Welcome" from the 2016 Walt Disney Pictures film Moana references Sina and the Eel, but with the Polynesian demigod Maui having killed an eel and buried its guts in the ground to grow coconut trees. While singing the song to Moana, Maui plays with a coconut that has three round marks on its surface.
- Although it goes unspoken in the film, the credits list Moana's mother as "Sina." During the song "Where You Are," Sina is shown teaching Moana how to harvest coconuts and use the various parts of the coconut tree.
