= Sasina, Samoa =

Sasina
- Village
- Location within Samoa
- Coordinates: 13°27′S 172°26′W
- Country: Samoa
- District: Gagaʻifomauga

Population (2016)
  - Total: 568
- Time zone: UTC+13:00

Sasina is a village on the north coast of Savai'i island in Samoa. It is situated on the central north coast of the island in the district of Gagaʻifomauga and the electoral district of Gagaʻifomauga 3. The population is 568.

The village is part of a conservation area which includes the village of Aopo. There is a primary school with a new assembly hall renovated by engineers from the United States, Australia and New Zealand under the US Navy's Pacific Partnership programme of the Pacific Fleet.

== Tourism Development ==
In 2008, an American company South Pacific Development Group (SPDG) obtained a 120-year lease for 600 acres (2.4 km^{2}) of prime oceanfront customary land in Sasina, to build a luxury resort estimated to cost $450 – $500 million US dollars. The announcement raised concern among environmental group O Le Si'osi'omaga Society. The size of the acreage and duration of the lease is unprecedented in Samoa, where 80% of the land is customary, 6% freehold and the rest under the government.
