= Olaf Frederick Nelson =

Samoan politician

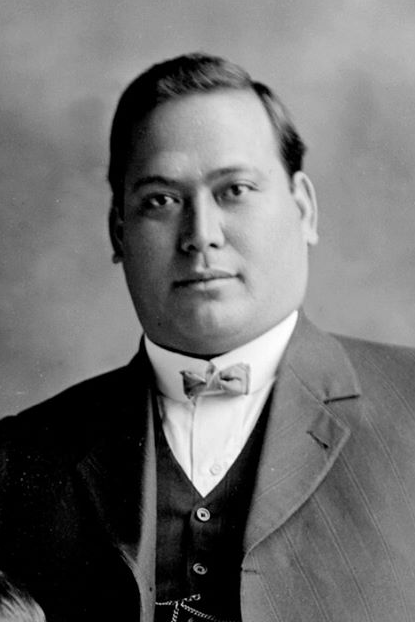
- Born: 24 February 1883; Safune, Savaiʻi
- Died: 28 February 1944; Apia
- Spouse: Rosabel Nelson
- Children: 6, including Olive Virginia Malienafau
- Father: August Nelson

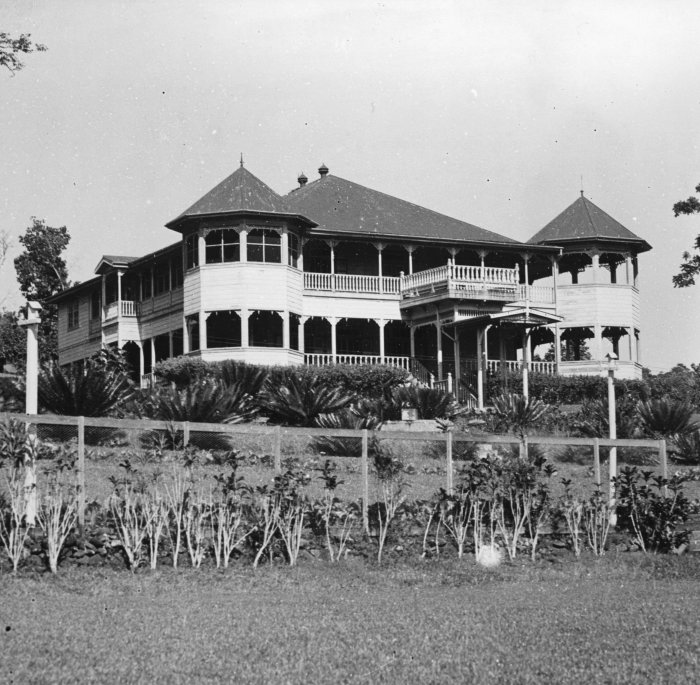
Nelson residence in Tuaefu, around 1936

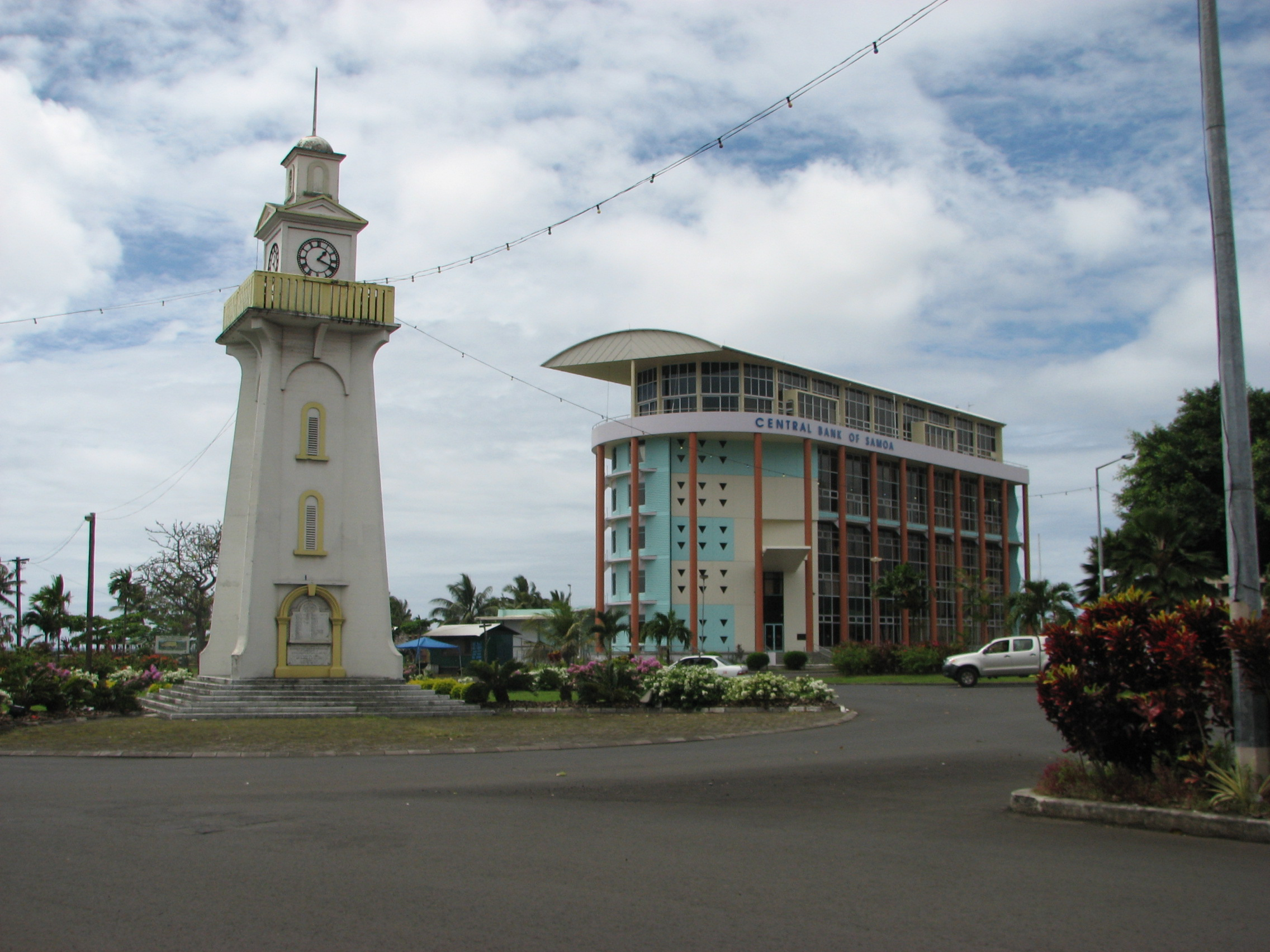
The Clock Tower in Apia, a gift from the Nelson Family.

Ta'isi Olaf Frederick Nelson (24 February 1883 – 28 February 1944) was a Samoan businessman and politician. He was one of the founding leaders of the anti-colonial Mau movement.

== Biography ==
Nelson was born on 24 February 1883 in Safune on the island of Savai'i to Swedish trader August Nelson and his Samoan wife, Sina Tugaga, whose family had links to the Sa Tupua, a prominent chiefly family. His name Ta'isi is a matai chief title from his mother's family from the Savai'i village of Asau. Nelson grew up in the family's home village of Faleolo until the age of eight, when he was sent to the Marist Brothers School in Apia. He left the school at the age of thirteen and became an apprentice at the DH & PG firm. He worked at DH & PH for four years, during which time he founded Samoa's first brass band.

After leaving DH & PG, Nelson returned to Savai'i and took over his father's business, which had started in 1895 under the name - Nelson and Robertson Limited. He expanded his father's copra trading business throughout the islands, and by the time he was thirty-five, Nelson was one of the wealthiest members of the Apia community. He was influential in both the Samoan and European communities.

Under German rule, the colonial administrators treated Nelson as an equal, but after New Zealand seized control in 1914, Nelson was excluded and alienated by the new government. Despite being elected to the Legislative Council in 1924, he could do little as he and the other elected members were constantly overruled by the more numerous government appointees. This treatment turned Nelson into one of the major forces in the Samoan independence movement, known as the Mau.

In May 1927 Nelson founded a newspaper, the Samoa Guardian, to support its claims. In response to his growing public dissent, the New Zealand administration tried to brand Nelson as unscrupulous and a trouble maker. The colonial administration's desperation to silence Nelson led them to exile him in January 1928, along with two other part-European members of the Mau. During his five years of exile, Nelson took his protests as far as the League of Nations in Geneva. He returned to Samoa in May 1933, and continued his advocacy. General Hart, the New Zealand administrator, demanded that Nelson be excluded from any meeting (fono) with the leadership of the Mau. The Mau insistence that Nelson should be one of its delegates. General Hart ordered police raids on the Mau's headquarters at Vaimoso and Nelson's residence at Tuaefu, which occurred on 15 November 1933. Eight Samoan chiefs, leaders of the Mau, who were members of a conference of 100 assembled at Tuatuanu’u were arrested on charges of collecting monies for unlawful purposes and engaging in Mau activities. A week later a further 7 chiefs were arrested at Savaii.

Six months after his return to Samoa, Nelson was convicted of 3 charges of being connected to the Mau, for which he was sentenced to ten additional years in exile as well as eight months imprisonment in New Zealand. His appeal to the Full Court of the New Zealand Supreme Court quashed the sentence of imprisonment but upheld the ten years of exile. The Privy Council in London rejected his appeal. However, his exile was cut short in 1936, after Labour won the New Zealand general election in 1935. He returned to Samoa on 22 July 1936, and helped in the signing of the co-operation agreement between Samoan leaders and the New Zealand administration. He was subsequently elected to the Legislative Council in 1938, and re-elected in 1941.

Nelson died in 1944, and it was not until 1962 that his dream of Samoan independence was realised.

== Legacy ==
Ta'isi had six daughters. Viopapa Lucy, Irene Gustave Noue, Olive Nelson (Malienafau), Joyce Rosabel Piliopo, Sina Hope and Calmar Josephine Taufau, and one son, Ta'isi who died as a result of the influenza epidemic in 1919 aged 4. Malienafau was the first Pacific Island graduate of the University of Auckland, graduating with a law degree in 1936.

Ta'isi's daughter Noue went on to marry Tupua Tamasese Mea'ole, who became Joint Head of State when Samoa attained Independence in 1962. They sired Olf "Efi" Nelson who went on to become Tui Atua Tupua Tamasese Tupuola Ta'isi Efi, the third Prime Minister of Samoa and from 2007 to 2017, the Head of State of Samoa. His other grandson Misa Telefoni Retzlaff (Hermann Theodor Retzlaff) was in parliament from 1988 to 2011, and the Deputy Prime Minister of Samoa from 2001 to 2011. Retzlaff's son is Lemalu Herman Retzlaff (Taisi's great-grandson), who was appointed Attorney General of Samoa in 2016.

Ta-isi's grand-daughter is Dr Viopapa Annandale–Atherton. In 1964, she was the first Samoan woman to graduate in medicine from the University of Otago and has committed her career to improving the health and welfare of women and children in the Pacific Islands.

The Nelson Memorial Public Library was donated to the Samoan people by the Nelson Family in Ta'isi's memory.

== Sources ==
- O'Brien, Patricia. Tautai: Sāmoa, World History and the Life of Ta'isi O. F. Nelson (Honolulu: University of Hawai'i Press, 2017)
- O'Brien, Patricia. "Ta'isi O. F. Nelson and Sir Maui Pomare: Samoans and Maori Reunited", Journal of Pacific History, 49:1 2014
- Wendt, Albert. Guardians and Wards (A study of the origins, causes, and the first two years of the Mau in Western Samoa.), New Zealand Electronic Text Centre. Accessed 26 March 2024.
