= Faletagaloa =

Coordinates: 13°28′S 172°26′W

- Village
- Interactive map of Faletagaloa
- Country: Samoa
- District: Gagaifomauga

Population (2016)
  - Total: 378
- Time zone: -11

Faletagaloa is a village on the central north coast of Savai'i island in Samoa.

The village is in the traditional sub-district of Safune in the Gagaifomauga electoral division. It has a population of 378.
