= Paia (Samoa) =

Village in Samoa

Coordinates: 13°28′21.46″S 172°24′19.24″W

Paia is a village on the island of Savai'i in Samoa. It is situated inland in the central north of the island in the district of Gagaʻifomauga and the electoral district of Gagaʻifomauga 2. The population is 280.
