= Safune =

- Village district
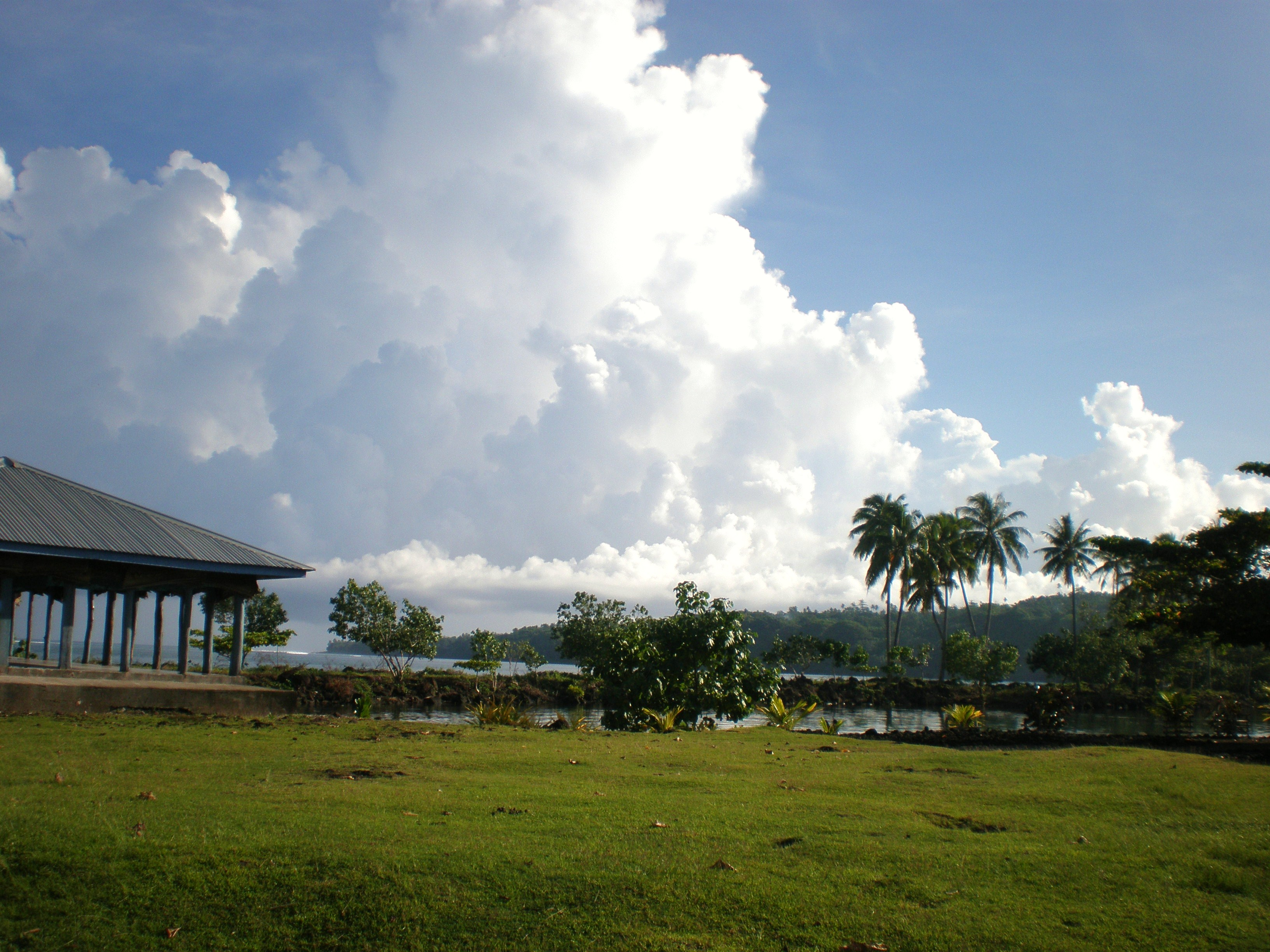
- View in Safune village district, 2009

- Location within Samoa
- Coordinates: 13°28′14.46″S 172°25′28.35″W
- Country: Samoa
- District: Gagaifomauga

Population (2006)
  - Total: 786
- Time zone: -11
- Includes villages; Matavai, Faletagaloa, Fatuvalu

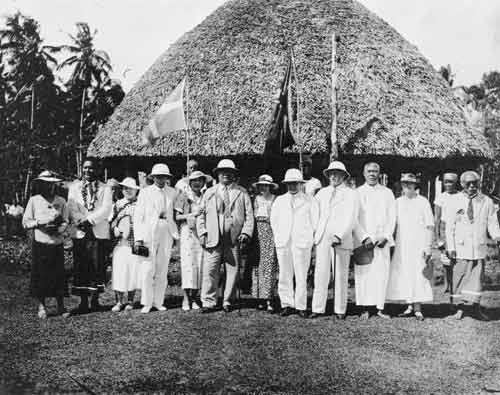
Olaf Frederick Nelson (middle, sixth from left) with his daughters on their return to Samoa from exile in New Zealand, 1933

Safune is a traditional village district on the central north coast of Savai'i island in Samoa. It lies within the electoral constituency of Gaga'ifomauga. Safune is the birthplace of Mau leader Olaf Frederick Nelson and the filming location of Moana (1926 film), one of the first documentaries made in the world. The Mata o le Alelo pool associated with the Sina and the Eel Polynesian legend is also in Safune.

The villages within Safune are Matavai, Faletagaloa and Fatuvalu as well as smaller traditional land boundaries, Faleolo and Lalomati.

== Olaf Frederick Nelson ==
Olaf Frederick Nelson, a leader of the Mau, Samoa's independence movement during the colonial era in the early 1900s, was born in Safune on 24 February 1883. Nelson's father was a Swedish immigrant trader. His mother Sina Masoe was from Safune. In 1900, at the age of 17, Nelson worked for his father's store in Safune. When his father retired in 1903, Nelson expanded the family business. In 1904, he purchased a boat called 'Lily' to ship copra to sell in Apia. By 1906 he was shipping directly to Sydney. He set up trading stations on Savai'i and Upolu. Nelson went on to become one of the wealthiest men in Samoa. In 1928, the colonial administration exiled Nelson to New Zealand for his leadership in the Mau movement.

== Samoa mythology ==
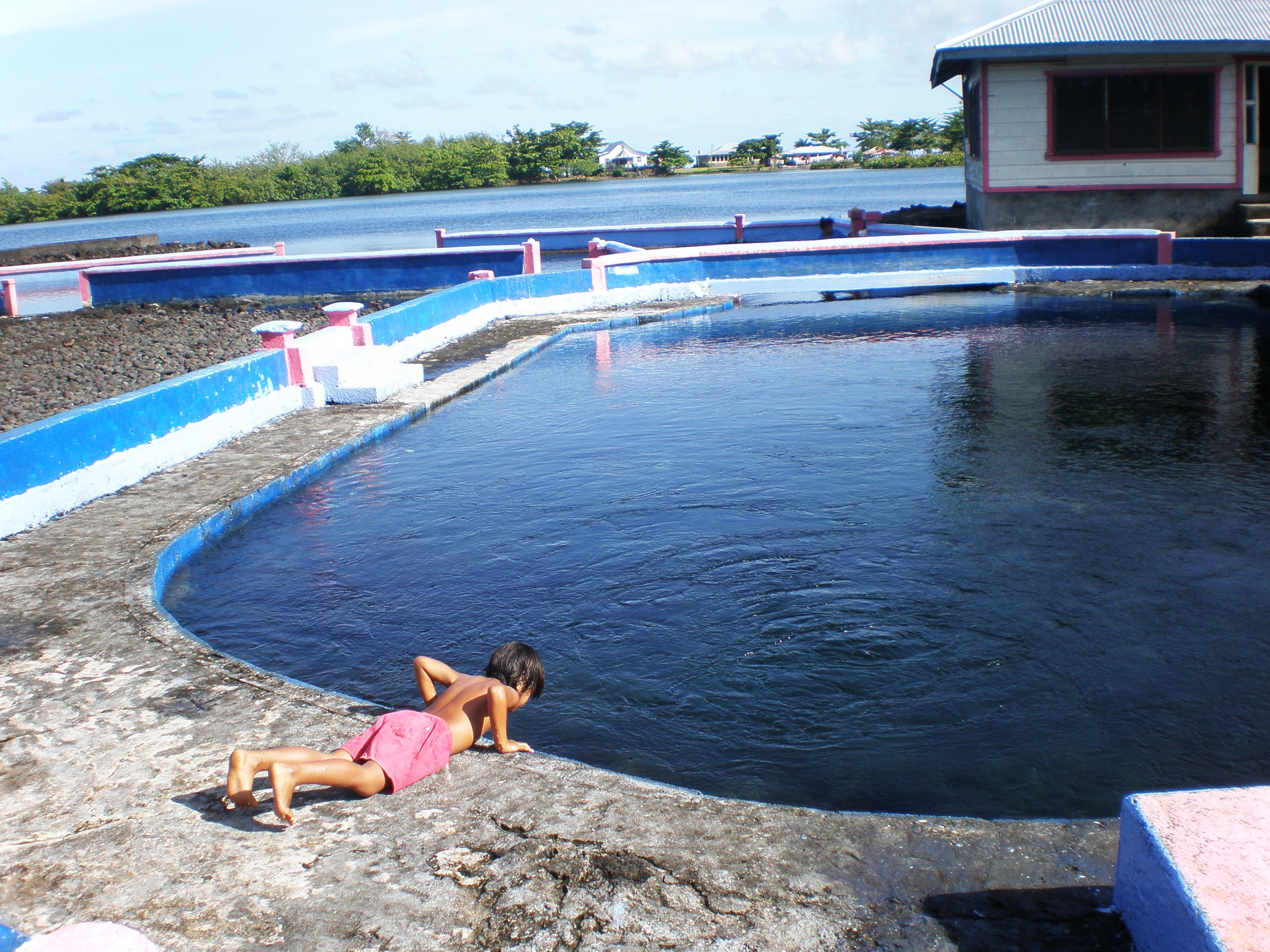
Child at Mata o le Alelo pool, Matavai village

In Samoan mythology, the fresh spring pool Mata o le Alelo, in the village of Matavai in Safune is associated with the Polynesian legend of Sina and the Eel. The pool is looked after by women in the village and is open to visitors and tourists. The legend explains the origins of the first coconut tree.

== Pre-history ==
The name Sa Fune (the family of Fune) is associated with a man called Fune, a warrior who established his court in a number of villages in Savai'i. Fune is believed to have been the first holder of the Le Tagaloa chief title in the 10th century.

Another story relates that Fune and Fotu were the children of Lafai. Fune founded Safune and Fotu founded Safotu. Both villages were warlike. People from Safune had a war with the people of Faleata and many people were killed.

== London Missionary Society ==
The London Missionary Society, which was established by evangelical Anglicans and Nonconformists, largely Congregationalist in outlook, was active in the 19th century. Rev. Dr. Alexander MacDonald and his wife Selina Dorcas (née Blomfield) settled at Safune in August 1837. He left the LMS in 1850 when he accepted a position with the Congregational church in Auckland, New Zealand.

== The making of a film in Safune ==
Moana (1926), one of the first documentary films made in the world, was filmed in Safune and directed by Robert J. Flaherty who lived in the village for more than a year. Flaherty was in Samoa from April 1923 to December 1924. He went to Samoa with his wife Frances Flaherty, their three young children, a red-haired Irish nursemaid (nicknamed 'Mumu' or 'Red' by the Samoans) and Flaherty's younger brother David Flaherty who would act as the film production manager. The tropical landscape of Safune was very different from the frozen icy setting of Flaherty's previous film Nanook of the North.

Frederick O'Brien (1869 - 1932), a successful travel writer in America in the 1920s (Atolls of the Sun, Mystic Isles of the South Seas) had stayed for several months in Safune and recommended the village to Flaherty as a location for his film. O'Brien's first travel book White Shadows in the South Seas (1919) had created a lot of public interest in the South Pacific among Americans.

When the Flahertys arrived in Safune they stayed in a house that was a former trading post set among coconut trees. This was the same house in which O'Brien had stayed two years earlier. Their host was a German trader Felix David, who had lived in Samoa for many years. The German had trained as an opera singer in his youth in Europe and provided evening recitals in the village including operatic renditions of Siegfried's death scene from Götterdämmerung.

Flaherty made the film in Safune with the approval of the chiefs (matai), of whom the filmmaker noted as being proud of their home being chosen as the location. The German trader David acted as his go-between with the locals. The villagers called Flaherty 'Ropati' or 'Lopati,' a transliteration of 'Robert.'

Sixteen tonnes of film equipment arrived in the village. A cave in the village was converted into a film processing laboratory and two young men, Samuelo and Imo, from the village, were trained to work there. Flaherty exposed about 240,000 feet of negative on the Safune family, a large amount of footage developed and printed by hand in a cave with two Samoan boys who had no prior film training. After a year of filming, a problem showed up in the developed negative, caused by the salinity content of the water from the pool in the cave laboratory. The problem was fixed by using rainwater, but prior footage had to be filmed again. The whole of the film as it is seen today was shot between July and December in 1924.

Flaherty cast village people in the film. 'Moana,' which means 'ocean,' was the name of the lead male character The role of 'Moana' was played by a local boy "Umi Ta'avale Tugaga" of the village Safune Faletagaloa - Matai title “Umi”. The film showed the young hero getting a pe'a, a rite of passage, and the traditional Samoan tattoo for males. The pe'a tattoo (the Samoan word pe'a is also the word for a flying fox or fruit bat) took six weeks to complete and the master tattooist (Tufuga ta tatau) was from Asau. A young boy, whose name was also Pe'a, from Faletagaloa village in Safune, played the role of Moana's younger brother. Young Pe'a grew up and became a chief with the title Taule'ale'ausumai. A village girl Fa'agase, from Lefagaoali'i village, played the lead female role and love interest. The film also showed the traditional process of making 'siapo' or tapa, an organic material of bark cloth. The old woman making 'tapa' in the film was Tu'ugaita of the Pa'ia'aua family in Matavai village, where the Mata o le Alelo pool is situated.

In the evenings, Flaherty screened movies in the village. These included Der Golem (1915 horror) and Paramount movies Miracle Man and It Pays to Advertise (1919). One time during filming, Flaherty became sick while he was at Tufu, a small village at the west end of Savai'i island. A messenger was sent to the village of Fagamalo to radio help from the capital Apia on Upolu island. From the village of Tufu, Flaherty was carried on a litter to the village of Falealupo, where he was cared for by his wife and two Europeans living there, Newton Rowe and a Catholic missionary, Father Haller. Five days later, a boat with a doctor from Upolu arrived at Falealupo. Flaherty and his wife were taken to Upolu where the filmmaker recovered before returning to Safune.

By the time Flaherty and his family departed Safune, they had formed a close kinship bond with the people of the village.

== Other notable people ==
- Safuneitu'uga Pa'aga Neri, matai and politician representing Gagaifomauga No. 2 electoral constituency. Current Minister of Communication and Technology in the Parliament of Samoa.
- Darius Visser

Cricket world record holder
