= Archaeology of Samoa =

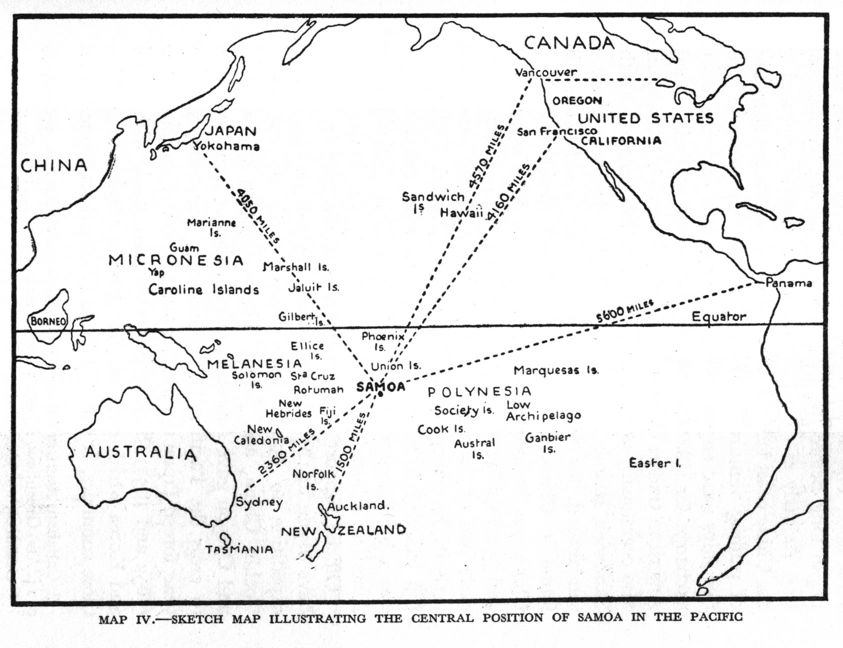
Sketch map showing the central location of the Samoa Islands in the Pacific.

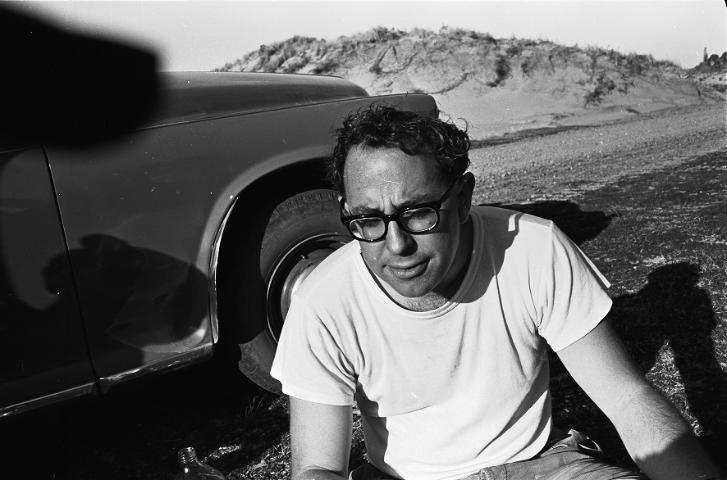
Roger Curtis Green, a leading archaeologist in Samoa (1964 photo in New Zealand)

Archaeology of Samoa began with the first systematic survey of archaeological remains on Savai'i island by Jack Golson in 1957. Since then, surveys and studies in the rest of Samoa have uncovered major findings of settlements, stone and earth mounds including star mounds, Lapita pottery remains and pre-historic artifacts.

An important part of archaeology in Samoa and Oceania involves finding the answer to the origins of Polynesians, ongoing research which is being undertaken in conjunction with other fields including linguistics and genetics.

The oldest date so far from pre-historic remains in Samoa has been calculated by New Zealand scientists to a likely true age of circa 3,000 BP (Before Present) from a Lapita site at Mulifanua during the 1970s.

== History ==
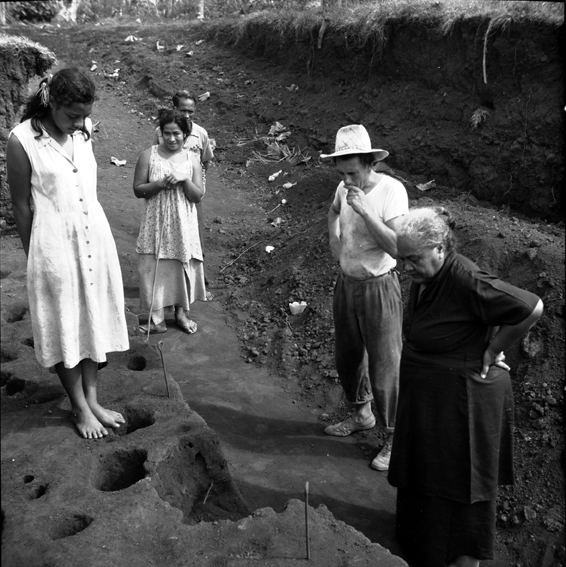
Jack Golson excavation site in Vailele with a visit from members of the I'iga Pisa family, 1957.

Earlier accounts of 'earthmounds' and 'monumental architecture' were known but no scientific surveys were carried out until Golson's in-depth work in 1957. Golson also carried out field work on Upolu where he discovered the first pottery sherds in Samoa at Vailele village on the island's north coast. At the 10th Pacific Science Congress in Honolulu in 1961, archaeologists decided to make a coordinated approach in investigating the region's pre-history.

During 1963-1964, this work was carried out by an international team led by Roger Curtis Green under the Polynesian Archaeology Programme of Auckland University. Building on Golson's surveys, the team carried out field work on the islands of Savai'i, Upolu and Apolima. Another team leader was New Zealand archaeologist Janet Davidson who has made major contributions to the field of archaeology in Samoa and the rest of the Pacific. Green and Davidson laid the groundwork for archaeology in Samoa. Among the many findings of this project were ceramics on Upolu and Apolima. However, a key finding near the end of this trip was the discovery of Lapita pottery remains at Mulifanua with radio carbon dates of 930-800 BC. Up to 2008, all known pottery in Samoa is 'plain ware' except for those excavated at Mulifanua. An important part of Davidson's work in Samoa over the years focused on settlement patterns before European contact. She became the first to make a case based on archaeological field work for the distribution of a much greater Samoan population in the 17th and 18th centuries AD. Early population estimates in the 19th century had been vastly different.

There were other archaeologists who carried out important field work in Samoa, including American Jesse D. Jennings and Richard Holmer in the 1970s. Jennings led studies at Mt Olo Plantation on Upolu and inland from Sapapali'i on Savai'i. Extensive pre-historic settlement ruins were surveyed, mapped and excavated in August, September and October 1974, 1976 and 1977 under the University of Utah Samoan Archaeological Program. From 1978 to 1979, further field work was carried out with extensive surveys of a pre-historic settlement in the Palauli district. This survey at Palauli was done by Gregory Jackmond, an American Peace Corps volunteer who had previously done field work of pre-historic ruins inland from Sapapali'i village.

In 2002-2004 extensive excavations were carried out at the Pulemelei mound in Savai'i under the leadership of the Swedish archaeologist Helene Martinsson-Wallin (Kon-Tiki Museum research institute/Gotland University) in collaboration with Paul Wallin (Kon-Tiki Museum/Gotland University) and Geoffrey Clark (Australian National University). These excavations and subsequent field studies by Martinsson-Wallin at the Letolo plantation, Malaefono Starmound and Fale o le Fe'e, led to a collaboration with the National University of Samoa to create an archaeology programme.

Many other scholars contributed to the field of archaeology in Samoa before 1957 including Māori historian Te Rangi Hīroa (also known as Sir Peter Henry Buck) and Derek Freeman who carried out field work at Vailele and the Falemauga Caves on Upolu while he was a school teacher in Samoa during the early 1940s.

== Key sites ==
=== Savai'i ===
Key sites in field work on Savai'i island include prehistoric settlements situated inland at Sapapali'i, extensive village settlements in Palauli, where the Pulemelei Mound is situated and a midden site at the village of Siutu on the south coast. Archaeological work at Sapapali'i was carried out by Jackmond, who surveyed a 20-hectare (49-acre) area and discovered extensive prehistoric ruins. The data from Jackmond's work at Sapapali'i tended to replicate the data collected at the Mt Olo Plantation site on Upolu with similar stone walls, raised walkways and platforms. One important difference were the greater number of earth ovens uncovered at the Savai'i site. The team at the Mt Olo site had previously theorised that earth ovens were a sign of social ranking and status. When these surveys were completed in 1976, Jackmond's Peace Corp work was extended for a further two years and he carried out field work on the extensive prehistoric settlements in Palauli district. Earlier mapping of Savai'i including the Pulemelei mound had been carried out by S.D. Scott and Alistair G. Buist in 1969. Their field work on Savai'i in 1969 showed archaeological remains of dense inland settlements prior to European contact in Safotu, Safune and Fagamalo (Matautu village district, Savai'i Island), on the north coast of the island.

==== Letolo ====
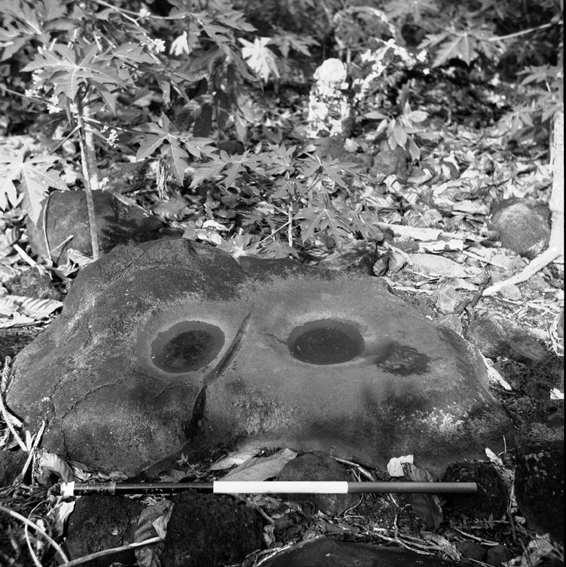
Grinding stones

The prehistoric settlement at Letolo is situated in the Palauli district on the south coast at the east end of Savai'i. The site is situated on land which is known in modern times as the Nelson Plantation under the Nelson Corporation Board. During colonialism in the late 19th century, the land came under German ownership and sold to a Swedish trader August Nilspeter Gustav Nelson, who married a Samoan woman and ran a trading post in Safune. In recent years, court cases have resulted between chiefs in Palauli and the Nelson family over ownership of the land.

Entry into the plantation is over the bridge at the west end of Vailoa, the capital of Palauli.

Jackmond's survey during 1977 - 1978 at Letolo covered an area from the south coast to gently sloping land 3 km inland to an elevation of 135m at the northern edge. The area is bounded on the east side by the Faleata River and on the west side by the Seugagogo River. Within the 198.8-hectare (491-acre) area surveyed, approximately 3,000 features of human manufacture were recorded, including foundation platforms, 64.6 km of stone fences, primary and secondary walkways, and some 300 house sites. A total of 1059 platforms were recorded; the largest of these is Pulemelei Mound which had previously been reported by other archaeologists. The Pulemelei mound is 50 m × 61 m and 12 m high. From the ground, it slopes inward and upwards, in steps, to a flat level top. From the top of Pulemelei, one can view the sea looking south. Estimated dates of construction place it between 1100 and 1400 AD. In general, the platforms averaged 236 ± 251 m^{2} in basal area and 46 ± 52 cm in height. The platforms were rectangular or oval in shape, except for two small star mounds 7.8 m (7 arms) and 10 m (5 arms) in diameter and 50 cm in height. All the mounds are constructed of basalt stones and boulders.

The archaeological survey showed that there were once literally hundreds of household units, which extended far inland beyond the mapped area, past the Pulemelei stone mound. The main pathway through the settlement went on to cross the mountainous interior of Savai'i in an 'old road' mentioned by early missionaries.

Extensive archaeological excavations were carried out at Pulemelei mound during the years 2002-2004 by Helene Martinsson-Wallin The Kon-Tiki Museum/Gotland University and adjunct professor at The National University of Samoa. The excavations showed that Pulemelei mound started to be built around 700–900 years ago as a 60x65 meter large and 3 meter high platform which was outlined of cut stone on edge. It was built on top of an earlier settlement that is at least 2000 years old with finds of pot sherds, stone tools and hearths. Around 400–500 years ago the mound was added on with to reach a high of 12 meter and two walkways were constructed in the west and east side of the mound. Pulemelei mound is a central place in a large scale settlement area on the slopes of Palauli that were abandoned in the 18th century.

=== Upolu ===
==== Mulifanua ====
Key sites on Upolu island include the Lapita site at Mulifanua where 4,288 pottery sherds and two Lapita type adzes have been recovered. The site has a true age of circa 3,000 BP based on C14 dating on a shell. The submerged Lapita site at Mulifanua was discovered in 1973 during work carried out to expand the inter-island ferry berth. With changing coastal shorelines over time, scientists studying the site found evidence that the submerged site was once a sandy beach by a lagoon. This is the only site in Samoa where decorated Lapita sherds have been found although Plain Ware pottery remains, associated with Lapita 'culture', have been found in other parts of Samoa, including the first sample found by Golson at Vailele in 1957. The two adzes were discovered in 1988 by Rhys Richards of the New Zealand High Commission in Samoa during examination of pottery sherds with archaeologist Helen M. Leach, fifteen years after the original site discovery.

==== Vailele ====
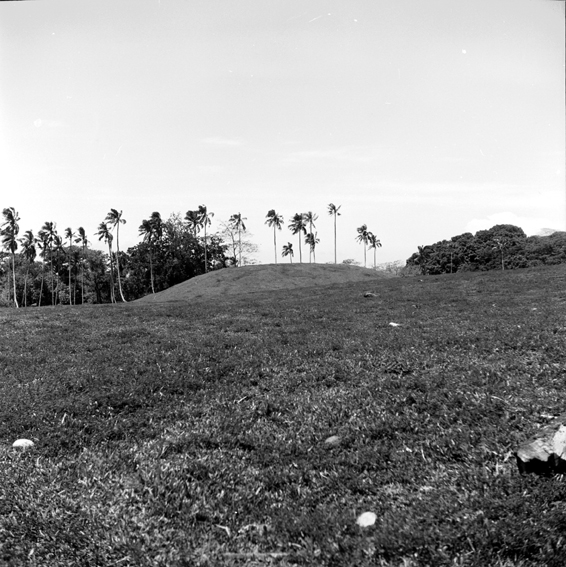
Large mound south of Laupule stream in Vailele, 1957

A large mound, Laupule, at Vailele village on Upolu is comparable to the Pulemelei Mound on Savai'i. In the 1940s, New Zealand anthropologist Derek Freeman, a schoolteacher in Samoa from April 1940 to November 1943, studied earthmounds lying near the Tausala stream which enters the sea between Fagali'i and Vailele. The mounds mainly lay three-quarters of a mile inland at an elevation of 200 ft above sea level. Of the eight mounds in the area, 7 were truncated, rectangular pyramids constructed of earth. The eighth was conical, truncated and made of earth and stone. The largest Laupule, measured 346 ft × 314 ft at the base with a height of 40 ft. Three smaller mounds were situated close to it. All lay on the west side of the Tausala stream. On the other side of the stream were three mounds which all came under the name Tapuitea (evening star). The largest measured 384 ft (which made it longer than the main Laupule mound), with a width of 235 ft and height of 15 ft. According to oral tradition, the Laupule mound was associated with a figure called Tupuivao in the 17th century.

==== Other villages ====
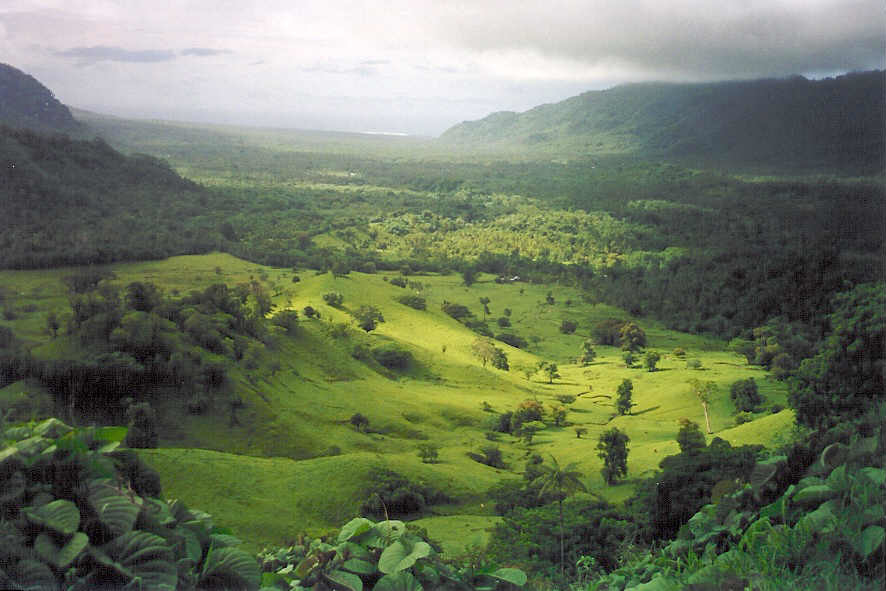
Falefa Valley, looking north from Le Mafa Pass, east Upolu

Other sites on Upolu include archaeological remains found inland at Luatuanu'u (house sites), Lufilufi and Falefa. There were also a scatter of sites on the south coast from Lotofaga to Lepa extending inland two to three kilometers. Janet Davidson spent six months carrying out site surveys on Upolu (1965–1966) in Sasoa'a at Falefa Valley, Lalomanu village in the Aleipata district and at the government owned WSTEC plantation at Mulifanua.

==== Mt Olo ====
Davidson was also the first to examine inland settlements at Mt Olo Plantation, at the west end of Upolu. In 1973, another team, unaware of Davidson's earlier examination, located an extensive area of ruined platforms, walls and walkways. The field work at Mt Olo Plantation was carried out at different periods over three years under the University of Utah Samoan Archaeological Programme.

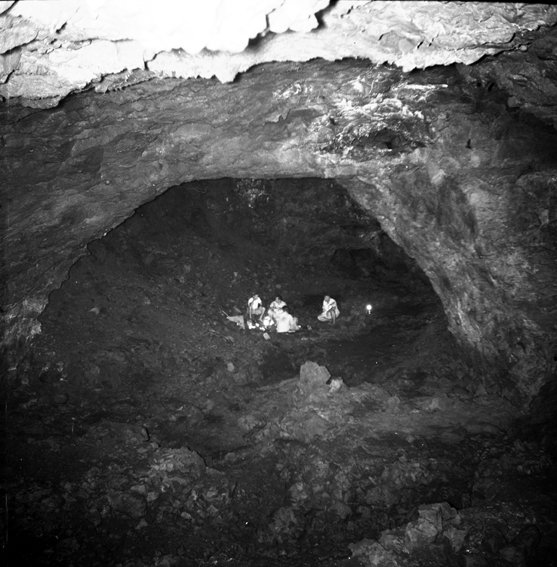
Falemauga Caves showing a large chamber with a group of people inside (1957 photo).

==== Falemauga Caves ====
The Falemauga Caves are situated in Falemauga, an area in central Upolu about five and a half miles south (inland) from the village of Malie on the island's north coast. There is evidence of human occupation in Samoa's prehistory and that the caves were used as a place of refuge by the people of Tuamasaga district. In the Samoan language, the name Falemauga can be broken down into two words, fale which means 'house' and mauga which means 'mountain.' New Zealander Derek Freeman carried out excavations in the early 1940s and published his report in the Journal of the Polynesian Society of New Zealand, in 1944. He found an 'elaborate system of platforms' constructed of lava rocks raised to a height of about 2–3 feet above the cave floor, stone adzes typical of the prehistoric types found in the country, umu cook sites, marine shellfish remains and kitchen middens.

=== Manono Island ===
During the 1970s, the University of Utah Samoan Archaeological Program recovered prehistoric pottery remains at two coastal middens on Manono Island.

=== Settlement patterns ===
Part of Davidson and Green's work was studying the settlement patterns of Samoan communities. Davidson noted, "The archaeologist engaged in site surveys in Samoa is confronted with a bewildering range of archaeological sites which often seem to be continuously distributed over the land". Golson's work in 1957 suggested that settlements occurred inland followed by later settlements along the coast, which had been the predominant pattern since the earliest European arrival in Samoa in the 19th century.
