= Holmer =

Holmer or Holmér is a surname. Notable people with the surname include:

- Gösta Holmér (1891–1983), Swedish decathlete
- Grethe Holmer (1924–2004), Danish actress
- Hans Holmér (1930–2002), Chief of the Swedish National Security Service, Stockholm county administrative chief of police
- M. R. N. Holmer (1875–1957), English university professor and writer who worked in India
- Richard Holmer (born 1945), professor of anthropology at Idaho State University
- Walt Holmer (1902–1976), American football quarterback and running back in the National Football League

== See also ==
- Holmer, Herefordshire, a village in England
  - Holmer and Shelwick, a civil parish formerly called "Holmer"
- Holmer Green, village in the parish of Little Missenden, Buckinghamshire, England

Media related to Holmer (surname) at Wikimedia Commons
