= Falefa Valley =

Valley on Upolu Island in Samoa

Coordinates: 13°55′42.39″S 171°35′45.82″W

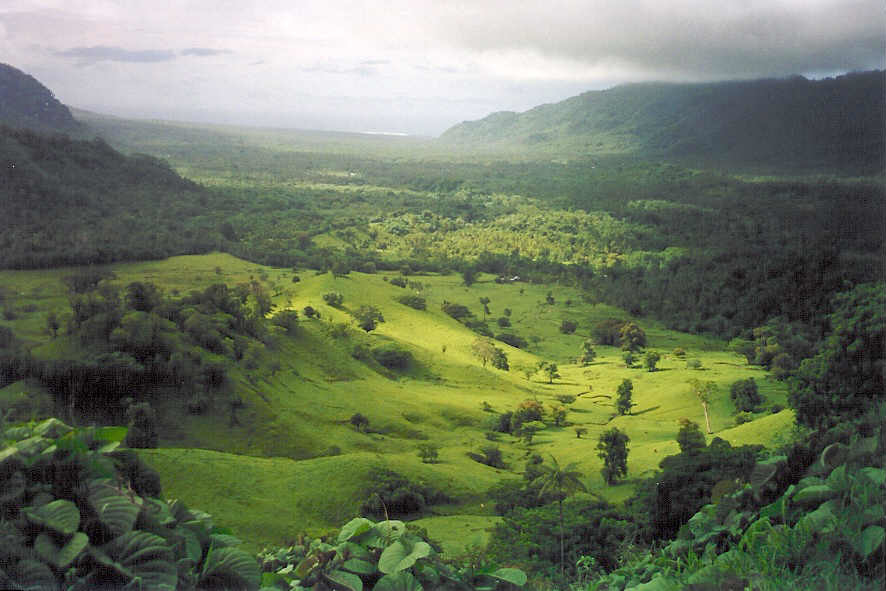
Falefa Valley looking north from Le Mafa Pass

Falefa Valley is situated inland on the east side of Upolu Island in Samoa. The valley forms part of the traditional domain of Falefa with the southern part at Le Mafa pass forming the natural boundary between Falefa and neighbouring Lotofaga. The area has been excavated and studied by archaeologists, in particular a New Zealand team led by Roger Curtis Green and Janet Davidson. Towards the north of the valley is Falefa village. The valley is situated in the political district of Atua. To the north east is the smaller district of Va'a-o-Fonoti which includes an extensive conservation area.

A main island highway runs north to south on the east side of the valley connecting the north coast of the island to the east and south coast settlements including the Aleipata Islands and Lotofaga.

== See also ==
- Archaeology in Samoa
