= Vailele =

Village in Samoa

- Village
- Location within Samoa
- Coordinates: 13°50′56″S 171°43′37″W
- Country: Samoa
- District: Tuamasaga

Population (2016)
  - Total: 2,869
- Time zone: +13

Vailele is a village situated on the central north coast of Upolu island in Samoa. It’s not to be confused with the far bigger Vaitele.

Vailele is in the electoral constituency (faipule district) of Vaimauga East in the larger political district of Tuamasaga.

The village is less than ten minutes east of the country's capital, Apia. The settlement is north facing and situated in Vailele Bay.

== Historical ==
In the 1800s, the large Vailele Plantation inland was owned by the German company Deutsche Handels und Plantagen Gesellschaft (DHPG) which employed workers from the Melanesian islands. DHPG was a major plantation owner in Samoa. It had formerly traded in the Pacific as Godeffroys but changed its name and expanded operations in Samoa when the family's parent company in Hamburg became bankrupt. Much of the village land lost during colonialism is now owned by the government operated Western Samoa Trust Estate Corporation (WSTEC). Financial difficulties by WSTEC in the late 1970s and early 1980s resulted in the sale of land in Vailele. However, the government returned some of the land to villagers in Vailele and neighbouring villages Lauli'i and Letogo.

== Archaeology ==
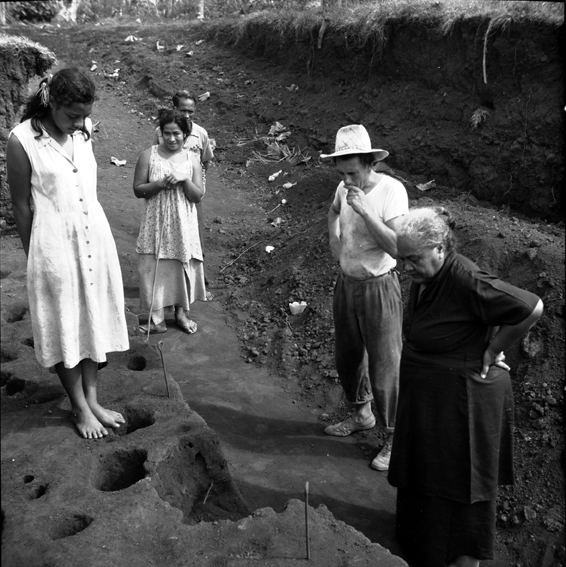
Vailele excavation in 1957 with Jack Golson and the family of I'iga Pisa visiting the site.

Archaeological field work in Samoa uncovered earth mounds at Vailele, including a large mound Laupule, associated with a figure called Tupuivao in oral history and another mound Tapuitea (evening star).

The studies of the mounds during the early 1940s were carried out by New Zealand anthropologist Derek Freeman (referred to as J.D. Freeman in literature) who was a schoolteacher in Samoa from April 1940 to November 1943. Freeman also excavated the Falemauga Caves in Upolu's interior. Plainware pottery sherds were found in 1957 by archaeologist Jack Golson.

== Notable people ==
- Mikaele Pesamino, a rugby union player in the Samoa Sevens team which represents Samoa internationally in rugby sevens.
- Simaika Mikaele, also a rugby union player in the Samoa Sevens team

== See also ==
- Archaeology in Samoa
- German Samoa
