= Heretic (play) =

Play by David Williamson

Heretix
- Original language: English
- Written by: David Williamson

Premiere
- Date: 1996

Heretic is a 1996 play by Australian playwright David Williamson.

The play explores cultural anthropologist Derek Freeman's reaction to Margaret Mead's famous book Coming of Age in Samoa. The play takes place in Freeman's dream, where individuals (including Mead) from his life return and discuss his life.

== Production ==
The play was directed by STC director Wayne Harrison in 1996, and starred Elizabeth Alexander as Mead and Robin Ramsay as Derek Freeman. However, after its opening night at Sydney Opera House, a row erupted between Williamson and Harrison about the director's interpretation of the play and almost overshadowed the play itself.

One controversial feature of the staging of the production was the use of huge, distorted, papier-mâché heads of powerful (and rejected by Freeman) female figures, such as Eleanor Roosevelt, Jacqueline Kennedy, and Marilyn Monroe.
