= Siutu =

Village in Savai'i, Samoa

Coordinates: 13°47′S 172°13′W

Siutu is a village on the island of Savai'i in Samoa. It is situated on the south coast of the island in the district of Palauli and the electoral district of Palauli 1. The population is 449.

Archaeology in Samoa uncovered pre-historic samples at a midden site in the village.
