= Donald Tuzin =

American social anthropologist (1945–2007)

- Born: June 14, 1945; Chicago, Illinois, U.S.
- Died: April 15, 2007 (aged 61); San Diego, California, U.S.
- Occupation: Social anthropologist

Donald F. Tuzin (June 14, 1945 – April 15, 2007) was an American social anthropologist best known for his ethnographic work on the Ilahita Arapesh, a horticultural people living in northeast lowland New Guinea, and for comparative studies of gender and sexuality within Melanesia. Tuzin was born in Chicago, Illinois, grew up in Winona, Minnesota, and spent his teen years again in Chicago. He received his B.A. from Western Reserve University in Ohio (shortly before its merger with Case Institute of Technology), where he became interested in anthropology and participated in the excavation of Native American archaeological sites left by the Mound Builders. He also received his master's degree from Case Western Reserve.

While studying at the University of London, Tuzin became interested in Sepik cultures and decided to go to the Australian National University's Research School of Pacific and Asian Studies (RSPAS), where he worked with the famous and controversial social anthropologist Derek Freeman. Tuzin conducted fieldwork among the Ilahita Arapesh in New Guinea's East Sepik Province. He completed his Ph.D. in anthropology at ANU in 1973 and joined the anthropology department at University of California, San Diego that same year.

Tuzin's most significant book was probably The Cassowary's Revenge (1997), a study of culture change and the construction and enactment of masculinity. The following summary is taken from the book jacket:

"Donald Tuzin first studied the New Guinea village of Ilahita in 1972. When he returned many years later, he arrived in the aftermath of a startling event: the village's men voluntarily destroyed their secret cult that had allowed them to dominate women for generations. The cult's collapse indicated nothing less than the death of masculinity, and Tuzin examines the labyrinth of motives behind this improbable, self-devastating act. The villagers' mythic tradition provided a basis for this revenge of Woman upon the dominion of Man, and, remarkably, Tuzin himself became a principal figure in its narratives. The return of the magic-bearing 'youngest brother' from America had been prophesied, and the villagers believed that Tuzin's return 'from the dead' signified a further need to destroy masculine traditions. The Cassowary's Revenge is an intimate account of how Ilahita's men and women think, emote, dream, and explain themselves. Tuzin also explores how the death of masculinity in a remote society raises disturbing implications for gender relations in our own society. In this light Tuzin's book is about men and women in search of how to value one another, and in today's world there is no theme more universal or timely."

In addition to teaching and mentoring students in anthropology, he co-founded (with Fitz Poole) and directed UCSD's Melanesian Archive, the world's largest depository of unpublished materials on the societies and cultures of Melanesia. In part because of Tuzin's work, UCSD was known during the 1970s and 1980s as one of the top institutions in the world for the anthropological study of Melanesia.

Professor Tuzin was also a professor for Eleanor Roosevelt College's, Making of the Modern World sequence. To augment his lectures, he wrote the book, Social Complexity in the Making: A Case Study Among the Arapesh of New Guinea.

Don Tuzin was twice chair of UCSD's department of anthropology, and in 2004-2005 was chair of UCSD's Academic Senate. In his later years, Tuzin was working on a biography of Derek Freeman in collaboration with Peter Hempenstall, a professor of history at the University of Canterbury, in New Zealand.

At the age of 61, he died of complications of pulmonary hypertension after a brief hospitalization.

== Select bibliography ==
=== Authored books ===
- Tuzin, Donald F. (1976) The Ilahita Arapesh: dimensions of unity, with a foreword by Margaret Mead. Berkeley: University of California Press.
- —— (1980) The Voice of the Tambaran: Truth and Illusion in Ilahita Arapesh Religion. Berkeley: University of California Press.
- —— (1997) The Cassowary's Revenge: The life and death of masculinity in a New Guinea society. Chicago: University of Chicago Press.
- —— (2001) Social Complexity in the Making: A case study among the Arapesh of New Guinea. London: Routledge.

=== Edited books ===
- Brown, Paula, and Donald F. Tuzin, eds. (1983) The Ethnography of Cannibalism. Society for Psychological Anthropology, Special Publication. Washington, D.C.: Society for Psychological Anthropology.
- Tuzin, Donald F., and Thomas Gregor, eds. (2001) Gender in Amazonia and Melanesia: An exploration of the comparative method. Berkeley: University of California Press. With.

=== Articles ===
- Tuzin, Donald F. (1984) "Miraculous Voices: The Auditory Experience of Numinous Objects." Current Anthropology 25(5):579-589, 593–596.
- —— (1991) "Sex, Culture, and the Anthropologist." Social Science and Medicine, 33(8):867-874.
- —— (1994) "The Forgotten Passion: Sexuality and Anthropology in the Ages of Victoria and Bronislaw." Journal of the History of the Behavioral Sciences 30(2):114-137.
- —— (1995) "Discourse, Intercourse, and the Excluded Middle: Anthropology and the Problem of Sexual Experience." In Paul R. Abramson and S.D. Pinkerton, eds., Sexual Nature/Sexual Culture. Chicago: University of Chicago Press, pp. 257–275.
- —— (2002) "Derek Freeman (1916–2001)". American Anthropologist 104, 1013–1015.

== Interlocutors ==
- Thomas Gregor
- Gilbert Herdt
- Fitz John Porter Poole
- Joel Robbins
