= Roger Green (archaeologist) =

American-born New Zealand archaeologist (1932–2009)

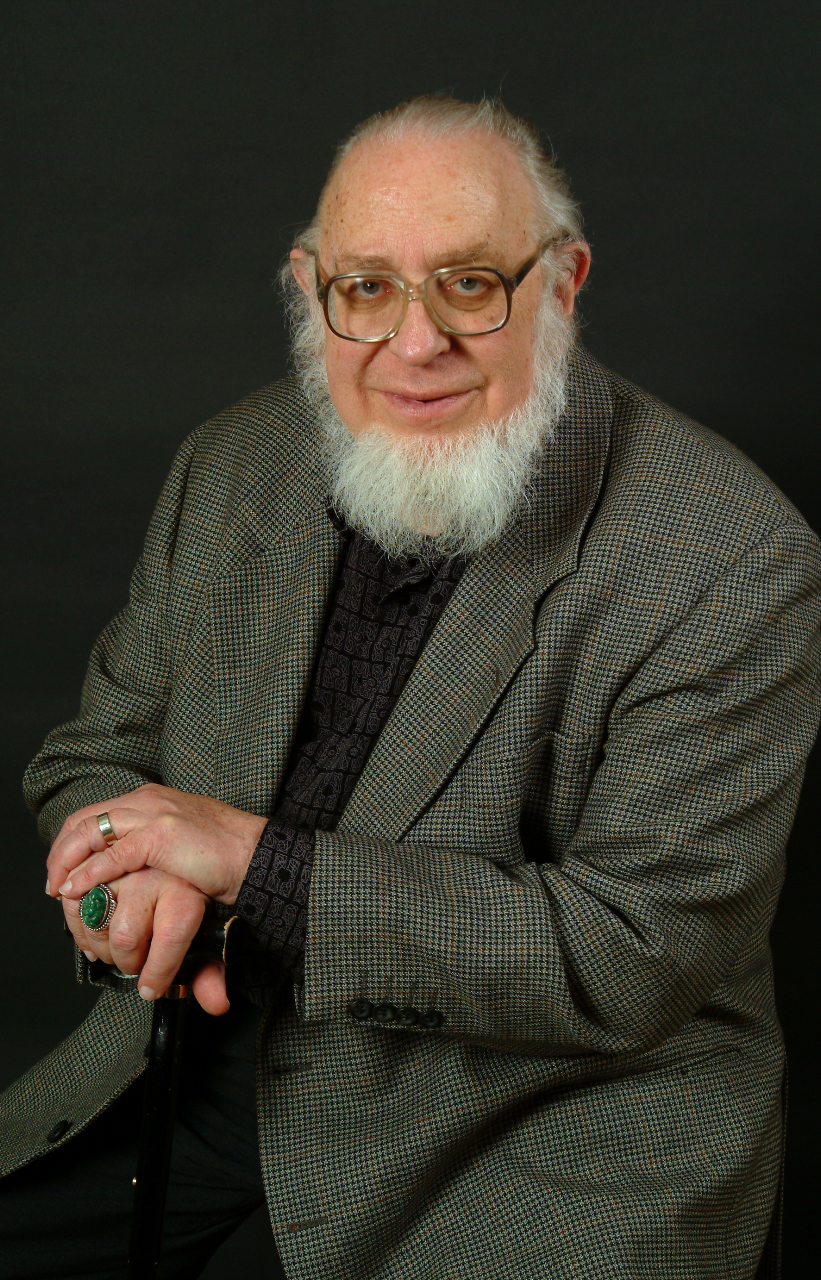
Roger Green in 2003

Roger Curtis Green ONZM (15 March 1932 – 4 October 2009) was an American-born, New Zealand–based archaeologist, professor emeritus at The University of Auckland, and member of the National Academy of Sciences and Royal Society of New Zealand. He was awarded the Hector and Marsden Medals and was an Officer of the New Zealand Order of Merit for his contributions to the study of Pacific culture history.

== Early life and education ==
Roger Green was born in Ridgewood, New Jersey, and expressed an interest in archaeology at an early age. At sixteen, his family relocated to Albuquerque, New Mexico, where his interest in North American prehistory flourished.

Following a field season on Pueblo sites in the region under the tutelage of Frank Hibben, Green attended the University of New Mexico. While there, he undertook coursework in geology and linguistics in addition to anthropology, while at the same time being engaged in officers training. He was particularly influenced by the work of linguist Edward Sapir during this period, which likely contributed to his subsequent works in Polynesian linguistics. During this period, Green continued to work on local field projects, resulting in his first published works.

His talents were recognised early on by his professors at New Mexico, and before completing his Masters study there, Green was encouraged to enroll in a doctorate program at Harvard. While there he studied closely under Gordon Willey and Cora Du Bois. It was also there that he was first introduced to Pacific prehistory by Douglas Oliver, who helped arrange a Fulbright fellowship that took him to New Zealand and on to conduct research in French Polynesia on the islands of Moorea and Mangareva. His Harvard PhD dissertation focused on the prehistoric sequence of the Auckland province.

== Academic career ==
Green had to delay submitting his dissertation due to becoming seriously ill with peritonitis in 1960, and the following year replaced Jack Golson as a senior lecturer of anthropology at University of Auckland. During this time lecturing in 1961, Green was able to submit his dissertation The Prehistoric Sequence of the Auckland Province, which was accepted. In 1966, he was promoted to associate professor, and worked for the next three years at the University of Hawaiʻi at Mānoa. From 1970 to 1973, he worked on an extensive research project with Douglas Yen in the Solomon Islands funded by a Captain James Cook Fellowship, after which he returned to Auckland for the remainder of his teaching career. He retired from teaching in 1992, at which time he was made professor emeritus.

In addition to teaching at Auckland and Hawaii, Green periodically held active teaching and research positions at the American Museum of Natural History in New York, the Bernice P. Bishop Museum in Honolulu, and Te Whare Wānanga o Awanuiārangi in Whakatāne, New Zealand. He also oversaw the funding of numerous research projects through the Green Foundation for Polynesian Research.

During his teaching career, Green taught a number of students who would later make significant contributions to New Zealand and Pacific archaeology, including Janet Davidson, Les Groube, Andrew Pawley, Lisa Matisoo-Smith.

== Contributions ==
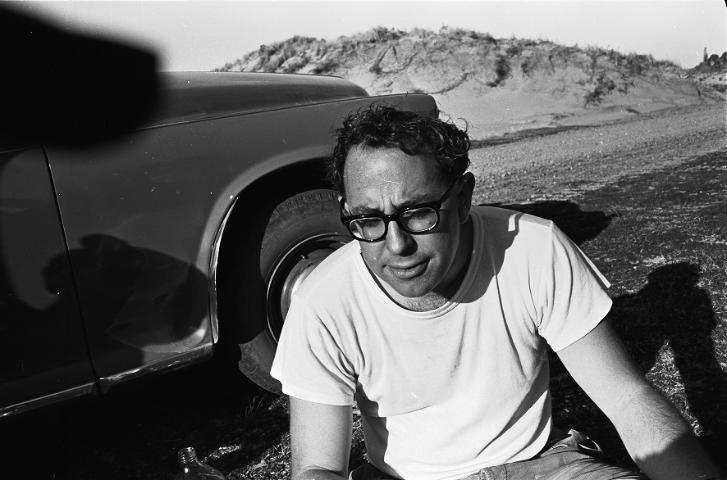
Green at Tairua Site, 1964

Green's earliest work was focused primarily on the Largo-Gallina phase of the Pueblo Native Americans. He conducted several excavations at various sites in New Mexico as part of academic and salvage projects.

In the Pacific, Green contributed to the individual culture histories of New Zealand, Hawaii, Samoa, Fiji, Tonga, Papua New Guinea, French Polynesia, the Solomon Islands, New Caledonia, and Easter Island. He worked extensively on the general prehistory of the Pacific, contributing to a myriad of topics including:

- Polynesian origins Green helped to develop a phylogenetic model of the Pacific using a combination of linguistic, ethnological, biological, and archaeological analysis; this work was complemented by ethnohistorical research of the ancestral Polynesian homeland, Hawaiki.
- Evolution of Polynesian languages From the 1960s, Green worked to classify Polynesian languages and identify common terms.
- The Lapita cultural complex Green was among the first to identify Lapita pottery and material culture with the Austronesian-speaking ancestors of the Polynesians. His excavations in the Reef and Santa Cruz Islands, as well as Watom Island in Papua New Guinea furnished significant data for this interpretation.
- Settlement patterns in Oceania Green pioneered the settlement pattern approach in the Pacific, which examined the archaeological landscape holistically rather than focus on sites with rich deposits. This was used to good effect by Green on Moorea, New Zealand, Samoa, and by others elsewhere.
- Radiocarbon and stratigraphic sequences Green worked closely with a number of archaeologists to develop the sequences for a number of island groups, and emphasised the importance of using archaeological context in addition to chronometric data.
- Long-distance voyaging and exchange Green's work with obsidian provenance and Lapita sites helped to develop ideas about prehistoric voyaging and exchange between island groups.

Among his methodological contributions, Green was well known for his work on obsidian dating and provenance, an invaluable tool in Pacific archaeology. Additionally, he made significant contributions to settlement pattern archaeology, particularly with his work in Moorea and Samoa.

The Green Foundation, established in 1984 by Green and his wife, Valerie, was an initiative which was started with diverted earnings from fee paying work Green was involved in. The Foundation supports multidisciplinary research in New Zealand and the Pacific.

== Selected publications ==
- Green, Roger C., 1956. A pit house of the Gallina phase. American Antiquity 22:10–16.
- Green, Roger C., 1961. Mo'orean archaeology. Man 61:169–173.
- Green, Roger C., 1962. Obsidian, its applications to archaeology. New Zealand Archaeological Association Newsletter 5:8–16.
- Green, Roger C., 1963a. A review of the prehistoric sequence in the Auckland Province. Auckland Archaeological Society Publication 1 and New Zealand Archaeological Association Monograph 2. Auckland: University Bindery Press.
- Green, Roger C., 1963b. Site preservation. New Zealand Archaeological Association Newsletter 6:57–69
- Green, Roger C., 1963c. A suggested revision of the Fijian sequence. Journal of the Polynesian Society 72:235–253.
- Green, Roger C., 1966. Linguistic subgrouping with Polynesia: the implications for prehistoric settlement. Journal of the Polynesian Society 80:355–370.
- Green, Roger C., 1967. The immediate origins of the Polynesians. In Polynesian Culture History: Essays in Honor of Kenneth P. Emory, edited by G. H. Highland et al. Bernice P. Bishop Museum Special Publication 56. Honolulu: Bishop Museum Press.
- Green, Roger C., K. Green, R. A. Rappaport, and J. M. Davidson. 1967. Archaeology on the island of Mo'orea, French Polynesia. Anthropological Papers of the American Museum of Natural History 51, 2. New York.
- Green, Roger C. and J. M. Davidson, eds. 1969. Archaeology in Western Samoa, Volume I. Auckland: Auckland Institute and Museum.
- Green, Roger C. and M. M. Kelly, eds. 1970. Studies in Oceanic Culture History, Volume I. Pacific Anthropological Records 11. Honolulu: Bishop Museum Press.
- Green, Roger C., 1972. Revision of the Tongan Sequence. Journal of the Polynesian Society 81:79–86
- Green, Roger C., 1973. Lapita pottery and the origins of Polynesian culture. Australian Natural History 17:332-37.
- Green, Roger C., 1977. A First Culture History of the Solomon Islands. Auckland: University of Auckland Bindery.
- Green, Roger C., 1979. Lapita. In The Prehistory of Polynesia, edited by J.D. Hennings. Cambridge, MA: Harvard University Press.
- Green, Roger C., 1980. Makaha before 1880 A.D. Makaha Valley Historical Project Summary Report No. 5. Pacific Anthropological Records 31. Honolulu: Bishop Museum Press.
- Green, Roger C. and J.S. Mitchell, 1983. New Caledonian culture history: a review of the archaeological sequence. New Zealand Journal of Archaeology 5:19–67.
- Kirch, Patrick V. and R. C. Green, 1987. History, phylogeny, and evolution in Polynesia. Current Anthropology 28: 431–443, 452–456.
- Kirch, Patrick V. and R. C. Green, 2001. Hawaiki, Ancestral Polynesia, An Essay in Historical Anthropology. Cambridge: Cambridge University Press.
- Green, Valerie J. and R. C. Green, 2007. An accent on atolls and approaches to population histories of Remote Oceania. In The Growth and Collapse of Pacific Island Societies: Archaeological and Demographic Perspectives, edited by P. V. Kirch and J.-L. Rallu. Honolulu: University of Hawaii Press.

== See also ==
- Lapita
- History of the Pacific Islands
- Archaeology in Samoa
- Polynesian languages
