= Simaika Mikaele =

- Born: 9 May 1978 (age 48) Samoa
- Height: 6 ft 5 in (1.96 m)
- Weight: 210 lb (95 kg)

Rugby union career
- Position: Flanker
International career
| Years | Team | Apps | (Points) |
| 2004 - Present | Samoa | 10 | (0) |
National sevens team
| Years | Team | | Comps |
- Samoa

Simaika Mikaele (born 9 May 1978) is a rugby union player in the Samoa Sevens team. He represented Samoa from 2001 to 2008.

Mikaele is from Vailele on the island of Upolu in Samoa.
