= Derek Freeman =

New Zealand anthropologist

John Derek Freeman
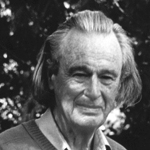
- Derek Freeman
- Born: 15 August 1916; Wellington, New Zealand
- Died: 6 July 2001 (aged 84); Canberra, Australia
- Occupation: Anthropologist
- Spouse: Monica Maitland

John Derek Freeman (15 August 1916 – 6 July 2001) was a New Zealand anthropologist known for his criticism of Margaret Mead's work on Samoan society, as described in her 1928 ethnography Coming of Age in Samoa. His attack "ignited controversy of a scale, visibility, and ferocity never before seen in anthropology."

Freeman initially became interested in Boasian cultural anthropology while an undergraduate in Wellington, and later went to live and work as a teacher in Samoa. After entering the New Zealand Naval Reserve in World War II, he did graduate training with British social anthropologists Meyer Fortes and Raymond Firth at London School of Economics. He did two and a half years of fieldwork in Borneo studying the Iban people. His 1953 doctoral dissertation described the relations between Iban agriculture and kinship practices. Returning to Borneo in 1961 he suffered a nervous breakdown induced by an intense rivalry with ethnologist and explorer Tom Harrisson. This experience profoundly altered his view of anthropology, changing his interests to looking at the ways in which human behavior is influenced by universal psychological and biological foundations. From then on Freeman argued strongly for a new approach to anthropology which integrated insights from evolutionary theory and psychoanalysis, and he published works on the concepts of aggression and choice.

This new interest in biological and psychological universals led him to take issue with the famous American anthropologist Margaret Mead who had described Samoan adolescents as not suffering from the "coming of age" crisis which was commonly thought to be universal when the study was published in 1923. Mead argued that the lack of this crisis in Samoan adolescence was caused by the youths' greater degree of sexual freedom, and that adolescence crises were therefore not universal, but culturally conditioned. In 1966-67 Freeman conducted fieldwork in Samoa, trying to find Mead's original informants, and while visiting the community where Mead had worked he experienced another breakdown. In 1983 Freeman published his book Margaret Mead and Samoa: The Making and Unmaking of an Anthropological Myth in which he argued that Mead's data and conclusions were wrong and that Samoan youths suffered from the same problems as Western adolescents. He also argued that Samoan culture in fact put greater emphasis on female virginity than Western culture and had higher indices of juvenile delinquency, sexual violence and suicide. He later published The Fateful Hoaxing of Margaret Mead, in which he argued that Mead's misunderstandings of Samoan culture were due to her having been hoaxed by two of her female Samoan informants, who had merely joked about sexual escapades that they did not in fact have.

Freeman's critique of Mead sparked intense debate and controversy in the discipline of anthropology, as well as in the general public. Many of Freeman's critics argued that he misrepresented Mead's views and ignored changes in Samoan society that had taken place in the period between Mead's work in 1925-1926 and his own from 1941 to 1943, including an increasing influence of Christianity. Several Samoan scholars who had been discontented with Mead's depiction of them as happy and sexually liberated thought that Freeman erred in the opposite direction. But Freeman's arguments were embraced enthusiastically among scholars who argue for the existence of genetically hardwired universal behaviors and prefer such fields as sociobiology and evolutionary psychology. The debate made Freeman a celebrity both inside and outside of anthropology, to an extent that in 1996 Freeman's life became the topic of the play Heretic written by Australian playwright David Williamson, which opened in the Sydney Opera House. The so-called Mead-Freeman controversy spanned three decades, and Freeman published his last rebuttal of a critique of his arguments only weeks before his death in 2001.

== Life ==
Freeman was raised in Wellington by an Australian father and a New Zealand mother who had been reared in Presbyterian tradition. In particular, Freeman's mother took an active interest in his education and he maintained a close relationship with her during his adult life.

=== Early studies ===
In 1934 he entered Wellington's Victoria University College as an undergraduate and studied psychology and philosophy with Siegfried Frederick Nadel. Freeman later commented that if anthropology had been offered he would likely have chosen to study that. He also studied education and was issued a teacher's certificate in 1937. In 1938 he attended a graduate seminar taught by Ernest Beaglehole, who in turn had been a student of Edward Sapir. Beaglehole encouraged Freeman's interest in Mead's groundbreaking 1928 work, and this sparked his interest in visiting Samoa.

During his undergraduate studies in psychology he studied the socialization of children aged 6 to 9 in Wellington. This research led him to take a strong cultural determinist stance, even publishing an article in the student publication "Salient" stating that "the aims and desire which determine behavior are all constituted by the social environment". Also during this period he met Jiddu Krishnamurti who instilled in Freeman an interest in free will and choice as a counterpoint to the forces of social and cultural conditioning.

=== In Samoa ===
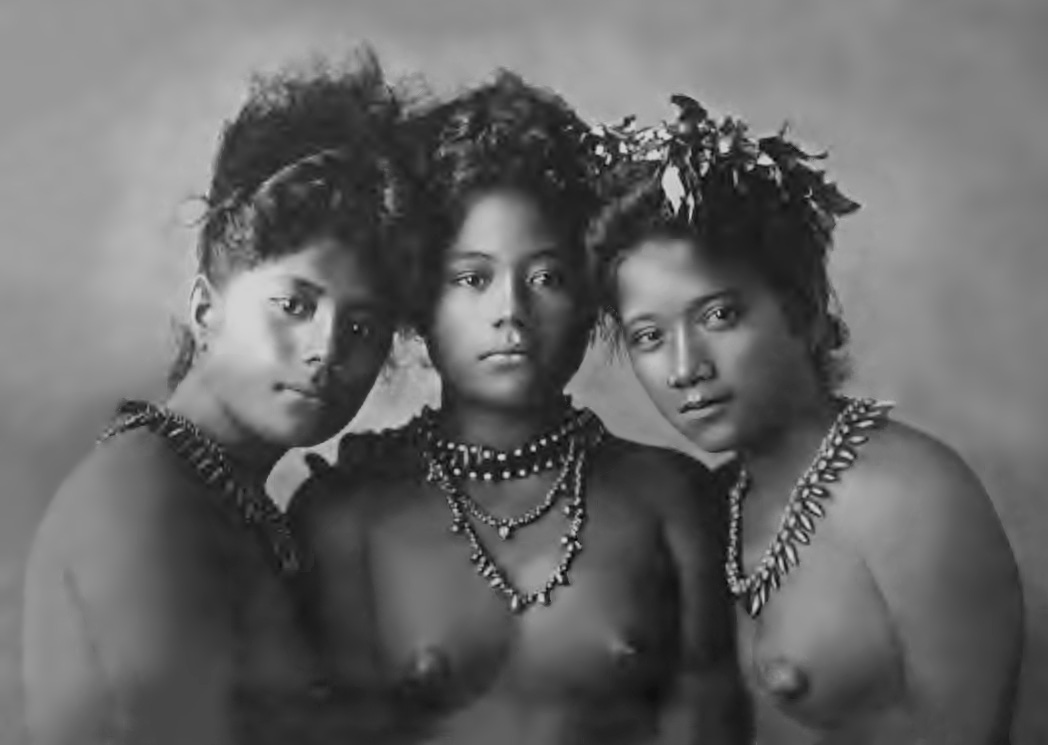
Three Samoan girls photographed in 1902 forty years before Freeman's arrival in Samoa

In 1940 Freeman's desire to travel Samoa was realized when he took a position as a schoolteacher in Samoa, from April 1940 to November 1943, during which time he learned to speak the Samoan language fluently, being qualified by a government examination. And he was adopted into a Samoan family of the community of Sa'anapu, and received the chiefly title of Logona-i-Taga. He also made archaeological field studies around the island of Upolu including the Falemauga Caves and earth mounds in Vailele village. Even though he was working as a teacher, he also had time to undertake studies of socialization in children of the same age group with which he had worked in New Zealand. Freeman also collected Samoan artefacts of material culture, which was later deposited in the Otago Museum of Dunedin, New Zealand, of which he was made an honorary curator of ethnology. Having served in the Samoan defence force since 1941, in 1943, Freeman left Samoa to enlist in the Royal New Zealand Naval Volunteer Reserve. He served in Europe and the far east during the war, and in September and October 1945 while his ship was accepting the surrender of Japanese troops in Borneo, Freeman came into contact with the Iban people. This experience inspired him to return to do fieldwork in Sarawak.

=== Doctoral studies: library research on Samoa, field research in Borneo ===
In 1946 he received a Rehabilitation Bursary of the New Zealand government, he did two years of post-graduate studies with Raymond Firth at the London School of Economics and Political Science. During 1946-48 his research centered on manuscript sources relating to Samoa in the archives of the London Missionary Society. In 1947 he gave a lecture series at Oxford University on Samoan social structure, this brought him into contact with Meyer Fortes who became a significant influence on his doctoral research. In November 1948, he married Monica Maitland, and shortly after the couple left for Sarawak where Freeman would spend the next 30 months doing fieldwork among the Iban for his doctoral dissertation. In Borneo, Freeman collaborated closely with his wife, an artist, who made many ethnographic drawings of the Iban. Freeman returned to England in 1951 and was accepted into King's College at the University of Cambridge, where he completed his doctoral thesis on the Iban in 1953.

His thesis about Iban agriculture has been described as "a superb piece of research" and "one of the best and most complete accounts of swidden agriculture that has yet been made" It was pioneering in using quantitative data to illuminate aspects of swidden economy as well as social organization. He also described the Iban kinship system which was remarkable in being neither patrilineal or matrilineal, but allowing either kind of filiation (but not both) for any individual. Freeman described this system as "utrolineal", and personal choice inherent in the system underpinned much of Freeman's later work.

He subsequently taught at the University of Otago in New Zealand, and the University of Samoa. In 1955, he was offered and accepted the appointment of Senior Fellow in the Research School of Pacific (and Asian) Studies at the Australian National University in Canberra, where he stayed until his death.

=== Kinship studies and changing heart ===
In the next decades Freeman worked on kinship, exploring especially the system of cognatic descent, in several important papers, such as Freeman (1957) and (1961). Up until this point Freeman had been trained in a framework of British social anthropology and identified strongly with American, Boasian cultural anthropology, but from 1960 he grew increasingly dissatisfied with that paradigm, partly because he felt that it left him unable to answer several important questions regarding Iban ritual behavior. Freeman later described how this dissatisfaction culminated when he read a passage in Victor Turner's "Symbols in Ndembu ritual", which questioned the ability of anthropologists to form adequate opinions about psychological aspects of ritual behavior.

=== Conversion and breakdown in Kuching ===
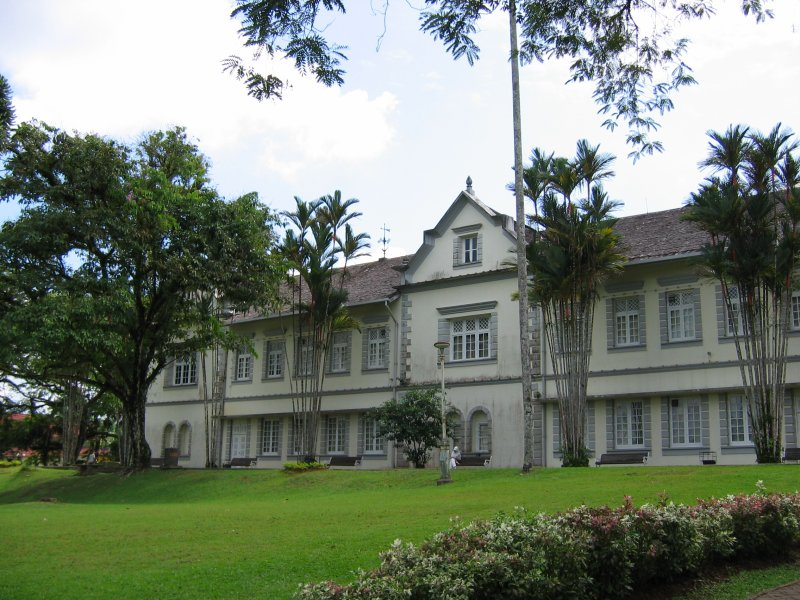
The Old Sarawak Museum in Kuching, where Freeman destroyed an Iban carved statue.

An important event in Freeman's life and career took place in 1961 when Freeman was sent to Borneo to attend to a graduate student, one Brian de Martinoir, who had run into trouble with locals while studying in central Borneo. The student (who was later described by Freeman as an impostor with fake credentials) had been subject to verbal abuse and humiliation by Tom Harrisson, Government Ethnologist and Curator of the Sarawak Museum, and this event had threatened his relationship with the Kajang people that he was studying. Freeman knew Harrisson, from his earlier work in Borneo in 1957 when Freeman had himself once been subject to Harrisson's fiery temper - the two men both had strong personalities and they were both strongly territorial about their research subjects.

During the stay in Kuching, Freeman developed an intense antagonism towards Harrisson, whom he believed to be a corrupting influence on the local indigenous people, and in spite of his orders from the Australian National University to leave Harrisson be, he worked intensely to put him in a bad light with the local government, and to have him forcibly removed from Borneo. Freeman seems to have believed that through erotic statues elaborated by the local Iban and working in concert with agents of the Soviet Union to subvert the British rule of Malaysia, Harrisson was exerting a form of mind control over Freeman himself as well as over the officials of Borneo. The conflict culminated when Freeman broke into Harrisson's house while he was out, and smashed a carved wooden sculpture at the Sarawak museum. Doubting his own mental health Freeman left Borneo for England intent to see a friend who was a psychiatrist, but during a stop-over in Karachi where he met with officials from London, he decided instead to return to Canberra. In Canberra, Freeman was talked into seeing a psychiatrist by the university, agreeing on the condition that the topic of conversation would be Harrisson's madness and not his own mental state. When the psychiatrist Dr. Tenthowathan evaluated him as being emotionally unstable, Freeman was deeply offended and wrote a report denouncing the doctor as an incompetent. While there were always speculations and divided opinions about Freeman's mental health among his friends and colleagues, Freeman himself rejected such speculations entirely, stating that he was in full control of himself throughout the events in Kuching.

Freeman himself described the events in Kuching as a "conversion" and an "abreaction" through which he acquired a new level of awareness, including the sudden realization that most of the basic assumptions of cultural anthropology were inadequate. From then on he adopted a new, less culturalistic and more naturalistic scientific stance, incorporating elements of ethology, primatology, neuroscience, psychology and evolutionary theory. He also changed the name under which he published; until that point he had published as J. D. Freeman, but from then on he published as Derek Freeman.

=== Freeman and Mead in Canberra ===
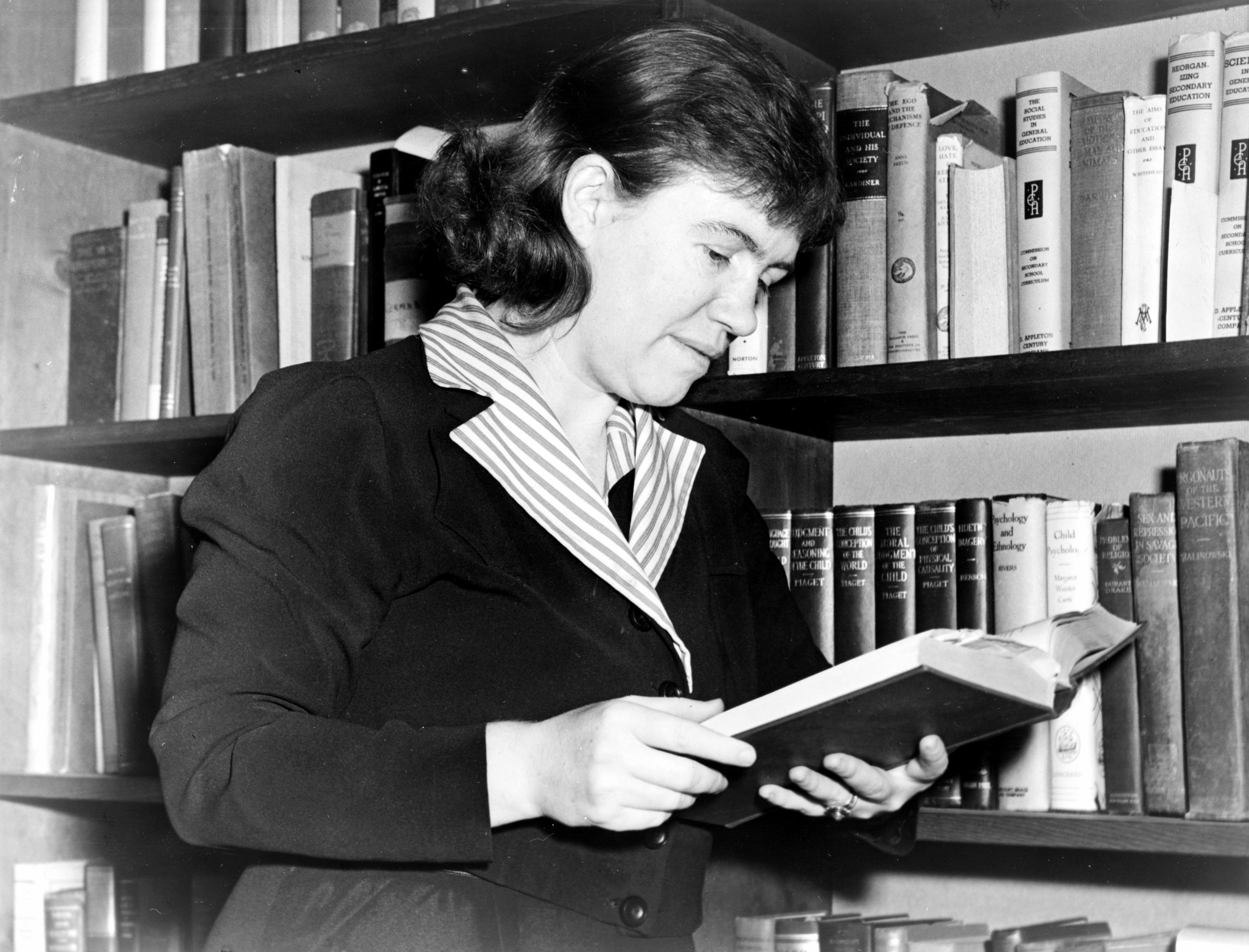
Margaret Mead, whose conclusions regarding female sexuality in Samoa Freeman sought to refute.

The events also affected Freeman's career by making the Malaysian government declare him persona non grata in Borneo, the place which had been his primary research site. Freeman then traveled to Europe to study psychoanalysis for two years. He contacted Margaret Mead, asking her to introduce him to the American psychoanalytic milieu, which she reluctantly did. Mead knew at that point that Freeman had privately criticised her work in Samoa, and also had heard of his reputation for being difficult to deal with. In November 1964 Mead visited the Australian National University and she and Freeman had their only meeting. Freeman privately presented Mead with most of the critique of her work that he would later publish after her death, and at a public meeting they had a heated discussion about the importance of female virginity in Samoan culture. During this meeting Freeman made a peculiar faux pas. When Mead asked why he had not brought his undergraduate thesis on Samoan social structure to her residence the night before, he replied "because I was afraid you might ask me to stay the night". Mead was by then more than 60 years old and walked with a cane, and the suggestion that Freeman thought Mead might seduce him caused hilarity in the auditorium. Freeman later commented that he had no idea why he said what he did, and that he was himself mortified at hearing his own words. This slip and subsequent events in Samoa, have been used to argue that Freeman's academic relationship with Margaret Mead was complicated by Freeman's emotions. Freeman later admitted that he did feel intimidated by Mead even as he was administering his harsh verbal critique of her work, and he described her as a "castrator of men" to whose power he did not want to succumb.

=== Back to Samoa ===
In December 1965, Freeman returned to Samoa, staying there the next two years. Originally his research was supposed to focus on social change, especially interactions between demographic and environmental processes, and he intended to base his research in ethological and psychoanalytic theory. However, traveling to Samoa Freeman decided that his objective should rather be to refute Mead's studies of Samoan sexuality. After working for a while in Western Samoa where he had most of his connections, he traveled to Ta‘ū in American Samoa, the location of Mead's fieldwork in the 1920s, hoping to find some of her original informants. He did not find any, but he did interview several Chiefs who had known Mead and who were highly critical of her depictions of Samoan society. He was also told that Mead had had an affair with a Samoan man, and the men he interviewed expressed outrage at her sexual licentiousness. This information deeply affected Freeman, who later described the discovery as deeply upsetting. He concluded that when Mead described Young Samoan women as sexually liberated she was in fact projecting onto them "her own sexual experiences as a young woman in the faraway, romantic south seas". Shortly after uncovering this information Freeman suffered another breakdown, his Samoan hosts found him wandering the beach in an agitated state. Due to his "verbally violent" behavior, the coast guard was dispatched to bring him to observation at the local hospital. Samoan witnesses ascribed the incident to spirit possession, some Americans thought of it as evidence of psychological problems, but Freeman himself dismissed those speculations attributing it to fatigue from research and possible symptoms of dengue fever.

=== The beginnings of controversy ===
Back from Samoa in 1968 Freeman gave a paper criticizing Mead to the Australian Association of Social Anthropology. The paper contained many of the arguments later to be published in "Margaret Mead and Samoa": Freeman argued that Mead had been influenced by her strongly held belief in the power of culture as a determinant of human behavior, and that this belief had caused her to mischaracterize Samoa as a sexually liberated society when in fact it was characterized by sexual repression and violence and adolescent delinquency. In 1972 he published a note in the Journal of the Polynesian Society criticizing Mead's spelling of Polynesian words suggesting that her non-standard orthography betrayed a general lack of skills in the Samoan language. Completing his manuscript of Margaret Mead and Samoa in 1977 he wrote Mead offering her to read it before publication, but Mead was by then seriously ill with cancer and was unable to respond - she died the next year. Freeman sent the manuscript first to the University of Oxford Press for publication, but the editor requested several revisions which Freeman rejected. In 1982 the manuscript was accepted for publication by the Australian National University Press, which issued the work in 1983.

In 1979 Freeman also sparked a public controversy in Canberra when he protested against the Mexican government's gift of a copy of the Aztec calendar stone to the Australian National University. Freeman believed the stone to have been an altar used for human sacrifice, and therefore saw it as being inappropriate. Freeman stated that the Aztecs were "the most barbaric culture in all of human history". The event caused public debate, with commentators accusing Freeman of exhibiting a double standard as he did not speak out against a model of the Roman Colosseum in the Classics Museum at the Australian National University, and that he had never spoken similarly out against practices of human sacrifice and cannibalism amongst the Bornean and Samoan people he had studied. The controversy created an urban legend in Australia that Freeman had either doused the stone with blood in a display of protest, or that he had planned to do so - these stories are however incorrect, and Freeman in fact calmly attended the inauguration of the stone.

=== Freeman vs. Mead: A self described heresy ===
Freeman's research on Samoa was conducted over four decades, and crystallized in 1981 when he was finally granted access to the archives of the High Court of American Samoa for the period of the 1920s; consequently, his refutation was published only after Mead's death in 1978. Freeman says that he informed Mead of his continuing work in refuting her research when he met her in person in November 1964 and engaged in correspondence with her; nevertheless, he has come under fire for not publishing his work at a time when Mead could reply to his accusations. However, when Freeman died in 2001, his obituary in The New York Times pointed out that Freeman tried to publish his criticism of Mead as early as 1971, but American publishers had rejected his manuscript. In 1978, Freeman sent a revised manuscript to Mead, but she was ill and died a few months later without responding.

The publication of Margaret Mead in Samoa: the Making and Unmaking of an Anthropological Myth sparked an intense controversy both within anthropology and in the general public. The debate which has been characterized as being "of a scale, visibility, and ferocity never before seen in anthropology," lasted for more than a quarter of a century and has not yet died out. Dozens of articles and many monograph books have been published analyzing the arguments and the debate itself.

In the 1983 book Freeman described incongruities between Mead's published research and his observations of Samoans:

In my early work I had, in my unquestioning acceptance of Mead's writings, tended to dismiss all evidence that ran counter to her findings. By the end of 1942, however, it had become apparent to me that much of what she had written about the inhabitants of Manu'a in eastern Samoa did not apply to the people of western Samoa...Many educated Samoans, especially those who had attended college in New Zealand, had become familiar with Mead's writings about their culture...[and] entreated me, as an anthropologist, to correct her mistaken depiction of the Samoan ethos.

Freeman's 1983 critique asserts that Mead was tricked by native informants who were lying to her and that these misconceptions reinforced Mead's doctrine of "absolute cultural determinism" that entirely neglects the role of biology and evolution in human behavior, concentrating instead on the cultural influences. Freeman also argues that "Mead ignored violence in Samoan life, did not have a sufficient background in—or give enough emphasis to—the influence of biology on behavior, did not spend enough time in Samoa, and was not familiar enough with the Samoan language."

Freeman's refutation was initially met by some with accusations of "circumstantial evidence, selective quotation, omission of inconvenient evidence, spurious historical tracking and other critical observations," resulting in "major questions" about the validity and honesty of his scholarship. In 1996 Martin Orans examined Mead's notes preserved at the Library of Congress, and credits her for leaving all of her recorded data available to the general public. Orans concludes that Freeman's basic criticisms, that Mead was duped by ceremonial virgin Fa'apua'a Fa'amu (who later swore to Freeman that she had played a joke on Mead) was wrong for several reasons: first, Mead was well aware of the forms and frequency of Samoan joking; second, she provided a careful account of the sexual restrictions on ceremonial virgins that corresponds to Fa'apua'a Fa'auma'a's account to Freeman, and third, that Mead's notes make clear that she had reached her conclusions about Samoan sexuality before meeting Fa'aupa'a Fa'amu. He therefore concludes, contrary to Freeman, that Mead was never the victim of a hoax. Orans argues that Mead's data supports several different conclusions (Orans argues that Mead's own data portrays Samoa as more sexually restrictive than the popular image), and that Mead's conclusions hinge on an interpretive, rather than positivist, approach to culture.

Freeman's obituary in The New York Times stated that "His challenge was initially greeted with disbelief or anger, but gradually won wide -- although not complete -- acceptance," but further said that "many anthropologists have agreed to disagree over the findings of one of the science's founding mothers, acknowledging both Mead's pioneering research and the fact that she may have been mistaken on details."

Soon after, The New York Times published the following response from Professor Louise Lamphere, president of the American Anthropological Association,

Your 5 Aug. obituary of the anthropologist Derek Freeman leaves the impression that the two books he wrote attacking Margaret Mead's work have permanently damaged her reputation. The Freeman debate has been the subject of a number of books and scholarly articles that support her views on the importance of culture for the adolescent experience, while criticizing some details of her research.

I have taught about the controversy for the last 18 years and am still impressed by the fact that a 24-year-old woman could produce a study so far ahead of its time. Dr. Freeman studied a different island 20 years after Mead's research, and his notion that biology is more determinative than culture is oversimplified. Most serious scholarship casts grave doubt on his data and theory.

A detailed review of the controversy by Paul Shankman, published by the University of Wisconsin Press in 2009, supports the contention that Mead's research was essentially correct, and concludes that Freeman cherry-picked his data and misrepresented both Mead and Samoan culture.

=== Death ===
Freeman died of congestive heart failure in 2001 at the age of eighty-four. His private book collection, which has been described as one of a number of "major Canberra personal libraries", was dispersed after his death.

== Selected works ==
=== Books and theses ===
- 1953 Family and Kin among the Iban of Sarawak. University of Cambridge.
- 1955 Iban agriculture; a report on the shifting cultivation of hill rice by the Iban of Sarawak, Colonial Office Research Study No. 19 (London: Her Majesty's Stationery Office)
- 1970. Report on the Iban. LSE Monographs in Social Anthropology No. 41. London: Athlone Press (first published in 1955)
- 1983. Margaret Mead and Samoa: The making and unmaking of an anthropological myth. Cambridge: Harvard University Press. ISBN 0-14-022555-2
- 1998. The fateful hoaxing of Margaret Mead: A historical analysis of her Samoan research. Boulder: Westview Press.ISBN 0-8133-3693-7

=== Articles and chapters ===
- 1957. Iban pottery. Sarawak Museum Journal 8
- 1957 The family system of the Iban of Borneo. In Jack Goody (ed.) The developmental cycle in domestic groups (Cambridge Papers in Social Anthropology, No. 1), pp. 15–52. Cambridge: Cambridge University Press.
- 1960 The Iban of Western Borneo. In G.P. Murdock (ed.) Social structure in Southeast Asia, pp. 65–87. Chicago: Quadrangle Books.
- 1961. [review of] Social Stratification in Polynesia. by Marshall D. Sahlins, Man, Vol. 61, (Aug. 1961), pp. 146–148
- 1961. On the Concept of the Kindred. The Journal of the Royal Anthropological Institute of Great Britain and Ireland Vol. 91, No. 2, 1961. pp. 192–220
- 1964. Some Observations on Kinship and Political Authority in Samoa. American Anthropologist, 66: 553–568
- 1965. Samoa: A Matter of Emphasis. American Anthropologist, 67: 1534–1537.
- 1966. Social anthropology and the scientific study of human behaviour. Man. New Series, Vol. 1, No. 3 (Sep. 1966), pp. 330–342
- 1968. Thunder, Blood, and the Nicknaming of God's Creatures. Psychoanalytic Quarterly, 37:353-399
- 1969. The Sea Dayaks of Borneo before White Rajah Rule. The Journal of Asian Studies
- 1970. Human nature and culture. In Man and the New Biology. Australian National University Press, Canberra
- 1971. Aggression: instinct or symptom? Australian and New Zealand Journal of Psychiatry. Jun;5(2):66-77.
- 1973. Darwinian Psychological Anthropology: A Biosocial Approach [with Comments and Reply] Current Anthropology Vol. 14, No. 4, pp. 373–387
- 1974. The Evolutionary Theories of Charles Darwin and Herbert Spencer [with Comments and Replies] Current Anthropology. Vol. 15, No. 3 (Sep. 1974), pp. 211–237
- 1977. Studies in Borneo Societies: Social Process and Anthropological Explanation. Man.
- 1980. Sociobiology: The 'antidiscipline' of anthropology. In Montagu, A. (ed.), Sociobiology Examined. Oxford University Press, New York.
- 1981 Some reflections on the nature of Iban society. Canberra: Department of Anthropology, Research School of Pacific (and Asian) Studies, The Australian National University.
- 1981. The anthropology of choice: An ANZAAS presidential address given in Auckland, New Zealand, on 24 January 1979. Canberra Anthropology 4(1): 82–100.
- 1983. Inductivism and the test of truth: A rejoinder to Lowell D. Holmes and others. Canberra Anthropology 6(2): 96–192. Special Volume: Fact and Context in Ethnography: The Samoa Controversy
- 1984. "O Rose thou art sick!" A Rejoinder to Weiner, Schwartz, Holmes, Shore, and Silverman. American Anthropologist, 86: 400–40
- 1984. Response [to Ala'ilima, Wendt and McDowell]. Pacific Studies 7(2): 140–196.
- 1985. A reply to Ember's reflections on the Freeman-Mead controversy. American Anthropologist 87(4): 910–917.
- 1985. Response to Reyman and Hammond. American Anthropologist 87(2): 394–395.
- 1986. Rejoinder to Patience and Smith. American Anthropologist 88(1): 162-167
- 1987. Comment on Holmes's "Quest for the real Samoa". American Anthropologist 89(4): 930–935.
- 1987. Review of Quest for the real Samoa: The Mead/Freeman controversy and beyond, by Lowell D. Holmes. Journal of the Polynesian Society 96(3): 392–395.
- 1989. Fa’apua’a and Margaret Mead. American Anthropologist 91:1017–22.
- 1989. Holmes, Mead and Samoa. American Anthropologist 91(3): 758–762.
- 1991. There's tricks i' th' world: An historical analysis of the Samoan researches of Margaret Mead. Visual Anthropology Review 7(1): 103–128.
- 1991. On Franz Boas and the Samoan researches of Margaret Mead. Current Anthropology 32(3): 322–330.
- 1992. Paradigms in collision: The far-reaching controversy over the Samoan researches of Margaret Mead and its significance for the human sciences. Academic Questions Summer: 23–33.
- 1996. Derek Freeman: Reflections of a heretic. The Evolutionist (an internet-only magazine), London School of Economics,
- 1997. Paradigms in collision: Margaret Mead's mistake and what it has done to anthropology. Skeptic 5: 66–73.
- 2001. "Words have no words for words that are not true": A rejoinder to Serge Tcherkézoff. Journal of the Polynesian Society, 110(3):301-11
- 2001. Paradigms in collision, in Dilthey's dream. Canberra, Australia: Pandanus

== See also ==
- Archaeology in Samoa
- Heretic (play)

== Cited works ==
- Margaret Mead and Samoa: The Making and Unmaking of an Anthropological Myth by Derek Freeman, Harvard University Press, 1983, ISBN 0-14-022555-2.
- McCall, Grant (April 2001). "The Fateful Hoaxing of Margaret Mead: A Historical Analysis of her Samoan Research book review". Australian Journal of Anthropology. 12 (1). Archived from the original on 24 June 2006 – via FindArticles.
- "Culture, Biology, and Evolution: The Mead–Freeman Controversy Revisited" by Paul Shankman, Journal of Youth and Adolescence, Springer Netherlands, Volume 29, Number 5 / October 2000, ISSN 0047-2891: Pages 539–556.
- "Derek Freeman: 1916-2001" by Donald Tuzin, American Anthropologist, September 2002, Vol. 104, No. 3, pp. 1013–1015.
- "Margaret Mead: Human Nature and the Power of Culture", Library of Congress, 15 February 2006.
