= Falemauga Caves =

Caves of Upolu, Samoa

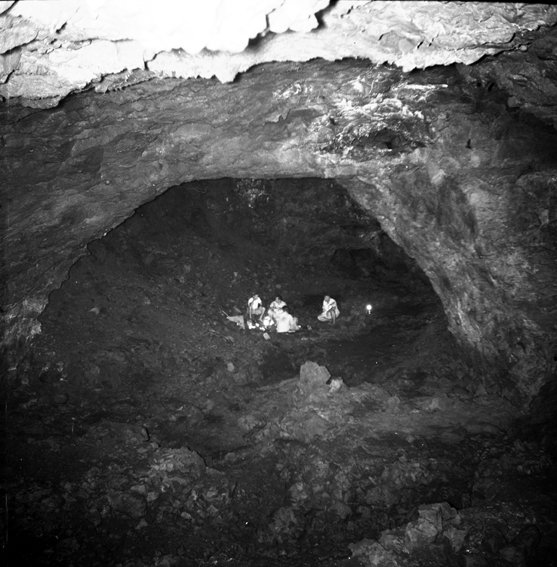
- Falemauga Caves - large chamber (1957 photo)

- location in Samoa
- 13°54′58″S 171°49′20″W
- Location: central ridge of Upolu island
- Region: Tuamasaga district, Samoa

Site notes
- Excavation dates: 1940s
- Archaeologists: Derek Freeman

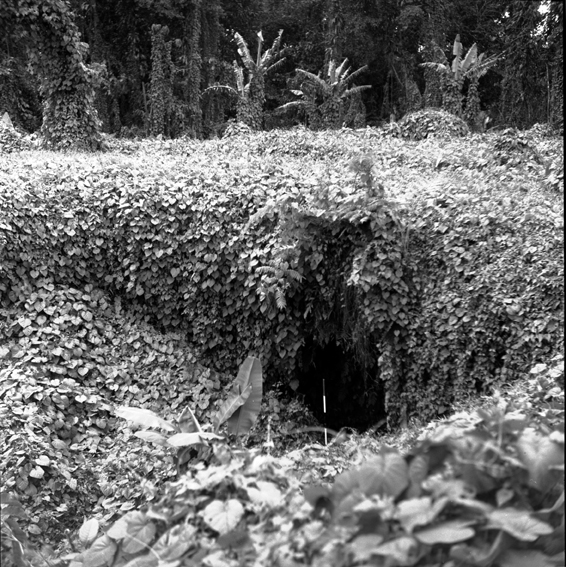
Entrance to main shaft (1957 photo)

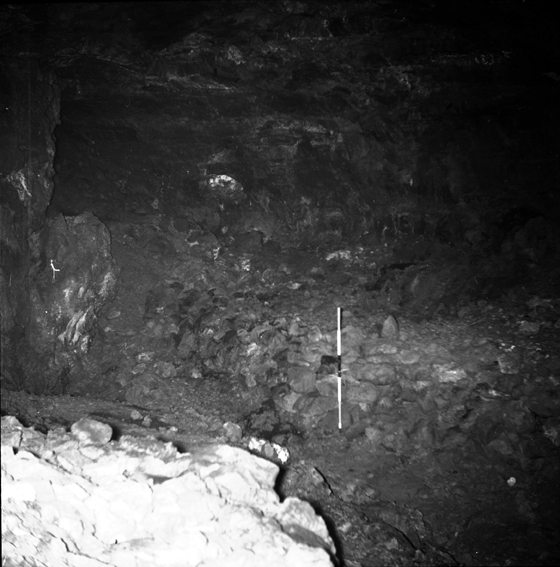
Heaped scoria in the main gallery (1957 photo)

The Falemauga Caves are large natural caverns in a series of lava-tunnels situated in the Tuamasaga district along the central ridge of Upolu island in Samoa. The caves have been studied by archaeologists in Samoa with evidence of human occupation in pre-history. They were also used as a place of refuge by the people of Tuamasaga.

The caves were explored and excavated in the early 1940s by New Zealand anthropologist Derek Freeman who published his report in the Journal of the Polynesian Society in 1944. Platforms constructed of stacked rocks, charcoal, stone adzes and marine shells were found in the caves.

In the Samoan language, the name Falemauga can be broken down into two words, fale which means 'house' and mauga which means 'mountain.'

== Location ==
The Falemauga Caves are located in an inland area called Falemauga, about 6 miles (9.7 km) south west from Apia, Samoa's capital. Entrance to the main system of tunnels is about five and a half miles (8.9 km) south (inland) of the coastal village of Malie.

== History ==
When Freeman studied the caves in 1941, they were all located on a plantation owned by a 'Mr. S. V. Mackenzie of Apia.' During his field work, Freeman stayed in Mackenzie's house in Falemauga, located about 900 feet (270 m) from the caves. Prior to Mackenzie, the land had formerly been owned by a German, Herr Paul Ludwig Schroeder, whose son Mr. H. H. Schroeder, discovered the caves in 1914. The caves were visited in August 1914 by members of the New Zealand Expeditionary Force, which was occupying the country at the time. In 1920, they were visited by Dr. J. Allan Thomson, Director of the Dominion Museum in New Zealand. Other scholars who visited the caves include Jack Golson, who explored the caves in 1957 as well as eminent archaeologist Janet Davidson.

== Geology ==
The caves are part of lava tubes, a result of old lava-flows near an extinct volcano called Sigaele in the island's volcanic interior. The islands of Samoa consist of high volcanic islands which have resulted in geological formations including caves and lava tubes, some which occur as water conduits and forming natural springs around the islands' coastlines, like the Mata o le Alelo Pool on Savai'i island and Piula Cave Pool on Upolu.

== Archaeology ==
Freeman describes in his report the entrance into the tunnels as almost circular and measuring approximately 50 ft (15 m) in diameter. The height above sea level at this point averaged about 1,555 ft (474 m).

The down-break opening had divided from what was once a single tunnel into two distinct sections, one to the north and one to the south. Freeman called the north section the North Cave and the south section the South Cave. The North Cave was a lot longer than the South Cave. Both caves were inhabited by Pe'ape'a (Collocalia francica), a species of swift and by many small bats.

=== North Cave ===
Entry into the North Cave was extremely confined and only four and a half feet (1.4 m) in height and three feet (0.91 m) in width. The length of the North Cave was 1,408 ft (429 m). Its width averaged at 25 ft (7.6 m) until at a distance from the entrance of about 850 ft (260 m), there was an amphitheater (maximum width 56 ft (17 m)) of considerable size which formed the center of a series of branches. The first branch was 150 ft (46 m), the second branch 900 ft (270 m), beyond which it was too confined for Freeman to measure. The height varied from 4 ft (1.2 m) at the entrance to 30 ft (9.1 m) in the amphitheater.

=== South Cave ===
In contrast to the confined entry to the North Cave, entry into the South Cave was 30 ft (9.1 m) wide and about 20 ft (6.1 m) high. Its length from the entry to termination was 513 ft (156 m), and there was no branching.

=== Findings ===
An elaborate system of rocky platforms were found in the caves, constructed mainly with pieces of fallen lava-rock and built up to a height of about 2 to 3 ft (0.61 to 0.91 m) above the cave floor. Freeman recorded 152 platforms, 129 in the north cave, and 23 in the south cave. He also found numerous umu cook sites, fireplaces, and kitchen-middens as well as several lumps of ele a type of red volcanic rock used as a natural dye for Samoan siapo or tapa, a traditional bark cloth material. He found 5 stone adzes, four in the North Cave and one in the South Cave, a common type of prehistoric adze found in Samoa. A small circular rubbing-stone was found by a platform, which Freeman surmised was used for sharpening and polishing.

== See also ==
- Archaeology in Samoa
