= Luatuanu'u =

Village in Upolu, Samoa

Coordinates: 13°52′S 171°41′W

Luatuanu'u is a village situated on the east side of Upolu island in Samoa. The village is part of Anoamaa West Electoral Constituency (Faipule District) which is within the larger political district of Atua.

The population is 832.
