= M. R. N. Holmer =

Mary Rebekah Norris Holmer (6 June 1875 – 2 September 1957) was a professor of physiology and biology at the Lady Hardinge Medical College, Delhi who was also on the Senate of the Punjab University. She was the first women to be a member of any university in India.

Holmer was born in London to William George, an iron merchant, and his wife Mary. She was privately tutored before going to Aske's Haberdashers' School and Newnham College. She obtained first class in the Natural Science Tripos at Cambridge and obtained an honorary M.A. from Dublin University. She taught at Dulwich High School (1897–1898), Bath High School (1898–1901), Llanelly High School (1901–1903), and was a lecturer at Bedford College (1903–1910) during which time she obtained a Teachers' Diploma from Oxford in 1906. She served as a secretary of the School Nature Study Union and ran courses on the teaching of natural history while at Bedford College. She worked at Goldsmiths' Training College (1910–13) and St. Mary's College (1913–15) before moving to India where she served as a professor of physiology at the Lady Hardinge Medical College from 1915 to 1922. She wrote about her method in teaching nature study, based mainly on common local plants, in a series of articles. She was made a Fellow of the Senate of the University of Punjab in 1918, and was the first woman senate member in an Indian university. She returned to England after that and worked as a part-time teacher at Holloway Prison from 1923 to 1939. She took a Bible class for adults and founded a school Nature Study Union. She wrote Indian Bird Life in 1923 which was revised and published as Bird Study in India (1926) with illustrations by Kay Nixon.
