= Rhys Richards =

New Zealand diplomat and historian

- Born: 1939 (age 86–87)
- Occupation: Diplomat
- Years active: 1980s to 2020s
- Known for: Historian
- Notable work: Whaling and Sealing at the Chatham Islands (1982)

Rhys Morgan Richards (born 1939) is a New Zealand historian, ethnographer and former diplomat. He has written extensively on maritime history and Pacific artifacts and art. He has spoken on these subjects on New Zealand radio and at conferences and seminars around the world.

== Early life ==
He attended the University of Canterbury in Christchurch, where he completed a Master of Arts degree with a 1962 thesis titled, An Historical Geography of Chatham Island.

== Diplomatic career ==
After graduating from university he worked as a career diplomat in the New Zealand Foreign Service. His diplomatic postings included New York, Hong Kong, Manila, Geneva, Apia, and Honiara. From 1996 to 1999, he was the New Zealand High Commissioner to the Solomon Islands and was responsible for overseeing New Zealand government aid to Melanesia.

He was a programme editor, writer and presenter for Radio New Zealand International. He has served as chairman of the Pacific Conservation and Development Trust.

== Historian ==
He describes his research as, "strongly committed to testing prevailing generalities through quantitive research drawing on primary materials." He has written many books, journal articles, chapters in books, book reviews and articles in newspapers. He has also contributed content to online resources, such as The Encyclopedia of New Zealand and the British Southern Whale Fishery website.

In 2000, he was presented with the 16th annual L. Byrne Waterman Award for his "outstanding contribution to maritime history," in a ceremony at The Kendall Whaling Museum, Massachusetts. In 2002, he held a Visiting Research Fellowship for Pacific Arts at the Sainsbury Research Unit at the University of East Anglia. In 2008, he was awarded a Tasmanian Research Fellowship by the State Library of Tasmania. He served on the committee of the Friends of the Turnbull Library (2000–2016).

David Stuart paid a 2024 tribute to Richards' work as a historian of the Pacific,

For over 40 years, Rhys Richards' writing has spanned the Age of Sail in the Pacific. He has sounded even the most remote islands in that ocean's vast expanses, exploring the history of Western contact and commerce, the many Indigenous cultures of the Pacific Islands and the impact of whaling and sealing on those societies and species. His Pacific credentials include diplomatic postings in Manila, Hong Kong, Apia and Honiara; managing the New Zealand government's aid programs in Melanesia, and more than two years at Radio New Zealand International.

== Select bibliography ==
- Whaling and sealing at the Chatham Islands (1982), Canberra, Roebuck, ISBN 0-909434-12-3
- Which Pakeha ate the last Moa, (1986) Wellington, Paremata Press.
- (editor), Frederick Hunt of Pitt Island, (1990), Petone, New Zealand, Lithographic Services, ISBN 047301128X
- (with R. A. Pierce), Captain Simeon Metcalfe: Pioneer fur trader in the Pacific Northwest, Hawaii and China, 1787-1794, (1991) Kingston, Ontario, Limestone Press, ISBN 0919642373
- (with Jocelyn Chisholm) Bay of Islands shipping arrivals and departures 1803-1840 (1992) Wellington, Paremata Press, ISBN 0-473-01601X
- Samoa's forgotten whaling heritage; American whaling in Samoan waters 1824-1848 (1992) Apia, Western Samoa Historical and Cultural Trust, ISBN 0-473-01607-9
- (editor) David Holmes, My 70 years on the Chatham Islands; reminiscences, (1993), Christchurch, Shoal Bay Press, ISBN 0908704178
- Into the South Seas: The Southern whale fishery comes of age on the Brazil Banks, 1765 to 1812; A review of the whaling activities of American, British, French, Spanish and Portuguese whalemen off Brazil and Patagonia before 1812, (1993) Wellington, Paremata Press & IWC, Brazil, ISBN 0473023873
- United States trade with China 1784-1814, (1994) Salem, Massachusetts, Special Supplement to Vol 54 of The American Neptune, ISSN 0003-0155
- The Foveaux yarns of Yankee Jack; Burr Osborn's adventures in southern New Zealand in 1845, (1995), Dunedin, Otago Heritage Press, ISBN 0908774125
- Murihiku re-viewed: a revised history of southern New Zealand from 1804 to 1844, (1995), Wellington, Lithographic Services, ISBN 0473028379
- (editor, with translation by Lene Knight) Jorgen Jorgenson's Observations on Pacific trade; and sealing and whaling in Australian waters before 1805 (1996) Wellington, The Paremata Press, ISBN 0-473-03971-0
- Honolulu centre of trans-Pacific trade; shipping arrivals and departures 1820 to 1840, (2000), Canberra, Pacific Manuscripts Bureau and the Hawaiian Historical Society, ISBN 0-7315-5210-5
- How many whales were killed in Pacific Forum EEZ's: a short review for Pacific Forum States, (2000), Wellington, R. Richards, ISBN 0473068257
- (with Margaret Richards) Pacific artifacts brought home by American whalemen; a report by Rhys and Margaret Richards for the New Bedford Whaling Museum; Pacific Islands curiosities, objects, artifacts and art in museums in New England and Long Island, (2000), Wellington, Paremata Press & The New Bedford Whaling Museum, ISBN 0473073773
- (editor) The Moriori language of the ancestors on the Chatham Islands: Reo Moriori o nga karapuna o Rekohu (2001), Wellington, Te Taa Haeretahi, the Hand in Hand Press, for the Paremata Press, ISBN 0958201315
- Pakeha around Porirua before 1840: sealers, whalers, flax traders and Pakeha visitors before the arrival of the New Zealand Company settlers at Port Nicholson in 1840, (2002) Wellington, Paremata Press, ISBN 0958201323
- (with Kenneth Roga) Not quite extinct: Melanesian bark cloth ('tapa') from western Solomon Islands; with interpretations by Reuben Lilo; and illustrations by Jackie Frizelle and Virginia Bond Korda, (February 2005, revised & reprinted October 2005), Wellington, Paremata Press, ISBN 0958201323
- Manu Moriori: Human and bird carvings on live Kopi trees on the Chatham Islands, (2007), Wellington, Paremata Press, ISBN 0958201374
- Tahiti and the Society Islands; shipping arrivals and departures 1767 to 1852, (2008) Canberra, Pacific Manuscripts Bureau and Jean-Louis Boglio Maritime Books, ISBN 9780980665307
- Easter Island 1793 to 1861: observations by early visitors before slave raids (2008), Los Osos, California, The Easter Island Foundation, ISBN 9781880636282
- (with Bill Carter) A decade of disasters; the Chatham Islands from 1866 to 1875, (2009), Wellington, Paremata Press, ISBN 9780473154714
- Sperm whaling on the Solanders Ground and in Fiordland; a maritime historian's perspective; NIWA Information Series No.76, (2010), Wellington, National Institute of Water and Atmospheric Research, ISSN 1174-264X
- Sealing in the southern oceans, 1788-1833, (2011), Wellington, Paremata Press, ISBN 9780473164805
- The Austral Islands; history, art and art history, (2012), Wellington, Paremata Press, ISBN 9780473188863
- Headhunters black and white: three collectors in the western Solomon Islands, 1893 to 1914, (2012) Wellington, Paremata Press, ISBN 9780473226794
- Captain Charles Bayley, whaling master, 1813-1875, (2014) Hobart, Navarine Publishing/Roebuck, ISBN 978-0-9923660-2-5
- Foreign visitors to the Cook Islands 1773 to 1840, (2014) Wellington, Paremata Press, ISBN 978-0-9582013-9-1
- Tracking travelling Taonga: A narrative review of how Maori artifacts got to London from 1798, to Salem in 1802, 1807 and 1812, and elsewhere globally up to 1840, (2015) Wellington, Paremata Press, ISBN 9780473331993
- Bold captains: trans-Pacific exploration and trade 1780-1830, Vol 1 & 2, (2017) Wellington, Paremata Press, ISBN 978-0-473-40518-2
- Moriori: origins, lifestyles and language, (2018) Wellington, Paremata Press, ISBN 9780473442026
- Kuphus polythalamia: alive or dead in the Western Solomon Islands?, (2019), Wellington, Paremate Press, ISBN 9780473469290
- (editor with Graeme Broxam), The last of the sail whalers: whaling off Tasmania and southern New Zealand / by Captain William McKillop (1865–1938), (2019) Hobart, Navarine Publishing. ISBN 9780992366070
- The First Pakehas around Wellington and Cook Strait: 1803 to 1839, (2020) Wellington, Paremata Press, ISBN 9780473516499
- Maori who went sperm whaling before 1840, (2021) Wellington, Paremata Press, ISBN 9780473587482
- Nga Tohora: The Right Whales of New Zealand and the Southern Oceans, (2023) Wellington, Paremata Press, ISBN 9780473680626
