= Richard Holmer =

Richard N Holmer (born 16 February 1945) is a professor of anthropology at Idaho State University. He has conducted extensive archaeological research in Mexico, Samoa, the American Desert West, and Alaska.

Born in Denver, Colorado, Holmer studied at the University of Utah where he completed his B.A. (1972), M.A. (1975) and Ph.D. (1978). He has taught at Idaho State University since 1983. Prior to his academic studies, Holmer had been a sergeant in the United States Army, Special Forces, stationed in North Carolina, Panama and Vietnam.

He has held various distinguished posts including Director positions at Idaho Museum of Natural History (1989–1993) and the Centre for Environmental Anthropology (1984–1998) as well as a Board of Director member at the Idaho Archaeological Society (1984–1986). He has been a Fellow of the Utah Professional Archaeological Council since 1983.

He has also published numerous books and monographs.
