= Jack Golson =

Archaeologist (1926–2023)

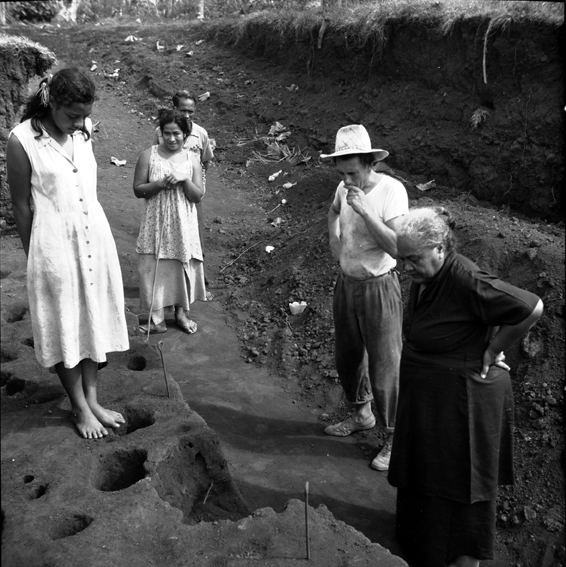
Golson excavating in Vailele, north coast of Upolu island in Samoa, 1957. Visiting the site are members of the I'iga Pisa family.

Jack Golson AO (13 September 1926 – 2 September 2023) was a British-born Australian archaeologist who carried out extensive field work in Melanesia, Polynesia and Micronesia.

== Life and career ==
Jack Golson was born in Rochdale, England on 13 September 1926. His father worked in the administration of coal mines in the area. He studied history and archaeology as an undergraduate at Cambridge University. He began a PhD in medieval history at Cambridge in 1951.

In 1954, he lectured at the archaeology department of Auckland University in New Zealand where he began studies on pre-history in the Pacific Islands. Golson also worked towards improving standards and methods of archaeology in New Zealand and organised the New Zealand Archaeological Association.

In 1957, he carried out the first systematic survey of archaeological remains on Savai'i island in Samoa. In 1961, he was appointed Fellow in Prehistory at the Australian National University and carried out research in Australia and Papua New Guinea. He was the president of the World Archaeological Congress (1990–1994).

In 1991, Golson retired after 30 years at the Australian National University. He became a visiting Fellow there while focusing his work on Papua New Guinea. In the 1997 Queen's Birthday Honours Golson was appointed Officer of the Order of Australia (AO) for "service to education, particularly in the fields of pre-history and archaeology research in Asia and the Pacific Region". In 2001 he was awarded the Centenary Medal.

In 2002, he became a Life Member of the Australian Archaeological Association. In 2009 he, along with Clare Golson, was awarded the World Archaeological Congress Inaugural Lifetime Achievement Award.

Golson died on 2 September 2023, at the age of 96.

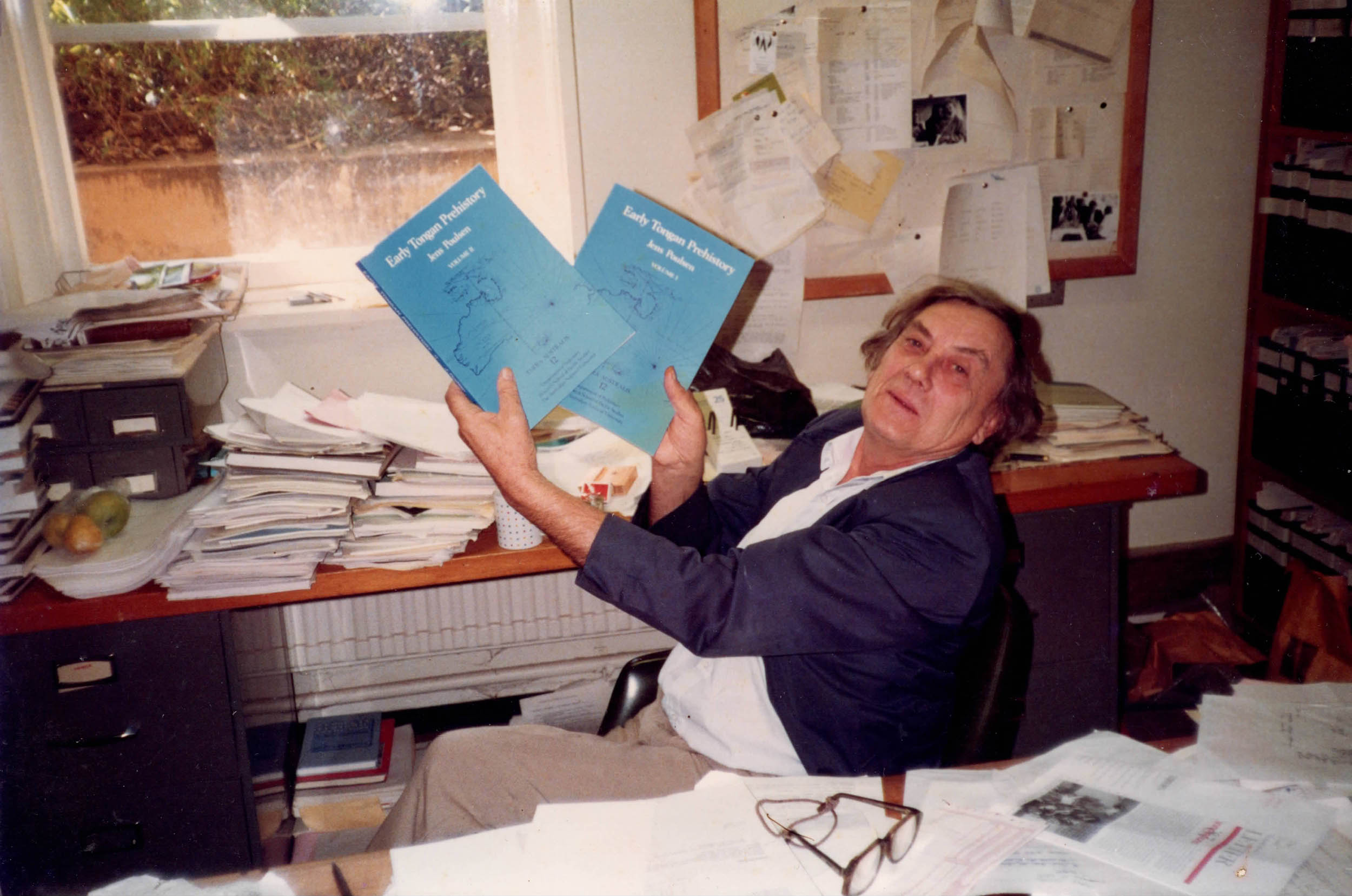
Jack Golson at ANU in 1987 after receiving Terra Australis 12, 'Early Tongan Prehistory' by Jens Poulsen, from the printer.

== See also ==
- History of Papua New Guinea
- Archaeology in Samoa
- History of Tonga
