= Districts of Samoa =

Samoa is divided into eleven itūmālō (political districts), which were established well before the arrival of Europeans. Each district has its own constitutional foundation (faavae), rooted in the traditional order of title precedence as outlined in its faalupega (traditional salutations).

The capital village of each district administers and coordinates the district's affairs and confers its paramount title, among other responsibilities.

== Examples of district governance ==
Aʻana's capital is Leulumoega. The paramount title of Aʻana is the Tui Aʻana, which is conferred by the orator group known as the Faleiva (House of Nine), based in Leulumoega. The paramount tama-a-‘āiga title of Aʻana is Tuimalealiifano, held in Falelatai.

Currently, there is no holder of the Tui A'ana title, as the orator polity of Leulumoega has yet to make a decision.

In Tuamasaga, the paramount matai title of Malietoa is conferred by the Sa Malietoa of Malie. The pāpā titles of Gatoaitele and Vaetamasoalii are known as pāpā fafine due to their origins with the original female occupants. Both titles are conferred by the Fale Tuamasaga, based in Afega and Safata, respectively.

The current holder of the Malietoa title is Malietoa Moli, son of the former Head of State, Malietoa Tanumafili II. The current holder of the Gatoaitele title is Savea Sano Malifa, owner of the Samoa Observer newspaper. There is currently no holder of the Vaetamasoalii pāpā title.

Atua's capital is Lufilufi, formerly part of Falefa, which was designated as its own village following the events that gave it its name. The paramount pāpā title and sovereign of Atua is the Tui Atua, conferred by the Faleono (House of Six), the senior orators of Lufilufi.

The two paramount matai titles, known as tama-a-'āiga, are Tupua Tamasese and Matā'afa. The Tupua Tamasese title is conferred by the Aiga Sa Fenunu'ivao (Descendants of Fenunu'ivao, mother of Tupua Fuiavailili) of Falefa and Salani, while the Matā'afa title is conferred by the Aiga Sa Levālasi (Descendants of Levālasi, mother of Salamāsina) of Lotofaga and Āmaile. Samoa's first Prime Minister, Fiame Matā'afa Faumuina Mulinu'u II, was a holder of the Matā'afa title.

The current holder of the Tupua Tamasese and Tui Atua titles is former Prime Minister and Head of State, Tui Atua Tupua Tamasese Efi.

== Political districts ==
Political Districts of Samoa
Nr.	District	Capital	Area (km^{2})	Population (Census 2016)
Upolu (including minor islands)
1	Tuamasaga	Afega	479	95,907
2	Aʻana	Leulumoega	193	23,265
3	Aiga-i-le-Tai^{1)}	Mulifanua	27	5,029
4	Atua^{2)}	Lufilufi	413	22,769
5	Vaʻa-o-Fonoti	Samamea	38	1,621
Savaiʻi
6	Faʻasaleleaga	Safotulafai	266	13,566
7	Gagaʻemauga^{3)}	Saleaula	223	7,840
8	Gagaʻifomauga	Aopo	365	4,878
9	Vaisigano	Asau	178	6,543
10	Satupaʻitea	Satupaʻitea	127	5,261
11	Palauli	Vailoa	523	9,300
	Samoa	Apia	2,831	195,979
^{1)}including islands Manono, Apolima and Nuʻulopa
^{2)}including the Aleipata Islands and Nuʻusafeʻe Island
^{3)}Exclaves Salamumu and Le'auva'a on Upolu

=== Exclaves of political districts ===
Note that several districts include multiple exclaves:

- Gaga'emauga: In addition to the main part on Savai'i, there are two small exclaves on Upolu: Salamumu and Le'auva'a. This is the only district with areas on both main islands.
- Satupa'itea: Consists of two separate areas on the south side of Savai'i.
- Palauli: Consists of two separate areas on the south side of Savai'i.
- A'ana: In addition to the main part, there is a small exclave (Satuimalufilufi village).
- Va'a-o-Fonoti: In addition to the main part, there is a small exclave (Faleāpuna village).
- Aiga-i-le-Tai: Includes the islands of Manono, Apolima, and Nu'ulopa.
- Atua: Includes the Aleipata Islands and Nu'usafe'e Island.

== Electoral districts ==
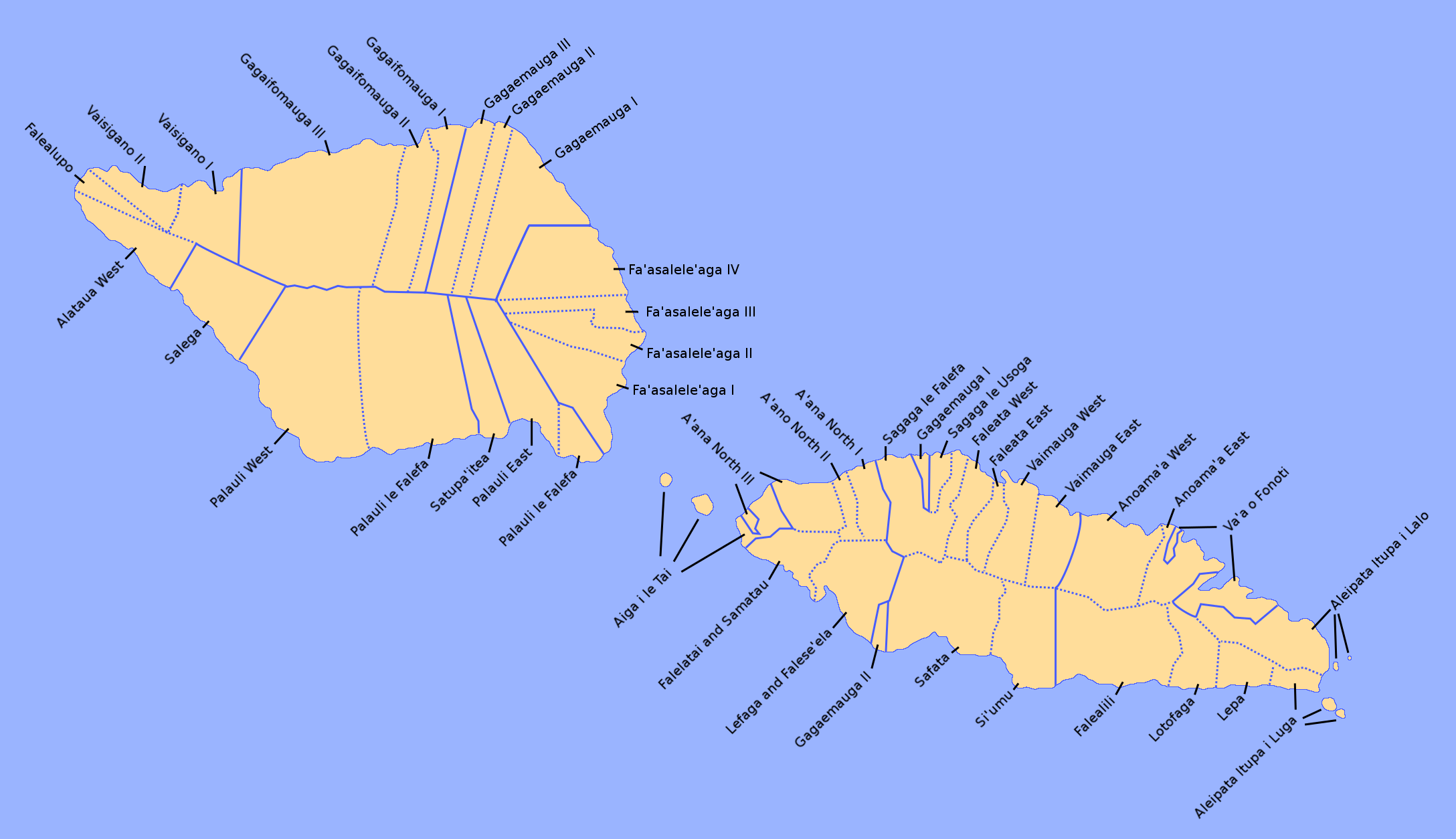

The itūmālō are further subdivided into 51 faipule districts. While they have no administrative function, they serve as single-member electoral constituencies and are also used as regional units for statistical purposes.

The faipule electoral districts are loosely based on the traditional sub-districts of the itūmālō. For example, the faipule districts of Anoama'a West and Anoama'a East are based on the traditional sub-district of Anoama'a in the northern half of the Atua district.

== Villages ==
At the local level, there are 265 villages. Additionally, the Tuamasaga district includes 71 villages, with the capital, Apia, composed of 58 villages in the Vaimauga West electoral district and 13 villages in the Faleata East electoral district. Apia does not have a unified administration; local power rests with the constituent villages.

== See also ==
- List of cities, towns and villages in Samoa
- ISO 3166-2:WS
