= List of mountains in Samoa =

The following is a list of mountains in Samoa.

Mountains are referred to as mauga in the Samoan language.

Summit	Height (m)	Prominence (m)	Coordinates
Silisili	1,858	1,858	13°37′06″S 172°29′09″W
Mauga Afi	1,847	292	13°34′S 172°29′W
Mauga Si'ope	1,845	73	
Mount Mata’aga	1,739	51	
Mauga Mū	1,668	5	
Mata o le Afi	1,647	18	13.6087°S 172.5076°W
Mount Mua	1,589	23	
Mauga Te'elagi	1,513	37	
Mount Fa’ani	1,315	17	
Mauga Mana'omia	1,271	79	
Mount Maugaloa	1,210	108	
Mauga To'iave'a	1,082	167	
Mount Vaivai	1,158		
Mount Fito	1,149	149	
Mount Elietoga	1,047	51	
Mauga Tele	1,038	400	
Mount Le Pu’e	1,028	92	
Mauga Mafane	1,025	159	
Mauga Ve'a	975	69	
Mount Mulimauga	941	95	
Mauga Mata'ulano	932	11	
Mount Fiamoe	930	150	
Mount Siga’ele	856	200	
Mauga Olomanuuta	850	1	
Mauga Maungaloa	845	26	
Mauga Olomanutai	748	15	
Fuiave’a	736	11	
Mount Fao	722	491	
Mount Parasit	713	0	
Mount Matavanu	575		13°32′S 172°24′W
Mount Vaitoa	673	0	
Mauga Olo	661	40	
Tafua-upolu	660	300	13°52′39.73″S 171°57′47.54″W
Mount Talito’elau	660	25	
Mount Puna	634	52	
