= ISO 3166-2:WS =

Entry for Samoa in ISO 3166-2

ISO 3166-2:WS is the entry for Samoa in ISO 3166-2, part of the ISO 3166 standard published by the International Organization for Standardization (ISO), which defines codes for the names of the principal subdivisions (e.g., provinces or states) of all countries coded in ISO 3166-1.

The abbreviation is derived from Western Samoa, the country's former name until 1997.

Currently for Samoa, ISO 3166-2 codes are defined for 11 districts.

Each code consists of two parts, separated by a hyphen. The first part is WS, the ISO 3166-1 alpha-2 code of Samoa. The second part is two letters.

== Current codes ==
Subdivision names are listed as in the ISO 3166-2 standard published by the ISO 3166 Maintenance Agency (ISO 3166/MA).

Click on the button in the header to sort each column.

Code	Subdivision name (sm, en)
WS-AA	A'ana
WS-AL	Aiga-i-le-Tai
WS-AT	Atua
WS-FA	Fa'asaleleaga
WS-GE	Gaga'emauga
WS-GI	Gagaifomauga
WS-PA	Palauli
WS-SA	Satupa'itea
WS-TU	Tuamasaga
WS-VF	Va'a-o-Fonoti
WS-VS	Vaisigano

== See also ==
- Subdivisions of Samoa
- FIPS region codes of Samoa
