= Vailuutai =

Coordinates: 13°49′43.46″S 171°58′39.32″W

Vailuutai is a village on the island of Upolu in Samoa. The village is part of A'ano Alofi 4 Electoral Constituency (Faipule District) which forms part of the larger A'ana political district.

The population is 870.
