= Lepale =

Samoan Village

Coordinates: 13°52′13″S 171°54′48″W

Lepale is a village on the island of Upolu in Samoa. The village is part of A'ano Alofi 2 Electoral Constituency (Faipule District) which forms part of the larger A'ana political district.

The population is 147.
