= Tamafaiga =

Tamafaiga or Tamafainga (died 1829) was a Samoan king.

Leiatualesā Tamafaiga was a god-King war-priest from Manono Island who usurped the throne after the death of Safeofafine. He came to power after defeating Mataʻafa in 1827 or 1828. He ruled as a tyrant, and was worshiped as a god. The missionary John Williams reported that "he was the man in whom the spirit of the gods dwelt... the terror of all the inhabitants". He was killed by the people from the village Fasitoouta. He was killed after attempting to claim a daughter name Fuatino of their high chief name Leaupepe as his hundredth wife. Following his death Malietoa decimated Aʻana as punishment, and eventually claimed the kingship.
