= Ulia Ulia =

Samoa international rugby union player

- Born: Ulia Ulia; June 13, 1980 (age 46) Afega, Samoa
- Height: 1.83 m (6 ft 0 in)
- Weight: 102 kg (225 lb)
- Notable relative(s): Kenneth Ulia, Elaine Ulia, Desiree Amy Ulia and Havilani Elizabeth Ulia.

Rugby union career
- Position: Flanker
- Current team: Savai'i Samoa
- Correct as of 16 January 2011
International career
Years	Team	Apps	(Points)
2004-2007	Samoa	11	(5)
- Correct as of 16 January 2011

Ulia Ulia (born 13 June 1980, in Afega) a Samoa n rugby union flanker. He is married to Epenesa Luana Zerina Esera-Ulia and has 1 kid : MAGAUI Ulia David Ulia.Parents Ututa'aloga Charlie Ulia and Elizabeth Lameta-Ulia. Siblings of 5 kids: Kenneth Ulia, Ulia Ulia, Elaine Ulia, Desiree Amy Ulia and Havilani Elizabeth Ulia. He was a member of the Samoa national rugby union team that participated at the 2007 Rugby World Cup.
