= Tafua-upolu =

Active cinder cone in Samoa

- Location within Samoa

Highest point
- Elevation: 660 m (2,170 ft)
- Prominence: 300 m (980 ft)
- Coordinates: 13°52′39.73″S 171°57′47.54″W

Tafua-upolu is an active cinder cone in the Aʻana district of the island of Upolu in Samoa. The name tafua is derived from the Tongan tofua (fire-mountain or volcano). Radiocarbon dating suggests it last erupted between 1300 and 1395 CE.
