= Namoa Island =

Namoa Island may be:

- Namua, Samoa
- Namoa, China
