= Afega =

Afega, Samoa
- Village
- Location within Samoa
- Coordinates: 13°48′7″S 171°49′18″W
- Country: Samoa
- District: Tuamasaga

Population (2016)
  - Total: 1,998
- Time zone: -11

Afega is a village on the island of Upolu in Samoa. It is located on the central north coast of the island to the west of the capital Apia in the countryside. The population is 1998.

Afega is part of electoral constituency (faipule district) Sagaga Le Usoga which is part of the larger political district Tuamasaga.

== Sports people ==
Afega is the home of some of the great athletes from Samoa, including;

- Alafoti Fa'osiliva, rugby union player for the Samoa Sevens and Manu Samoa.
- Rita Fatialofa-Paloto, the New Zealand netball international and the head coach for the Samoa national netball team.
- Ulia Ulia, the former rugby union player for the national team Manu Samoa
- Leu Vaetolu, the three times gold medalist in South Pacific Games
- Nathan Filemoni Faavae, the New Zealand national champion in mountain bike competition.
- Saiaiga Salevalasi Faosiliva Motuloa Maulolo Toevai, Youngest Half-Back in Samoa Women's Rugby Club 2005 transferred club from Oriental Bay Wellington. Supporting her along the way Ma'a Nonu & Roy Kinikinilau also members of Oriental Bay Rugby Club.
- Toafitu Perive, an Olympic weightlifter who competed in the 2012 Summer Olympics.
