= Nuʻusafeʻe =

Small island in Atua District, Samoa

Coordinates: 14°03′S 171°41′W

Nuʻusafeʻe Island is a small, uninhabited island in Samoa. The island is located off the southeast coast of Upolu Island, near the Upolu villages of Poutasi.

The islet is a motu on the edge of Upolu's fringing reef, with an area of 0.02 square kilometers and a maximum elevation of 3 to 4 metres above sea level. It is covered by littoral forest dominated by Calophyllum inophyllum, Cerbera manghas, Barringtonia asiatica, and Terminalia catappa. A small cultivated area on the north side includes Coconut, Breadfruit, and Inocarpus fagifer.

The island is home to three species of land birds, including the Samoan starling, Polynesian starling, and Polynesian wattled honeyeater.
