= Lufilufi =

- Village
- Location within Samoa
- Coordinates: 13°51′S 171°35′W
- Country: Samoa
- District: Atua

Population (2016)
  - Total: 949
- Time zone: -11

Lufilufi is a historical village situated on the north coast of Upolu island in Samoa. The village is part of the electoral constituency (Faipule District) Anoamaa East which is within the larger political district of Atua. The village's population is 949.

Lufilufi is the traditional center of the Atua district and is the residence of the royal Tui Atua pāpā title. Governed by the 'Faleono' (House of six) orator group, it is also vested with the authority to appoint the Tui Atua. Lufilufi's honorific salutation includes the title of 'Matua o Atua', (the Head, or Elder of Atua).

== Origins ==
Lufilufi was part of the older territory of Falefa until the reign of Tui Atua Polailevao. A chief by the name of Velova'a (also called Tautaifau in other versions) was out fishing and having caught enough fish, prepared to head to Asau to visit his father, Tufuga. As he passed through the area, he was hailed by the Tui Atua and summoned into his residence - Mulinu'ū ma Sepolata'emo - where the boy Seleanamani was present, serving the Tui Atua. Seleanamani was then ordered to divide the fish and distribute it to the three great districts of Atua: Anoama'a along the northern coast, Itu Salefao along the southern coast, and Aleipata on the Easter end. The head of the fish was to be sent to Aleipata, the body to remain in Anoama'a, and the tail was given to Itu Salefao, on the south coast of Atua.

Having been pleased with Seleanamani's skill at dividing the fish, the Tui Atua hailed him as Selelimalelei and designated the place of this event as Lufilufi (which means the cutting up of food). The charter and salutations of Atua make reference to this story in its salutations to the three respective districts of Atua, salutations based upon the origins of Lufilufi:

Tulouna ao o Atua (Aleipata)

Tulouna uso o Atua (Anoama'a)

Tulouna i'u o Atua (Itu Salefao)

== Seat of power ==
Lufilufi is the political centre of Atua. The sovereign of Atua is the Tui Atua, who both resides and has its investiture ceremony at Mulinu'ū ma Sepolata'emo in Lufilufi. Within Lufilufi is the Faleono (House of six), six families whose orators govern Lufilufi are vested with the authority to appoint the Tui Atua. Lufilufi's Faleono and its attendant privileges mirror that of its Tumua counterpart Faleiva in Leulumoega. Mulinu'ū ma Sepolata'emo is also where the tama-a-aiga Tupua Tamasese title investiture ceremony is held.

Lufilufi's authority in Atua is reflected by its title as Matua o Ātua, (the elder of Ātua). The six orators of Lufilufi also summon the Fale Atua (what can be called the 'parliament' of Ātua), to ascertain its members views on a prospective holder of the pāpā Tui Atua title when the title is vacant. The Fale Atua decides with the Tui Ātua in matters of war and state. This 'parliament' comprises the six tulafale of Lufilufi and 13 other senior matai of Ātua - the respective rulers of Falefā, Solosolo, Saleaumua, Luatuanu'u. Samusu, Lotofaga, Saoluafata and Lepā. Of those 13 matai, nine are tulafale and four are ali'i. The members of Ātua's governing parliament form an exclusive group, as only the most senior matai in Ātua can sit in it.

At various times throughout its history, Lufilufi has been the seat of the malo - executive power. This has been contested between Lufilufi and Leulumoega throughout Samoa's history, with notable exceptions to this norm from Manono during the rule of Tamafaiga.

== See also ==
- Archaeology in Samoa
- Situated in Lufilufi is the Methodist Piula Theological College and Piula Cave Pool.
