= Leulumoega =

Leulumoega Tuai
- Village District
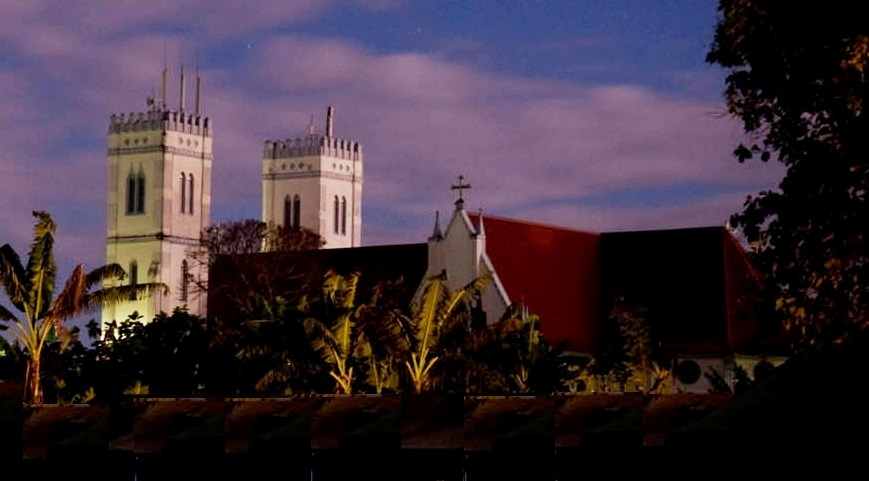
- Roman Catholic Basilica Sancta Ana

- Location within Samoa
- Coordinates: 13°49′S 171°55′W
- Country: Samoa
- District: A'ana

Population (2016)
  - Total: 1,184
- Time zone: -11

Leulumoega Tuai is a village situated on the northwest coast Upolu island in Samoa. The village is part of the A'ana Alofi 3 Electoral Constituency (Faipule District) which forms part of the larger A'ana political district.

Leulumoega is the traditional center of the A'ana district.

The population of Leulumoega is 1184.
