= Atua (district) =

Coordinates: 13°57′S 171°38′W

Ātua
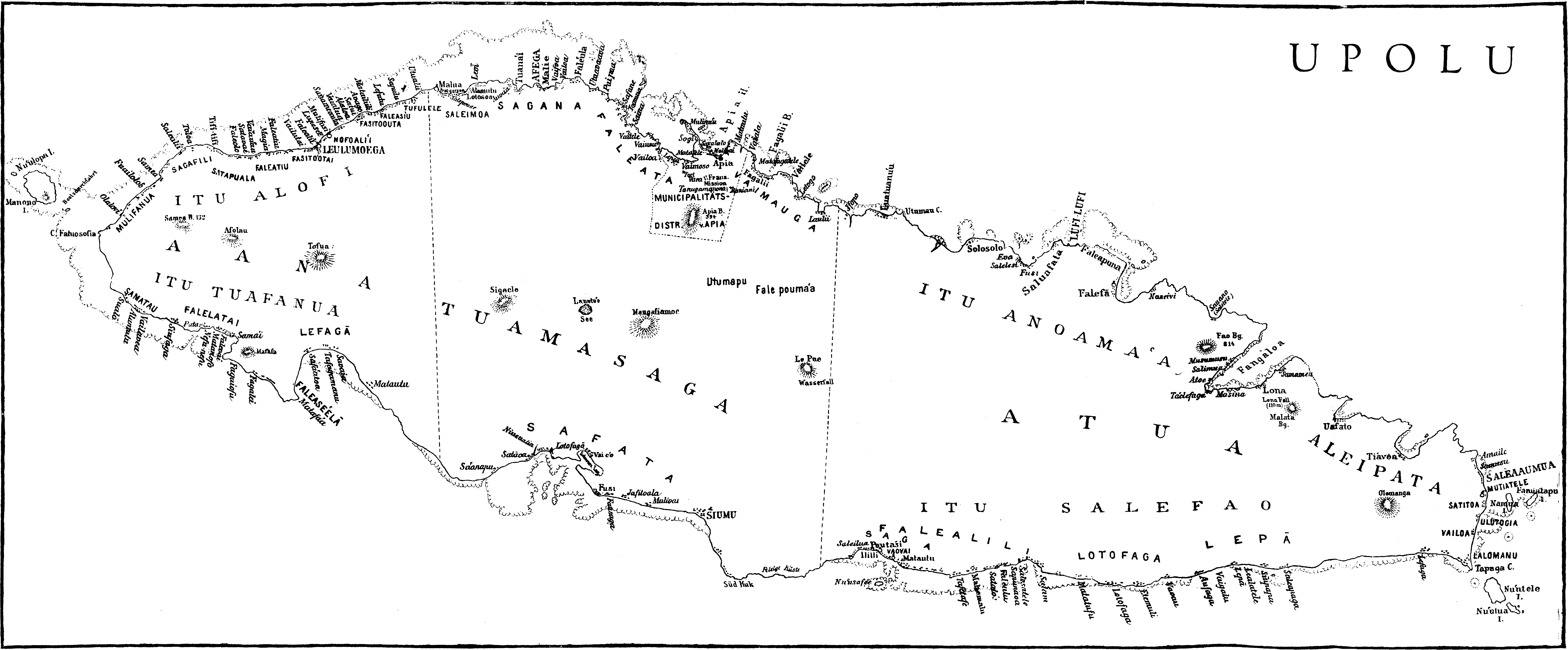
- Ātua, comprising the eastern third of Upolu Island on map of 1924

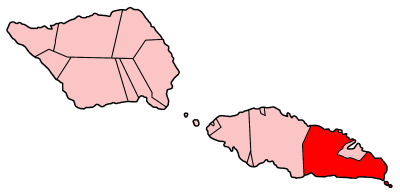
- Map of Samoa showing Atua district
- Country: Samoa

Government

Population (2016)
  - Total: 22,769
- Time zone: +13

Ātua is an ancient political district of Samoa, consisting of most of the eastern section of Upolu and the island Tutuila. Within Samoa's traditional polity, Ātua is ruled by the Tui Ātua together with the group of six senior orators of Lufilufi and 13 senior matai from throughout Ātua, comprising the Fale Ātua (or parliament of Atua). The fono (meeting) of Atua's rulers takes place in Lufilufi on the great malae of Lalogafu'afu'a.

The paramount pāpā title and sovereign of Ātua is the Tui Ātua. The title traces its lineage to Pili, son of Tagaloa-a-lagi. The first Tui Atua was Lufasiaitu who lived around 700AD. It is from his lifetime that the known pre-European history of Samoa associated with the Tui Ātua and its holders began. The current Tui Ātua is former Prime Minister, Head of State and tama-a-aiga, Tui Atua Tupua Tamasese Efi. The Tui Atua title is the oldest active title in Polynesia.

The two paramount matai titles of Ātua are the two Tama-a-aiga titles of Tupua Tamasese and Matā'afa, respectively belonging to the two main noble lineages of Ātua: Sā Fenunuivao (descendants of Salamasina through Fenunu’ivao, adoptive mother of Tupua) of Falefa and Salani; and Sā Levālasi (descendants of Levalasi, adoptive mother of Salamasina) of Amaile and Lotofaga. Both titles belong to Sā Tupua one of the two maximal lineages of Samoa.

== History ==
According to one legend, Tagaloa-a-lagi (the Samoan supreme god), entered Upolu, Savai'i and Tonga from Manu'a island on the eastern tip of the Samoan archipelago. The political divisions of Upolu are said to be traced to his son, Pili. Pili had three sons - Tua, 'Ana (who were twins) and Saga, after whom the political divisions of Upolu are named. Tua founded the political district of Ātua (literally, 'that of Tua'), which comprised the eastern third of Upolu Island. 'Ana founded Ā'ana ('that of Ana), a political district on the western third of the island. The third son, Saga, was born after the twins and so the district he founded was called Tuamasaga ('after the twin'). This was the geographical region between Ā'ana and Ātua districts. Since then, the three political districts of Upolu have been called Ātua, Ā'ana and Tuamasaga.

== Geography ==
Located on the eastern third of Upolu, the geography of Atua comprises the mountainous interior separating the northern and southern coasts, the long sandy beaches of the southern coast from Aleipata to Poutasi, and the rocky coastline of Anoama'a in the north. Within Atua is the small itumalo of Va'a o Fonoti, a separate political district surrounded by Atua. The island of Tutuila is a traditional exclave of Atua and is its easternmost point located in what is now American Samoa.

== Governance ==
The Tui Atua title is bestowed at Mulinu'ū ma Sepolata'emo, in Lufilufi, the capital of Ātua by the Faleono (House of six) orator group of Lufilufi, who are vested with the authority to appoint the Tui Atua and whose authority is reflected by its title as Matua o Ātua, (the elder of Ātua). These six tulafale also summon the Fale Atua (what can be called the 'parliament' of Ātua), to ascertain its members views on a prospective holder of their papa title when the title is vacant. This 'parliament' comprises the six tulafale of Lufilufi and 13 other senior matai from throughout Ātua. Of those 13 matai, nine are tulafale and four are ali'i. The members of Ātua's governing parliament form an exclusive group, as only the most senior matai in Ātua can sit in it.

The Fale Atua ('parliament of Atua') decide with the Tui Ātua in matters of war and state. The Fale Atua comprises the six orators of Lufilufi as well as the respective rulers of Falefā, Solosolo, Lalomanu, Lotofaga, Luatuanu'u. Samusu, Saoluafata, Saleaumua, and also Lepā.

== The Tui Atua ==
The line of Tui Atua extends far back into the early history of Samoa, beyond that of Queen Salamasina's reign, to the sons of Pili, descendant of the Tui Manu'a (sovereign of Manu'a). According to legend, Tagaloa-a-lagi (Samoa's supreme god), entered Upolu, Savai'i and Tonga from Manu'a island on the eastern tip of the Samoan archipelago. The political divisions of Upolu are said to be traced to his son, Pili. Pili had three sons - Tua, 'Ana (who were twins) and Saga, after whom the political divisions of Upolu are named. Tua founded the political district of Ātua (literally, 'that of Tua'), which comprised the eastern third of Upolu Island. 'Ana founded Ā'ana ('that of Ana), a political district on the western third of the island. The third son, Saga, was born after the twins and so the district he founded was called Tuamasaga ('after the twin'). This was the geographical region between Ā'ana and Ātua districts. Since then, the three political districts of Upolu have been called Ātua, Ā'ana and Tuamasaga.

Prior to the reign of Queen Salamasina, the Tui Atua was held at different times by the ranking alii of Atua, including Lufasiaitu and Mua'iteleloa of Fagaloa, Leutele of Falefa (known as Tui Atua Leuteleleiite), and the tulafale-alii polities of Fuataga and Tafua in Aleipata. From the first Tui Atua to Queen Salamasina and then from her to her descendants, the title has passed down along these lineages according to the prevalent power of the time. Since the rise of the tama-a-aiga Tupua Tamasese and later, Mata'afa in the late 1700s, the Tui Atua mantle has remained exclusively between these two, with the exception of Malietoa Vainuupo, Malietoa Moli and Sualauvi I holding it in the aftermath of multiple conflicts.

=== Tui Atua from Salamasina to Tupua Tamasese Efi ===
Tui Atua from the time of Tafa'ifā Salamasina onwards:

- Tui Atua Salamasina*
- Tui Atua Taufau*
- Tui Atua Faumuina
- Tui Atua Fonoti*
- Tui Atua Muagututi'a*
- Tui Atua Tupua Fuiavailili*
- Tui Atua Afoafouvale*
- Tui Atua Galumalemana*
- Tui Atua Paitomaleifi
- Tui Atua Mataafa Faasuamale’aui
- Tui Atua Nofoasaefā*
- Tui Atua I'amafana*
- Tui Atua Safeofafine*
- Tui Atua Malietoa Vainu'upō*
- Tui Atua Malietoa Molī
- Tui Atua Mata'afa Fagamanu
- Tui Atua Sualauvi*
- Tui Atua Tupua Tamasese Titimaea
- Tui Atua Mata'afa Lauifi
- Tui Atua Tupua Tamasese Lealofi-o-a'ana I
- Tui Atua Tupua Tamasese Lealofi-o-a'ana II
- Tui Atua Tupua Tamasese Lealofi-o-a'ana IV
- Tui Atua Tupua Tamasese Efi
- * indicates holder of all four papa titles (Tui Atua, Tui A'ana, Gatoaitele & Vaetamasoalii)

== Fa'alupega o Atua: The Charter and Salutations of Atua ==
=== 'O le ao tetele o Atua (The Great Honours of Atua) ===
Tulouna 'oe Lufilufi

tulouna 'oe le Tumua

tulouna lo outou Faleono

tulouna le afio o le Tui Atua

ma Tupa'i ma Ta'inau

tulouna 'Togia'i, 'o le Tui Atua ave au malaga ia te oe, Lufilufi pe a lafalafatūga

tulouna Leausa ne itu'au ai e alataua ai

tulouna ao o Atua

tulouna uso o Atua

tulouna i'u o Atua

tulouna le fetalaiga a Tuu'u na itu fā ai Atua

tulouna le āiga Sā Levalasi

tulouna le āiga Sā Fenunuivao

tulouna a tulaniu o Atua.

== Population ==
The district has a population (2016 Census) of 22,769.
