= Aʻana =

District of Samoa

- District
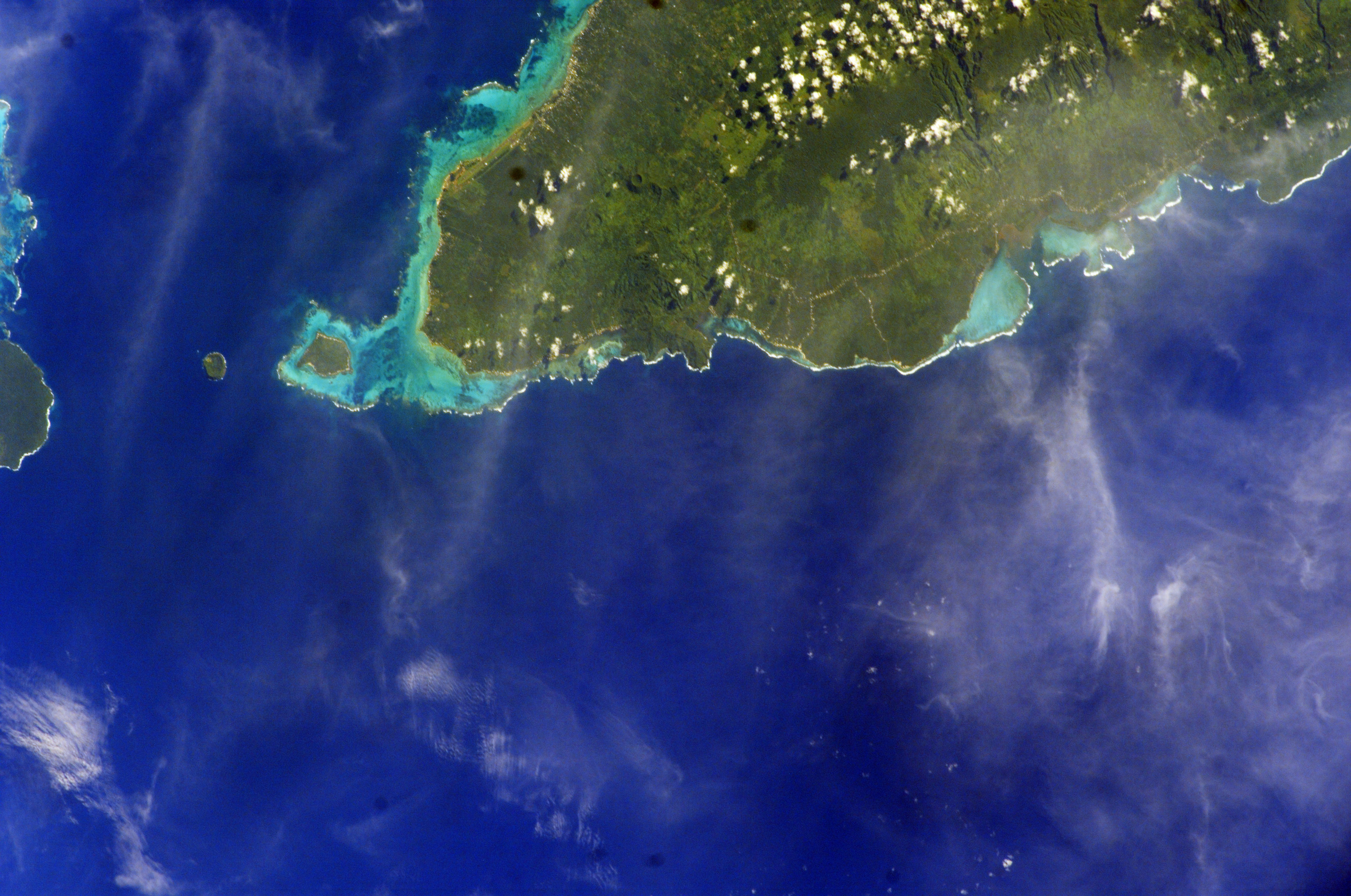
- Satellite image of A'ana district, west end of Upolu with tiny Manono & Apolima islands to the west. (NASA photo, 2009).

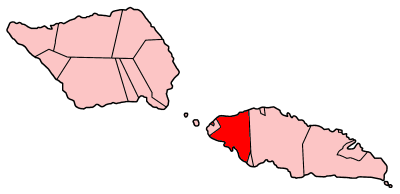
- Map of Samoa showing A'ana district
- Coordinates: 13°53′27.35″S 171°59′14.56″W
- Country: Samoa

Population (2016)
  - Total: 23,265
- Time zone: UTC−11

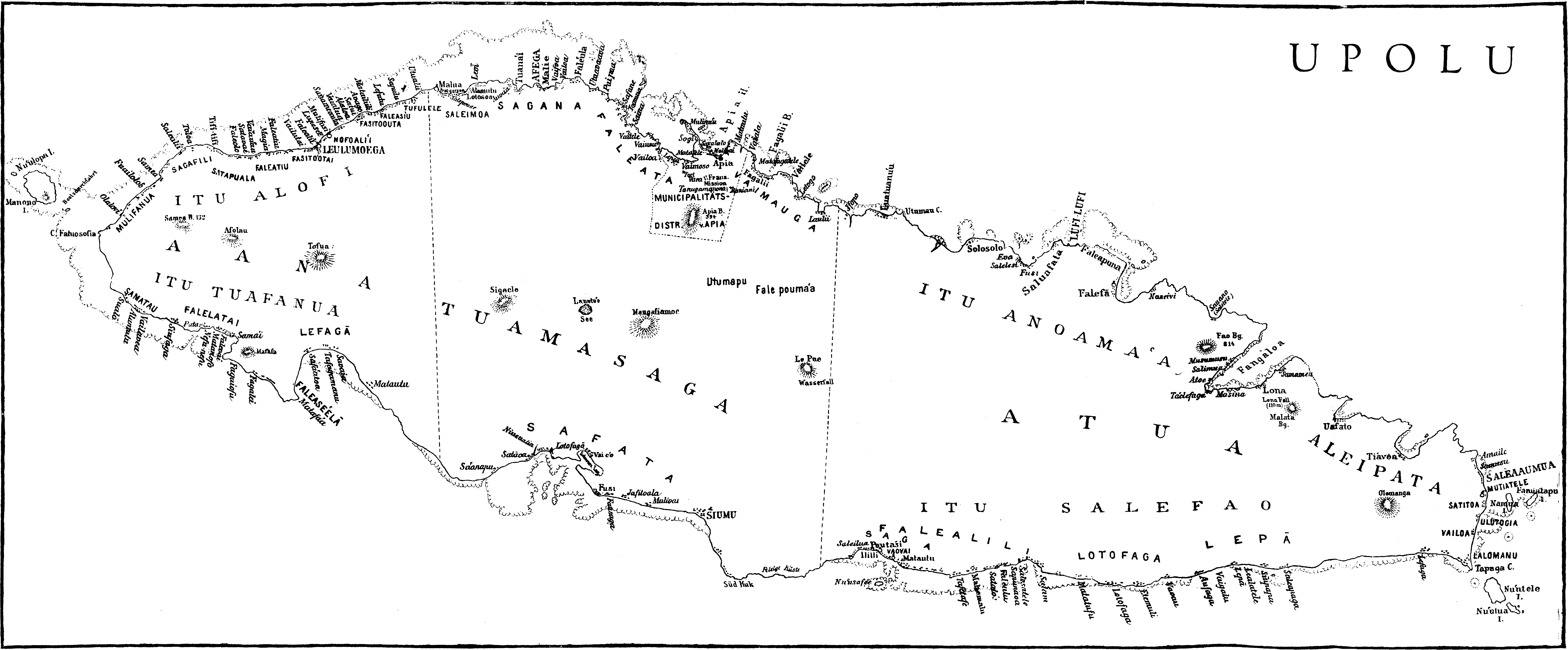
Aana district on the map of 1924

Aʻana is a district of Samoa. It is on the western third of Upolu island, with a small exclave (Satuimalufilufi village) surrounded by Aiga-i-le-Tai. It has an area of 193 km^{2} and a population (2016 Census) of 23,265. The main centre is Leulumoega.

== Overview ==
The Aʻana District comprises approximately 18 villages from Faleasiu in the North to Matautu in the South. The district encompasses the western portion of Upolu except for the extreme Western promontory, belonging to Aiga i le Tai district. Traditionally the northern part of the district was known as 'Itu Alofi', (Gathering side or Assembly side), as the Northern villages held a lot of the political power in historical times, whilst the Southern side was known as 'Itu Tufanua', (the backward side or the uncivilised side). It is a common occurrence in Samoa that the northern areas of both Upolu and Savaii usually held a lot of the political power especially as many of the principal villages being located in the Northern areas. Traditionally the principal village is Leulumoega, in ancient times the gathering place for the entire district. The villages are located at the coast with the exception of small inland enclaves. Also located within the district is Faleolo International Airport, the main airport within Samoa. The district although having no industrial business or enterprises, contains the usual family operated stores as well as one petrol station in Fasitoouta. The mountain inland is Mt Tafua-upolu, with a number of foothills at its base. The lagoon s around the entire Aana district is encompassed by the great reef that surrounds the entire island of Upolu. The soil is mostly volcanic as the past testifies, many of the old German plantation lands are located within Aana, as the soil is fertile.

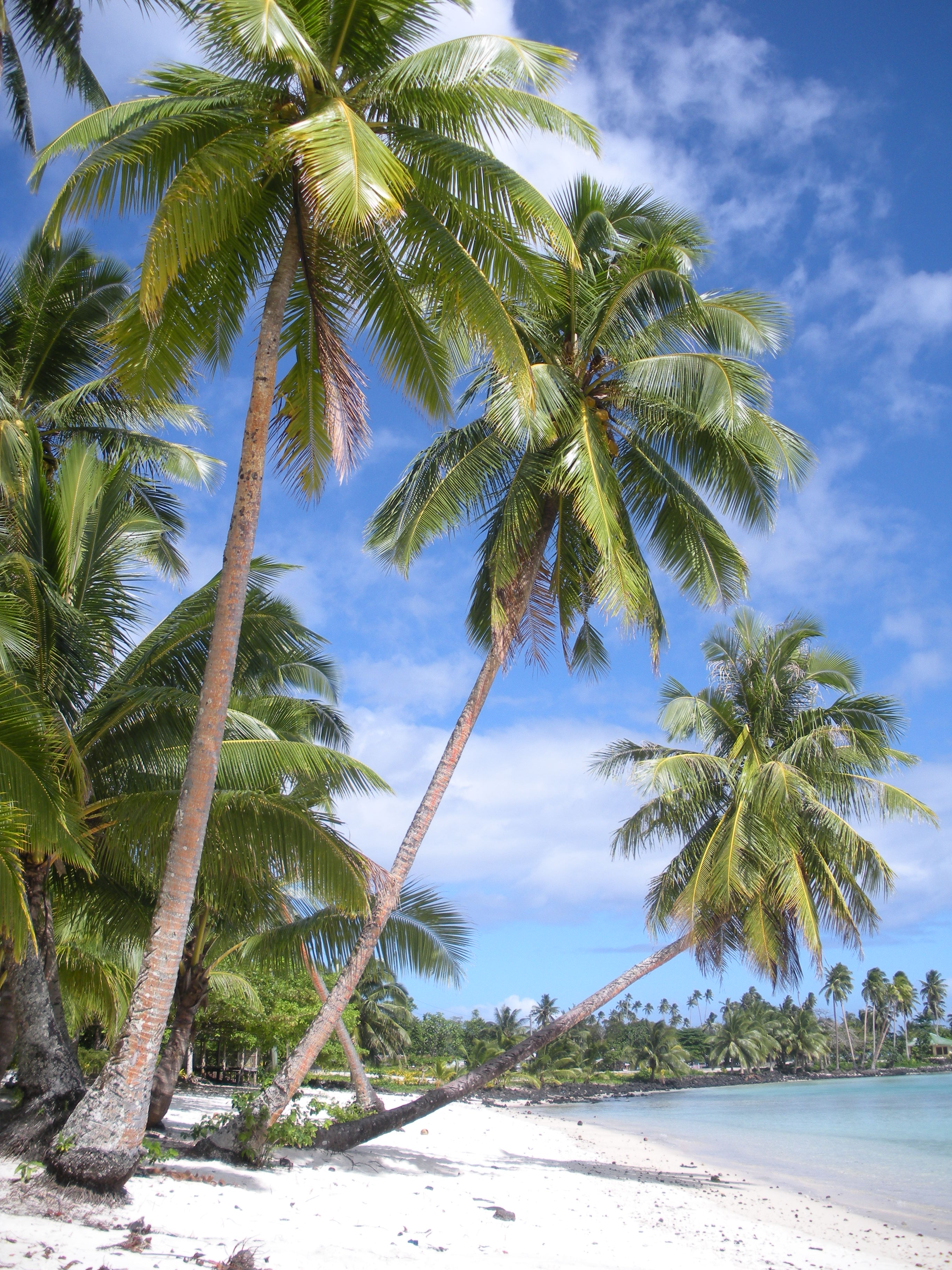
Lefaga coastline, 'Return to Paradise' beach, south coast Upolu 2009

== History ==
According to legend, Tagaloa-a-lagi (Samoan's supreme god), entered Upolu, Savaiʻi and Tonga from Manuʻa island on the eastern tip of the Samoan archipelago. The political divisions of Upolu are said to be traced to his son, Pili. Pili had three sons - Tua, 'Ana (who were twins) and Saga, after whom the political divisions of Upolu are named. Tua founded the political district of Ātua (literally, 'that of Tua'), which comprised the eastern third of Upolu island. 'Ana founded Ā'ana ('that of Ana), a political district on the western third of the island. The third son, Saga, was born after the twins and so the district he founded was called Tuamasaga ('after the twin'). This was the geographical region between Ā'ana and Ātua districts. Since then, the three political districts of Upolu have been called Ātua, Ā'ana and Tuamasaga.

Historically, Aʻana and Atua have been allies, save for a few instances when political maneuvering of ambitious chiefs and the pressures of one Tamafaiga of Manono led to a long period of tension between the two. The paramount pāpā title is Tuiaana, whose residence is Nuuausala in Leulumoega, also the location of one of the main centres of Tumua. Ever since the end of the Tongan period of dominance, Aana held a lot of the political power. This began with the kidnap of the aristocratic linked infant Tamalelagi, by the orators Tutuila and Ape, (Fasitootai and Fasitoouta respectively). Tamalelagi was bestowed with the Tuiaana with assistance of the warrior goddess Nafanua and from him are descended many of the high ranking chiefs of Samoa. His daughter, Salamasina is recognised as one of Samoa's most celebrated rulers, having been the first person to unite the papa titles, Tuiaana, Tuiatua, Gatoaitele, Vaetamasoalii. This made her Tafaifa being the most paramount chief in Samoa especially in Upolu. Through her many of the ancient and royal lineages trace descent from her. Her residence was at Nuuausala in Leulumoega and with her royal linkage, she made Aana powerful. The prestige and power of Aana however vanished having not paying heed to Nafanua's instructions to be prepared for the day when she came to install the government at Leulumoega. Having been badly received by Leulumoega, she returned to Savaii via Manono and instead gave the government to Leiataua of Manono who therefore passed his government to his son, the famous Tamafaiga. Tamafaiga's assassination by the men of Fasitoouta initiated the Great Aana War of 1828 - 1830, which led to the complete decimation of A'ana and subjugation under the Manono-based Tamafaiga malo for many years. The war involved Aiga i le tai, the northern districts of Savaii as well as Tuamasaga as Malietoa was akin with Tamafaiga and was obliged to seek vengeance. This meant devastation for Aana, especially the Itu Alofi. This coincided with the arrival of John Williams in Sapapalii in Savaii and was a fitting end to the great ancient wars of Samoa. The many prisoners caught of Aana were burned in a great bonfire lit at Maota in Fasitootai and ended the long period of prominence A'ana had held in Samoa, until its resurgence in the late 19th century.

At a national level, the district is home to one of the four Tama-a-Aiga titles in the Tuimalealiifano title based at Falelatai. Aana is divided into 5 electoral constituencies.
