= Samoa =

Island country in the Pacific Ocean

Independent State of Samoa Malo Saʻoloto Tutoʻatasi o Sāmoa
- Flag Seal
- Motto: Faʻavae i le Atua Sāmoa "Samoa is founded on God"
- Anthem: O Le Fuʻa o le Saʻolotoga o Sāmoa "The Banner of Freedom"
- Location of Samoa

- Map of Samoa
- Capital and largest city: Apia; 13°50′00″S 171°45′44″W
- Official languages: Samoan; English
- Ethnic groups (2021): 92.6% Samoans; 7.0% Euronesians; 0.3% Europeans; 0.1% others
- Religion (2021): 97.9% Christianity (official); 54.9% Protestantism; 18.8% Catholicism; 16.9% Mormonism; 7.3% other Christian; 1.7% no religion; 0.4% others
- Demonym: Samoan
- Government: Unitary parliamentary republic
  - O le Ao o le Malo (Note: Head of state): Tuimalealiʻifano Vaʻaletoʻa Sualauvi II
  - Prime Minister: Laʻauli Leuatea Schmidt
  - Assembly Speaker: Auapaʻau Mulipola Aloitafua
- Legislature: Legislative Assembly

Independence from New Zealand
  - Treaty of Berlin: 14 June 1889
  - Tripartite Convention: 16 February 1900
  - Colonisation by Germany: 1 March 1900
  - Occupied by New Zealand: 30 August 1914
  - League mandate: 17 December 1920
  - UN trusteeship: 13 December 1946
  - Western Samoa Act 1961: 1 January 1962

Area
  - Total: 2,831 km^{2} (1,093 sq mi) (167th)
  - Water (%): 0.3

Population
  - November 2021 census: 205,557 (176th)
  - Density: 70/km^{2} (181.3/sq mi)
- GDP (PPP): 2024 estimate
  - Total: ▲$1.225 billion
  - Per capita: $5,962
- GDP (nominal): 2024 estimate
  - Total: ▲$908.561 million
  - Per capita: $4,420
- Gini (2013): 38.7 medium inequality
- HDI (2023): ▲0.708 high (122nd)
- Currency: Tālā (WS$ (Note: Symbols SAT, ST or T are in use as well. The terms tālā and sene are translations of the English words dollar and cent in the Samoan language.)) (WST)
- Time zone: UTC+13 (Note: Since 31 December 2011) (WST)
- Date format: dd/mm/yyyy
- Calling code: +685
- ISO 3166 code: WS
- Internet TLD: .ws

Samoa, (Note: /ˈsɑːmɔːə/ SAH-maw-ə; US: /səˈmoʊə/ sə-MOH-ə; also UK: /sɑːˈmoʊə/ sah-MOH-ə; Samoan: Sāmoa, [ˈsaːmʊa]) officially the Independent State of Samoa, (Note: Samoan: Malo Saʻoloto Tutoʻatasi o Sāmoa) is an island country in Polynesia, a part of Oceania, which is in the South Pacific Ocean. It consists of two main islands (Savai'i and Upolu), two smaller, inhabited islands (Manono and Apolima), and several smaller, uninhabited islands, including the Aleipata Islands (Nuʻutele, Nuʻulua, Fanuatapu and Namua). Samoa is located 64 km (40 mi; 35 nmi) west of American Samoa, 889 km (552 mi; 480 nmi) northeast of Tonga, 1,152 km (716 mi; 622 nmi) northeast of Fiji, 483 km (300 mi; 261 nmi) east of Wallis and Futuna, 1,151 km (715 mi; 621 nmi) southeast of Tuvalu, 519 km (322 mi; 280 nmi) south of Tokelau, 4,190 km (2,600 mi; 2,260 nmi) southwest of Hawaii, and 610 km (380 mi; 330 nmi) northwest of Niue. The capital and largest city is Apia.

The Lapita people discovered and settled the Samoan Islands around 3,500 years ago. They developed a Samoan language and Samoan cultural identity. Because of the Samoans' seafaring skills, pre-20th-century European explorers referred to the entire island group, including American Samoa, as the "Navigator Islands". The country became a colony of the German Empire in 1899 after the Tripartite Convention, and was known as German Samoa. German administration ended in August 1914 after New Zealand troops bloodlessly occupied the colony at the start of World War I. New Zealand officially gained control of the region as a League of Nations mandate in 1920, when it became the Territory of Western Samoa. After being converted into a United Nations Trust Territory in 1946, Western Samoa gained independence on 1 January 1962 and officially returned to its original pre-occupation name Samoa on 4 July 1997.

Samoa is a unitary parliamentary democracy with 11 administrative divisions. It was admitted to the United Nations on 15 December 1976 and the country is also a member of the Commonwealth of Nations and the Pacific Islands Forum. The island's defence is the responsibility of the New Zealand Defence Force.

== Etymology ==
Samoa may come from Samoan: Sāmoa, lit. 'holy centre', uniting a compound of Samoan: sā, lit. 'sacred' and Samoan: moa, lit. 'middle'. The name is alternatively derived from a local chieftain named Samoa or an indigenous word meaning 'place of the chicken'.

From independence in 1962, the country was officially known as the Independent State of Western Samoa, (Note: Samoan: Malo Saʻoloto Tutoʻatasi o Sāmoa i Sisifo) commonly known as Western Samoa. (Note: Samoan: Sāmoa i Sisifo) The Western moniker was removed from the country's name on 4 July 1997, drawing protests from nearby American Samoa, although the former name remains in use, especially in their .ws top-domain.

== History ==
=== Geological history ===
The islands of Samoa were formed from the Miocene period. For the past 2 million years, the Samoan archipelago has experienced activity related to volcanic hotspots.

=== Early history ===
Samoa was discovered and settled by the Lapita people (Austronesian people who spoke Oceanic languages), who travelled from Island Melanesia. The earliest human remains found in Samoa are dated to between roughly 2,900 and 3,500 years ago. The remains were discovered at a Lapita site at Mulifanua, and the scientists' findings were published in 1974. The Samoans' origins have been studied in modern times through scientific research on Polynesian genetics, linguistics, and anthropology. However, while this research is ongoing, a number of theories have been proposed in the meantime. One theory is that the original Samoans were Austronesians who arrived during a final period of eastward expansion of the Lapita peoples out of Southeast Asia and Melanesia between 2,500 and 1,500 BCE.

Intimate sociocultural and genetic ties were maintained between Samoa, Fiji, and Tonga, and the archaeological record supports oral tradition and native genealogies that indicate interisland voyaging and intermarriage among precolonial Samoans, Fijians, and Tongans. Notable figures in Samoan history included the Tui Manu'a line, Queen Salamasina, King Fonoti and the four tama a ʻāiga: Malietoa, Tupua Tamasese, Mataʻafa, and Tuimalealiʻifano. Nafanua was a famous woman warrior who was deified in ancient Samoan religion and whose patronage was highly sought after by successive Samoan rulers.

Today, all of Samoa is united under its two principal royal families: the Sā Malietoa of the ancient Malietoa lineage that defeated the Tongans in the 13th century; and the Sā Tupua, Queen Salamasina's descendants and heirs who ruled Samoa in the centuries that followed her reign. Within these two principal lineages are the four highest titles of Samoa – the elder titles of Malietoa and Tupua Tamasese of antiquity and the newer Mataʻafa and Tuimalealiʻifano titles, which rose to prominence in 19th-century wars that preceded the colonial period. These four titles form the apex of the Samoan matai system as it stands today.

Contact with Europeans began in the early 18th century. Jacob Roggeveen, a Dutchman, was the first known non-Polynesian to sight the Samoan islands in 1722. This visit was followed by French explorer Louis Antoine de Bougainville, who named them the Navigator Islands in 1768. Contact was limited before the 1830s, which is when British missionaries of the London Missionary Society, whalers, and traders began arriving.

=== 19th century ===
Visits by American trading and whaling vessels were important in the early economic development of Samoa. The Salem brig Roscoe (Captain Benjamin Vanderford), in October 1821, was the first American trading vessel known to have called, and the Maro (Captain Richard Macy) of Nantucket, in 1824, was the first recorded United States whaler at Samoa. The whalers came for fresh drinking water, firewood, provisions, and, later, to recruit local men to serve as crewmen on their ships. The last recorded whaler visitor was the Governor Morton in 1870.

Christian missionary work in Samoa began in 1830 when John Williams of the London Missionary Society arrived in Sapapali'i from the Cook Islands and Tahiti. According to Barbara A. West, "The Samoans were also known to engage in 'headhunting', a ritual of war in which a warrior took the head of his slain opponent to give to his leader, thus proving his bravery."

In A Footnote to History: Eight Years of Trouble in Samoa (1892), Robert Louis Stevenson details the activities of the great powers battling for influence in Samoa – the United States, Germany and Britain – and the political machinations of the various Samoan factions within their indigenous political system. Even as they descended into ever greater interclan warfare, what most alarmed Stevenson was the Samoans' economic innocence. In 1894, just months before his death, he addressed the island chiefs:

There is but one way to defend Samoa. Hear it before it is too late. It is to make roads and gardens, and care for your trees, and sell their produce wisely, and, in one word, to occupy and use your country ... if you do not occupy and use your country, others will. It will not continue to be yours or your children's, if you occupy it for nothing. You and your children will, in that case, be cast out into outer darkness.

He had "seen these judgments of God" in Hawaii, where abandoned native churches stood like tombstones "over a grave, in the midst of the white men's sugar fields".

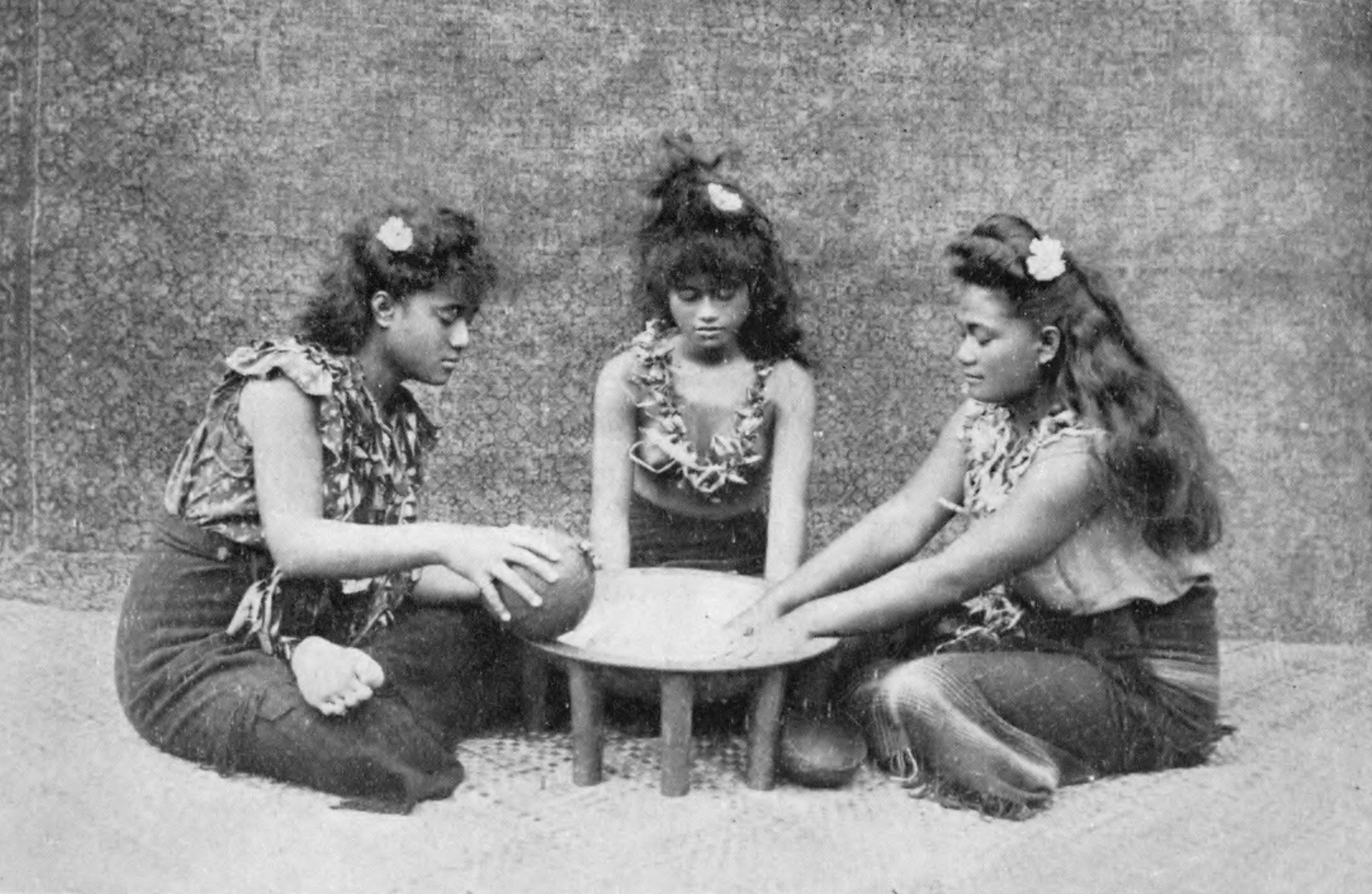
Studio photo depicting preparation of the Samoa 'ava ceremony c. 1911

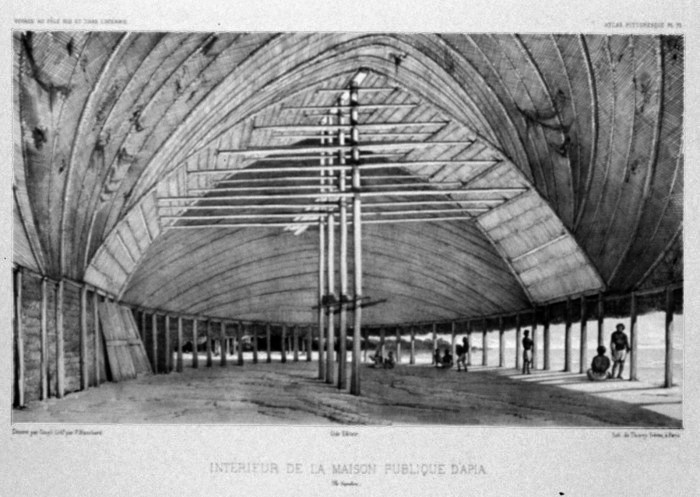
Interior of Samoan house, Apia, Urville 1842

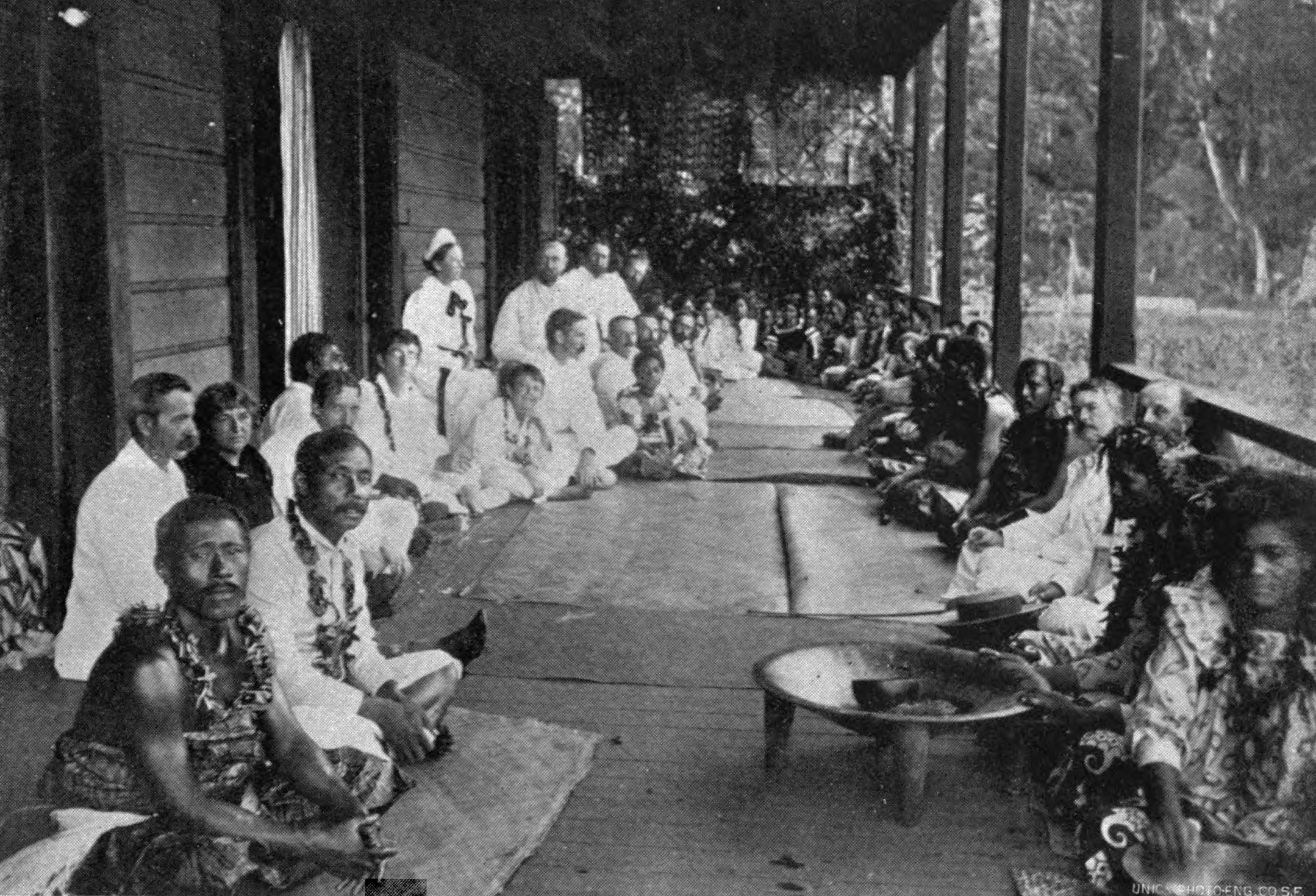
Robert Louis Stevenson's birthday fete at Vailima, 1894

The Germans, in particular, began to show great commercial interest in the Samoan Islands, especially on the island of Upolu, where German firms monopolised copra and cocoa bean processing. The United States laid its own claim, based on commercial shipping interests in Pearl Harbor in Hawaii and Pago Pago Bay in eastern Samoa, and forced alliances, most conspicuously on the islands of Tutuila and Manu'a, which became American Samoa.

Britain also sent troops to protect British business interests, harbour rights, and the consulate. This was followed by an eight-year civil war, during which each of the three powers supplied arms, training, and, in some cases, combat troops to the warring Samoan parties. The Samoan crisis reached a critical juncture in March 1889, when all three colonial contenders sent warships into Apia harbour, and a large-scale war seemed imminent. A massive storm on 15 March 1889 damaged or destroyed the warships, ending the military conflict.

The Second Samoan Civil War reached a head in 1898 when Germany, the United Kingdom, and the United States were locked in dispute over who should control the Samoan Islands. The Siege of Apia occurred in March 1899. Samoan forces loyal to Prince Tanu were besieged by a larger force of Samoan rebels loyal to Mataʻafa Iosefo. Supporting Prince Tanu were landing parties from four British and American warships. After several days of fighting, the Samoan rebels were finally defeated.

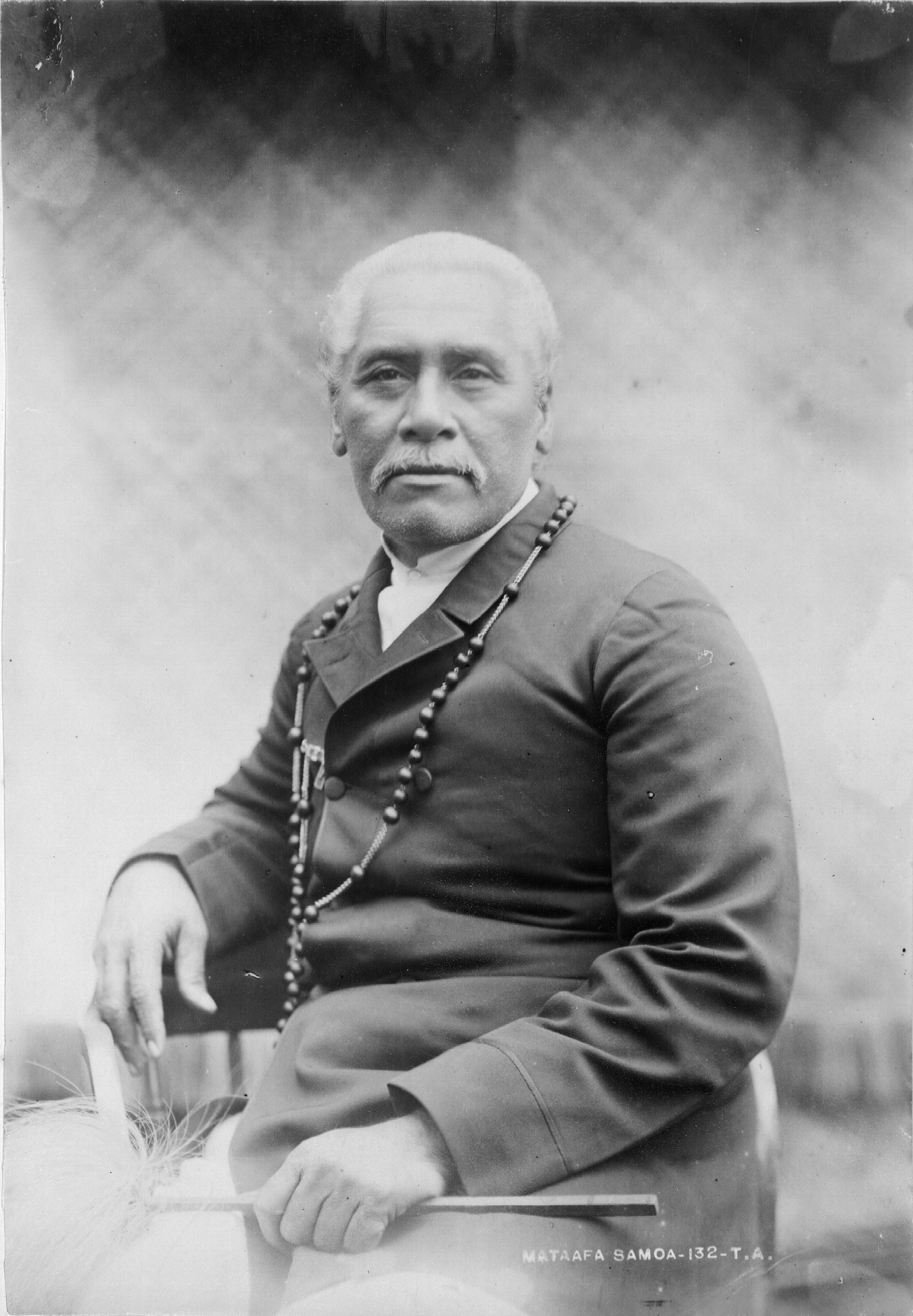
Mataʻafa Iosefo (1832–1912), paramount chief and rival for the kingship of Samoa

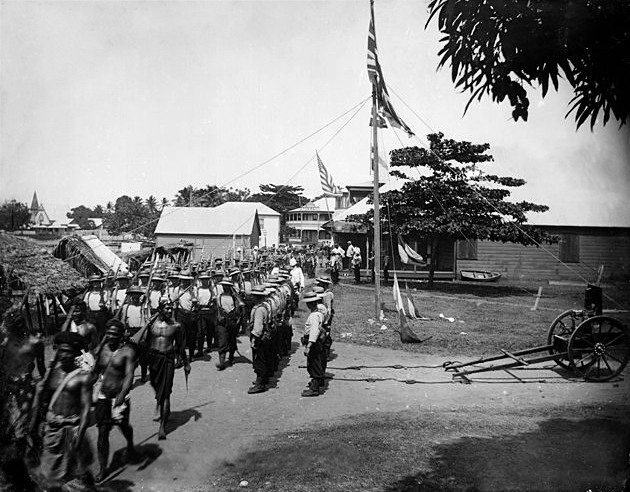
The joint commission of Germany, the United States and Great Britain abolished the Samoan kingship in June 1899.

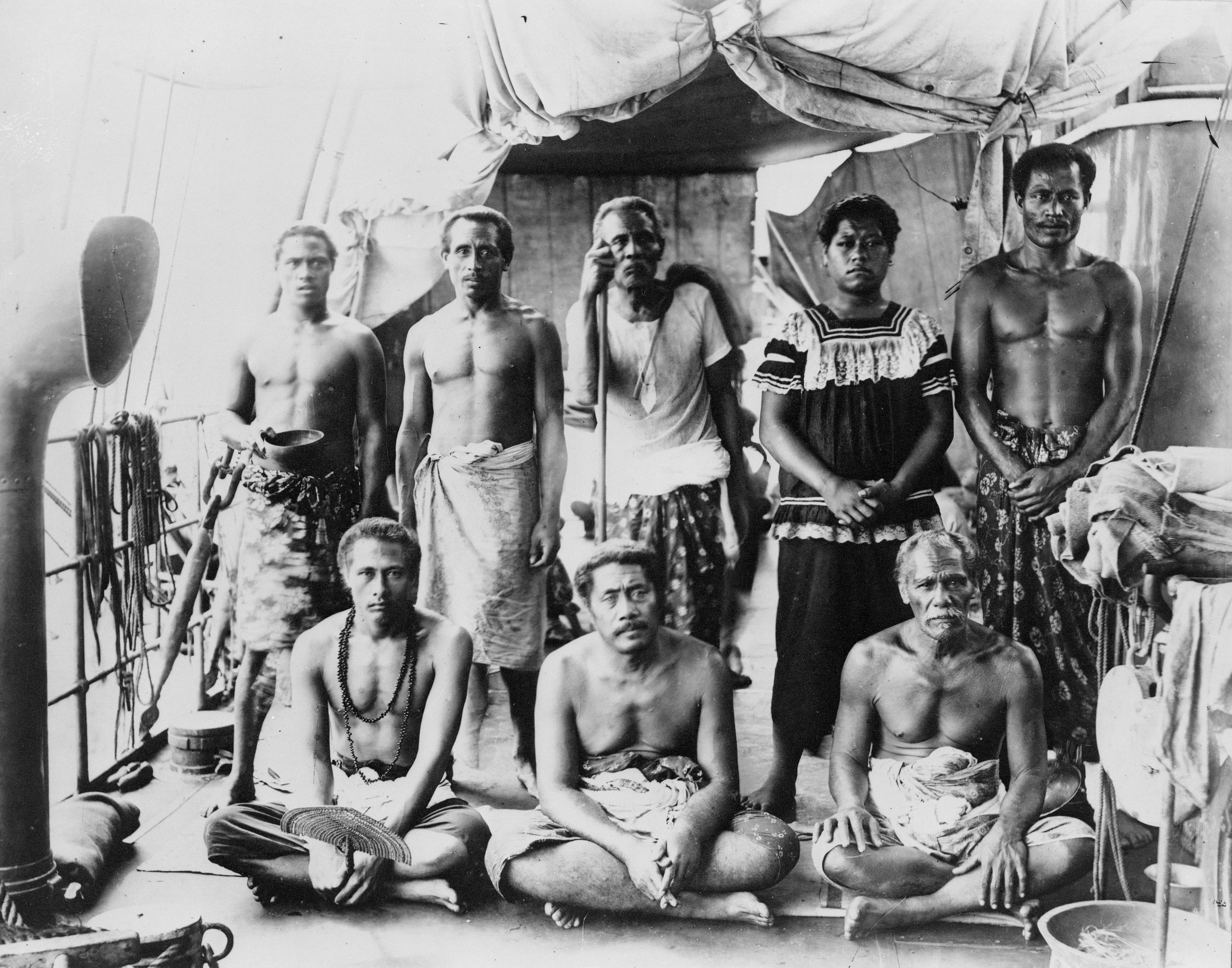
Exiled orator Lauaki Namulauʻulu Mamoe (standing third from left with said orator's staff) and other chiefs aboard German warship taking them to exile in Saipan, 1909

American and British warships shelled Apia on 15 March 1899, including the USS Philadelphia. Germany, the United Kingdom, and the United States quickly resolved to end the hostilities and divided the island chain under the Tripartite Convention of 1899, signed in Washington on 2 December 1899, with ratifications exchanged on 16 February 1900.

The eastern island group became a territory of the United States (the Tutuila Islands in 1900 and officially Manu'a in 1904) and was known as American Samoa. The western islands, by far the greater landmass, became German Samoa. The United Kingdom had vacated all claims in Samoa and in return received (1) termination of German rights in Tonga, (2) all of the Solomon Islands south of Bougainville, and (3) territorial alignments in West Africa.

=== German Samoa (1900–1914) ===
Chiefs from all around Samoa mourning the 1929 death of Mau Movement leader, Tupua Tamesese Lealofi III, after the Black Saturday killings by NZ soldiers

The German Empire governed the western part of the Samoan archipelago from 1900 to 1914. Wilhelm Solf was appointed the colony's first governor. In 1908, when the non-violent Mau a Pule resistance movement arose, Solf did not hesitate to banish the Mau leader Lauaki Namulau'ulu Mamoe to Saipan in the German Northern Mariana Islands.

The German colonial administration governed on the principle that "there was only one government in the islands." Thus, there was no Samoan Tupu (king), nor an alii sili (similar to a governor), but two Fautua (advisors) were appointed by the colonial government. Tumua and Pule (traditional governments of Upolu and Savai'i) were for a time silent; all decisions on matters affecting lands and titles were under the control of the colonial Governor.

In the first month of World War I, on 29 August 1914, troops of the New Zealand Expeditionary Force landed unopposed on Upolu and seized control from the German authorities, following a request by Great Britain for New Zealand to perform this "great and urgent imperial service."

=== New Zealand rule (1914–1961) ===
From the end of World War I until 1962, New Zealand controlled Western Samoa as a Class C Mandate under trusteeship through the League of Nations, then through the United Nations. Between 1919 and 1962, Samoa was administered by the Department of External Affairs, a government department which had been specially created to oversee New Zealand's Island Territories and Samoa. In 1943, this department was renamed the Department of Island Territories after a separate Department of External Affairs was created to conduct New Zealand's foreign affairs. During the period of New Zealand control, their administrators were responsible for two major incidents.

==== Flu pandemic ====
In the first incident, approximately one fifth of the Samoan population died in the influenza epidemic of 1918–1919.

In 1918, during the final stages of World War I, the Spanish flu had taken its toll, spreading rapidly from country to country. On Samoa, there had been no epidemic of pneumonic influenza in Western Samoa before the arrival of the SS Talune from Auckland on 7 November 1918. The NZ administration allowed the ship to berth in breach of quarantine; within seven days of this ship's arrival, influenza became epidemic in Upolu and then spread rapidly throughout the rest of the territory. Samoa suffered the most of all Pacific islands, with 90% of the population infected; 30% of adult men, 22% of adult women and 10% of children died. The cause of the epidemic was confirmed in 1919 by a Royal Commission of Inquiry into the Epidemic concluded that there had been no epidemic of pneumonic influenza in Western Samoa before the arrival of the Talune from Auckland on 7 November 1918.

The pandemic undermined Samoan confidence in New Zealand's administrative capacity and competence. Some Samoans asked that the rule of the islands be transferred to the Americans or the British.

==== Mau movement ====
The second major incident arose out of an initially peaceful protest by the Mau (which translates as "strongly held opinion"), a non-violent popular pro-independence movement which had its beginnings in the early 1900s on Savai'i, led by Lauaki Namulauulu Mamoe, an orator chief deposed by Solf. In 1909, Lauaki was exiled to Saipan and died en route back to Samoa in 1915.

By 1918, Western Samoa had a population of some 38,000 Samoans and 1,500 Europeans.

However, native Samoans greatly resented New Zealand's colonial rule, and blamed inflation and the catastrophic 1918 flu epidemic on its misrule. By the late 1920s the resistance movement against colonial rule had gathered widespread support. One of the Mau leaders was Olaf Frederick Nelson, a half Samoan and half Swedish merchant. Nelson was eventually exiled during the late 1920s and early 1930s, but he continued to assist the organisation financially and politically. In accordance with the Mau's non-violent philosophy, the newly elected leader, High Chief Tupua Tamasese Lealofi, led his fellow uniformed Mau in a peaceful demonstration in downtown Apia on 28 December 1929.

The New Zealand police attempted to arrest one of the leaders in the demonstration. When he resisted, a struggle developed between the police and the Mau. The officers began to fire randomly into the crowd and used a Lewis machine gun, mounted in preparation for the demonstration, to disperse the demonstrators. Mau leader and paramount chief Tupua Tamasese Lealofi III was shot from behind and killed while trying to bring calm and order to the Mau demonstrators. Ten others died that day and approximately 50 were injured by gunshot wounds and police batons. That day would come to be known in Samoa as Black Saturday.

On 13 January 1930, the New Zealand authorities banned the organisation. As many as 1500 Mau men took to the bush, pursued by an armed force of 150 marines and seamen from the light cruiser HMS Dunedin, and 50 military police. They were supported by a seaplane flown by Flight Lieutenant Sidney Wallingford of the New Zealand Permanent Air Force. Villages were raided, often at night and with fixed bayonets. In March, through the mediation of local Europeans and missionaries, Mau leaders met New Zealand's Minister of Defence and agreed to disperse.

Supporters of the Mau continued to be arrested, so women came to the fore rallying supporters and staging demonstrations. The political stalemate was broken following the victory of the Labour Party in New Zealand's 1935 general election. A 'goodwill mission' to Apia in June 1936 recognised the Mau as a legitimate political organisation, and Olaf Nelson was allowed to return from exile. In September 1936, Samoans exercised for the first time the right to elect the members of the advisory Fono of Faipule, with representatives of the Mau movement winning 31 of the 39 seats.

=== Independence ===
After repeated efforts by the Samoan independence movement, the New Zealand Western Samoa Act of 24 November 1961 terminated the Trusteeship Agreement and granted the country independence as the Independent State of Western Samoa, effective 1 January 1962. Western Samoa, the first small-island country in the Pacific to become independent, signed a Treaty of Friendship with New Zealand later in 1962. Western Samoa joined the Commonwealth of Nations on 28 August 1970. While independence was achieved at the beginning of January, Samoa annually celebrates 1 June as its independence day.

At the time of independence, Fiamē Mataʻafa Faumuina Mulinuʻu II, one of the four highest-ranking paramount chiefs in the country, became Samoa's first prime minister. Another paramount chief, Tuiaana Tuimalealiʻifano Suatipatipa II, was admitted to the Council of Deputies; the remaining two – Tupua Tamasese Meaʻole and Malietoa Tanumafili II – became joint heads of state for life.

On 15 December 1976, Western Samoa was admitted to the United Nations as the 147th member state. It asked to be referred to in the United Nations as the Independent State of Samoa.

Travel writer Paul Theroux noted marked differences between the societies in Western Samoa and American Samoa in 1992.

Western Samoa had signed the UN Convention on the Law of the Sea on 28 September 1984, so indicating its intentions, and ratified it on 14 August 1995, making the island nation a party in efforts to manage marine resources and protect its vast regional ocean territory. The convention entered into force for Western Samoa on 13 September 1995.

On 4 July 1997, the government amended the constitution to change the name of the country from Western Samoa to Samoa, the name it had been called by in the United Nations since it joined. American Samoa protested against the name change, asserting that it diminished its own identity.

In 2002, New Zealand prime minister Helen Clark formally apologised for New Zealand's role in the Spanish influenza outbreak in 1918 that killed over a quarter of Samoa's population and for the Black Saturday killings in 1929.

On 7 September 2009, the government changed the rule of the road from right to left, in common with most other Commonwealth countries – most notably countries in the region such as Australia and New Zealand, home to large numbers of Samoans. This made Samoa the first country in the 21st century to switch to driving on the left.

At the end of December 2011, Samoa changed its time zone offset from UTC−11 to UTC+13, effectively jumping forward by one day, omitting Friday, 30 December from the local calendar. This also changed the shape of the International Date Line, moving it to the east of the territory. This change aimed to help the nation boost its economy in doing business with Australia and New Zealand. Before this change, Samoa was 21 hours behind Sydney, but the change means it is now three hours ahead. The previous time zone, implemented on 4 July 1892, operated in line with American traders based in California. In October 2021, Samoa ceased daylight saving time.

In 2017, Samoa signed the UN treaty on the Prohibition of Nuclear Weapons.

In June 2017, Parliament amended Article 1 of the Samoan Constitution to make Christianity the state religion.

In May 2021, Fiamē Naomi Mataʻafa became Samoa's first female prime minister. Mataʻafa's FAST party narrowly won the election, ending the rule of long-term Prime Minister Tuilaʻepa Saʻilele Malielegaoi of the Human Rights Protection Party (HRPP), although the constitutional crisis complicated and delayed this. On 24 May 2021, she was sworn in as the new prime minister, though it was not until July that the Supreme Court ruled that her swearing-in was legal, thus ending the constitutional crisis and bringing an end to Tuilaʻepa's 22-year premiership. The FAST party's success in the 2021 election and subsequent court rulings also ended nearly four decades of HRPP rule. In 2025, after Mataʻafa dismissed FAST leader and agriculture minister Laʻauli Leuatea Schmidt over corruption charges, she was in turn expelled from FAST. After FAST, led by Schmidt, won the ensuing snap election, he replaced Mataʻafa as prime minister.

== Government and politics ==
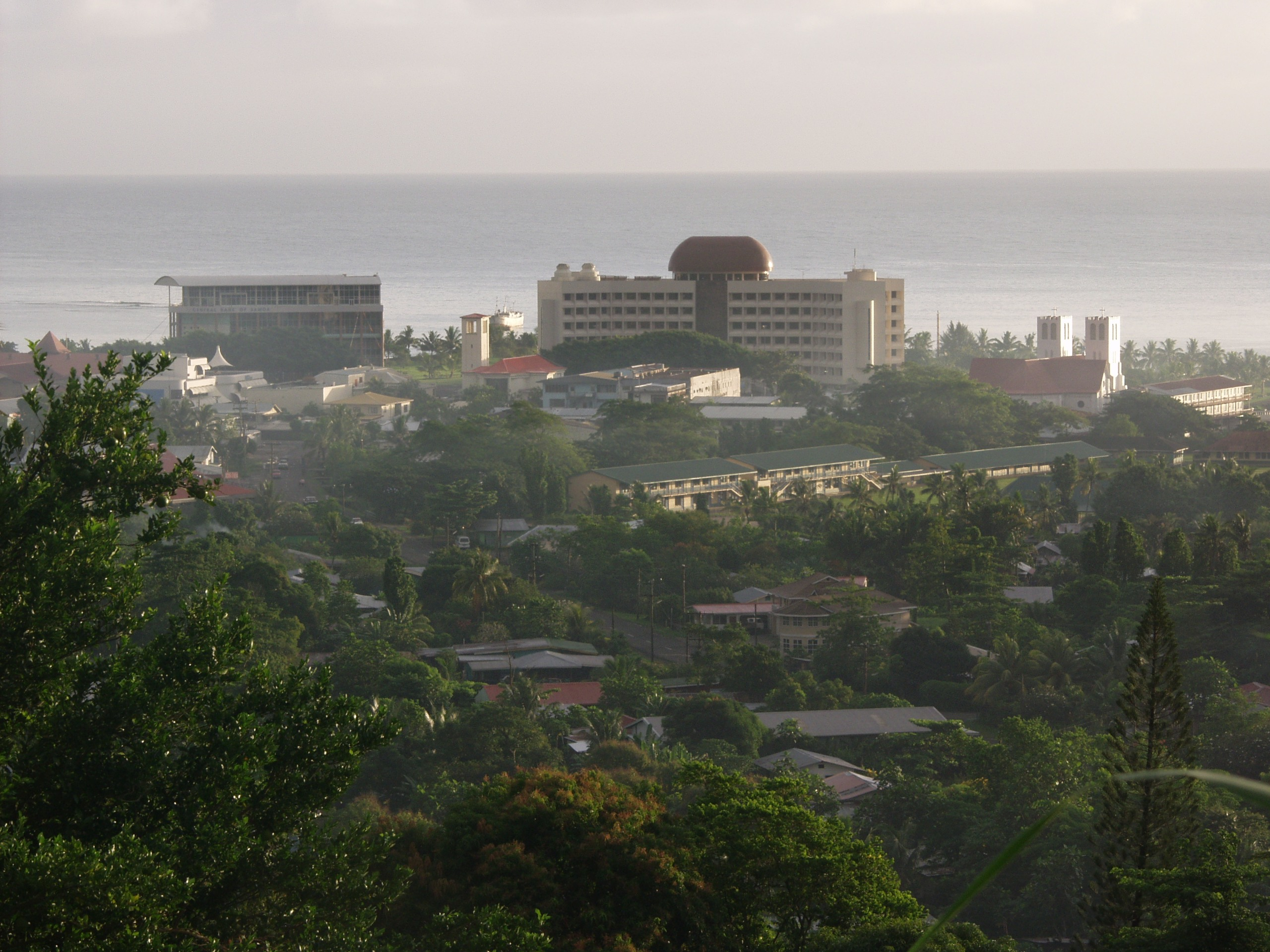
Government buildings in Apia

The 1960 constitution, which formally came into force with independence from New Zealand in 1962, builds on the British pattern of parliamentary democracy, modified to take account of Samoan customs. The national modern Government of Samoa is referred to as the Malo.

The head of state of Samoa is known as the O le Ao o le Malo in Samoan, and since its establishment only paramount chiefs have held the office. The current head of state is Tuimalealiʻifano Vaʻaletoʻa Sualauvi II, who was elected by the legislature in 2017 and again in 2022.

The Legislative Assembly or Fono is the unicameral legislature, consisting of 51 members serving five year terms. Forty-nine are matai title-holders elected from territorial districts by Samoans; the other two are chosen by non-Samoans with no chiefly affiliation on separate electoral rolls. At least ten per cent of the MPs must be women. Universal suffrage was adopted in 1990, but only chiefs (matai) may stand for election to the Samoan seats. There are more than 25,000 matais in the country, about five per cent of whom are women. The prime minister, chosen by a majority in the assembly, is appointed by the head of state to form a government. The prime minister's choices for the 12 cabinet positions are appointed by the head of state, subject to the continuing confidence of the legislative assembly. Since 2025, Laʻauli Leuatea Schmidt has served as prime minister, while Auapaʻau Mulipola Aloitafua has been speaker of the Legislative Assembly.

Prominent women in Samoan politics include the late Laʻulu Fetauimalemau Mataʻafa (1928–2007) from Lotofaga constituency, the wife of Samoa's first prime minister. Their daughter Fiamē Naomi Mataʻafa is a matai and a long-serving senior member of cabinet, who was elected Prime Minister in 2021. Other women in politics include Samoan scholar and eminent professor Aiono Fanaafi Le Tagaloa, orator-chief Matatumua Maimoana and Safuneituʻuga Paʻaga Neri (former Minister of Communication and Technology).

The judicial system incorporates English common law and local customs. The Supreme Court of Samoa is the court of highest jurisdiction. The Chief Justice of Samoa is appointed by the head of state upon the recommendation of the prime minister.

=== Administrative divisions ===
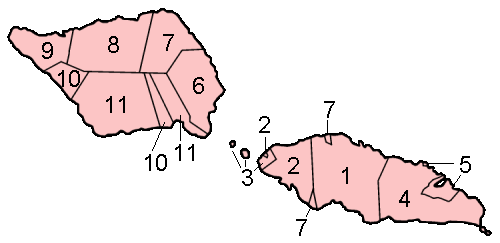
Political districts of Samoa, including minor islands

Samoa comprises eleven itūmālō (political districts). These are the traditional eleven districts which predate European arrival. Each district has its own constitutional foundation (faʻavae) based on the traditional order of title precedence found in each district's faalupega (traditional salutations). The capital village of each district administers and coordinates the affairs of the district and confers each district's paramount title, amongst other responsibilities.

For example:

- Aʻana has its capital at Leulumoega. The paramount tama a 'āiga (royal lineage) title of Aʻana is Tuimalealiʻifano. The paramount pāpā title of Aʻana is the Tui Aʻana. The orator group which confers this title — the Faleiva (House of Nine) — is based at Leulumoega.
- Ātua has its capital at Lufilufi. The paramount tama a ʻāiga (royal lineage) titles of Ātua are Tupua Tamasese (based in Falefa and Salani) and Mataʻafa (based in Amaile and Lotofaga). The two main political families who confer the respective titles are ʻAiga Sā Fenunuivao and ʻAiga Sā Levālasi. The paramount pāpā title of Ātua is the Tui Ātua. The orator group which confers this title — the Faleono (House of Six) — is based at Lufilufi.
- Tuamasaga has its capital at Afega. The paramount tama a ʻāiga (royal lineage) title of Tuamasaga is the Malietoa title, based in Malie. The main political family that confers the Malietoa title is ʻAiga Sā Malietoa, with Auimatagi as the main speaker for the family. The paramount pāpā titles of Tuamasaga are Gatoaitele (conferred by Afega) and Vaetamasoalii (conferred by Safata).

The eleven itūmālō are identified to be:

On Upolu

1. Tuamasaga (Afega)^{1}
2. Aʻana (Leulumoega)
3. Aiga-i-le-Tai (Mulifanua)^{2}
4. Atua (Lufilufi)^{3}
5. Vaʻa-o-Fonoti (Samamea)

On Savaiʻi

6. Faʻasaleleaga (Safotulafai)
7. Gagaʻemauga (Saleaula)^{4}
8. Gagaʻifomauga (Safotu)
9. Vaisigano (Asau)
10. Satupaʻitea (Satupaʻitea)
11. Palauli (Vailoa)

^{1} including the faipule district of Siumu
^{2} including islands Manono, Apolima and Nuʻulopa
^{3} including the Aleipata Islands and Nuʻusafeʻe Island
^{4} smaller parts also on Upolu (Salamumu, incl. Salamumu-Uta and Leauvaʻa villages)

=== Human rights ===
Major areas of concern include the under-representation of women, domestic violence and poor prison conditions. Homosexual acts are illegal in Samoa.

=== State religion ===
In June 2017, an Act was passed changing the country's constitution to include a reference to the Trinity. As amended, Article 1 of the Samoan Constitution states that "Samoa is a Christian nation founded on God the Father, the Son and the Holy Spirit". According to The Diplomat, "What Samoa has done is shift references to Christianity into the body of the constitution, giving the text far more potential to be used in legal processes." The preamble to the constitution already described the country as "an independent State based on Christian principles and Samoan custom and traditions."

=== Military and police ===
Samoa has no formal defence structure or regular armed forces. It has informal defence ties with New Zealand, which is required to consider any request for assistance from Samoa under the bilateral Treaty of Friendship of 1962.

Officers of the national police force, the Samoa Police Service, are regularly unarmed, but may be armed in exceptional circumstances with ministerial approval. As of 2022 there are between 900 and 1,100 police officers in Samoa.

== Geography ==
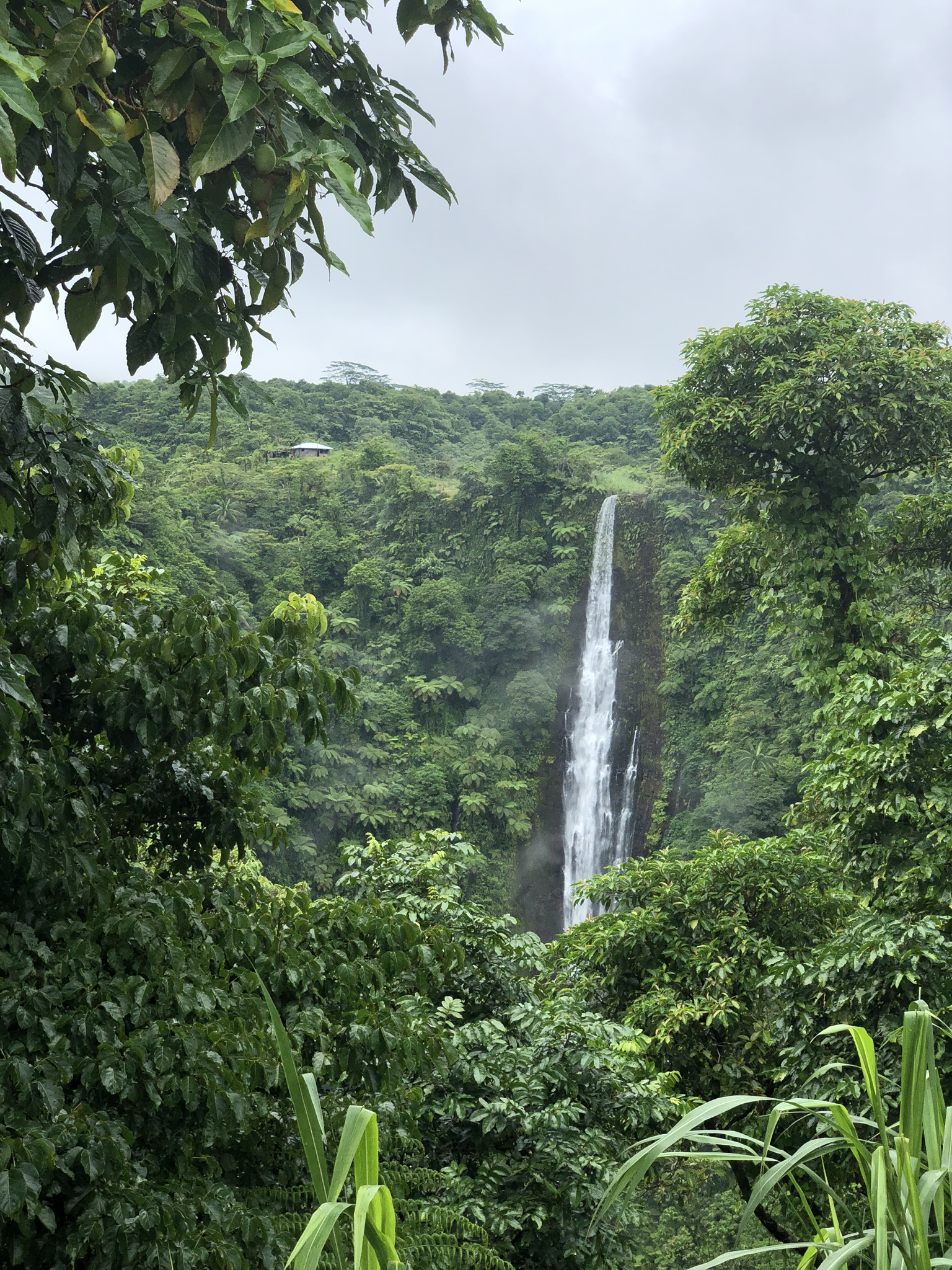
Samoan waterfall

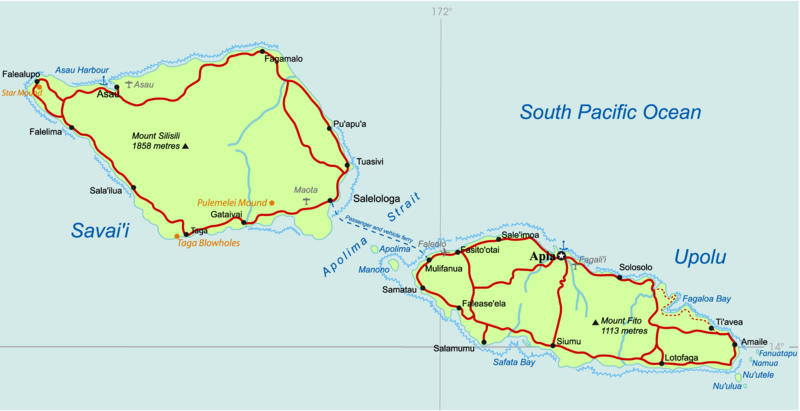
A map of Samoa

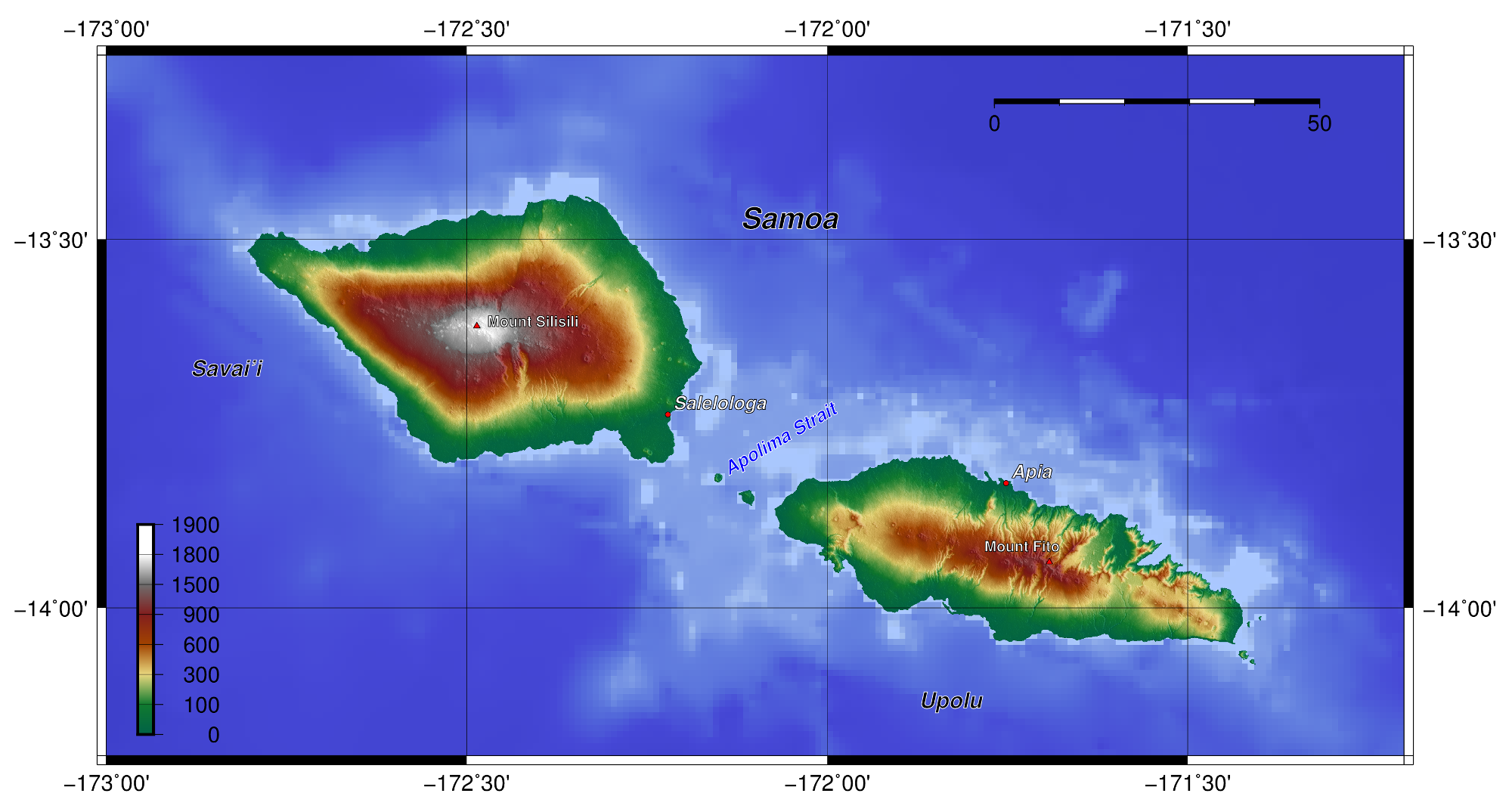
Topography of Samoa

Samoa lies south of the equator, about halfway between Hawaii and New Zealand, in the Polynesian region of the Pacific Ocean. The total land area is 2,842 km^{2} (1,097 sq mi), consisting of the two large islands of Upolu and Savaiʻi (which together account for 99% of the total land area) and eight small islets.

The islets are:

- the three islets in the Apolima Strait (Manono Island, Apolima and Nuʻulopa)
- the four Aleipata Islands off the eastern end of Upolu (Nuʻutele, Nuʻulua, Namua, and Fanuatapu)
- Nuʻusafeʻe, which is less than 1 ha (2 1/2 acres) in area and lies about 1.4 km (0.87 mi; 0.76 nmi) off the south coast of Upolu at the village of Vaovai

The main island of Upolu is home to nearly three-quarters of Samoa's population, and to the capital city, Apia.

The Samoan Islands result geologically from volcanism originating from the Samoa hotspot, which is probably driven by a mantle plume. While all of the islands have volcanic origins, only Savaiʻi, the westernmost island in Samoa, remains volcanically active, with the most recent eruptions at Mount Matavanu (1905–1911), Mata o le Afi (1902) and Mauga Afi (1725). The highest point in Samoa is Mount Silisili, at 1,858 m (6,096 ft). The Saleaula lava fields situated on the central north coast of Savaiʻi result from the Mount Matavanu eruptions, which left 50 km^{2} (19 sq mi) of solidified lava.

Savaiʻi is the largest of the Samoan islands and the sixth-largest Polynesian island (after New Zealand's North, South and Stewart Islands and the Hawaiian islands of Hawaiʻi and Maui). The population of Savaiʻi is roughly 42 thousand people.

=== Climate ===
Samoa has an equatorial climate. The average annual temperature is 26.5 °C (79.7 °F), and a main rainy season from November to April, although heavy rain may fall in any month.

Climate data for Apia
| Month | Jan | Feb | Mar | Apr | May | Jun | Jul | Aug | Sep | Oct | Nov | Dec | Year |
|---|---|---|---|---|---|---|---|---|---|---|---|---|---|
| Mean daily maximum °C (°F) | 30.4 (86.7) | 30.6 (87.1) | 30.6 (87.1) | 30.7 (87.3) | 30.4 (86.7) | 30.0 (86.0) | 29.5 (85.1) | 29.6 (85.3) | 29.9 (85.8) | 30.1 (86.2) | 30.3 (86.5) | 30.5 (86.9) | 30.2 (86.4) |
| Mean daily minimum °C (°F) | 23.9 (75.0) | 24.2 (75.6) | 24.0 (75.2) | 23.8 (74.8) | 23.4 (74.1) | 23.2 (73.8) | 22.6 (72.7) | 22.8 (73.0) | 23.1 (73.6) | 23.4 (74.1) | 23.6 (74.5) | 23.8 (74.8) | 23.5 (74.3) |
| Average rainfall mm (inches) | 489.0 (19.25) | 368.0 (14.49) | 352.1 (13.86) | 211.2 (8.31) | 192.6 (7.58) | 120.8 (4.76) | 120.7 (4.75) | 113.2 (4.46) | 153.9 (6.06) | 224.3 (8.83) | 261.7 (10.30) | 357.5 (14.07) | 2,965 (116.72) |
Source: World Meteorological Organization (UN)

=== Ecology ===
Samoa forms part of the Samoan tropical moist forests ecoregion. Since human habitation began, about 80% of the lowland rainforests have disappeared. However, with recent reforestation, about 60.4% (171,000 ha) of Samoa is forested, of which 32,000 ha is planted forest.

Within the ecoregion, about 28% of plants and 84% of land birds are endemic.

In June 2025, Samoa legally adopted the Samoa Marine Spatial Plan, a marine spatial planning framework that applies across Samoa's exclusive economic zone and uses ocean zoning to designate fully protected marine protected areas alongside zones intended for managed use. The adoption included nine new fully protected marine protected areas covering 36,000 km^{2} (14,000 sq mi). Stakeholder consultations during the marine spatial planning process included partners such as Conservation International Samoa.

== Economy ==
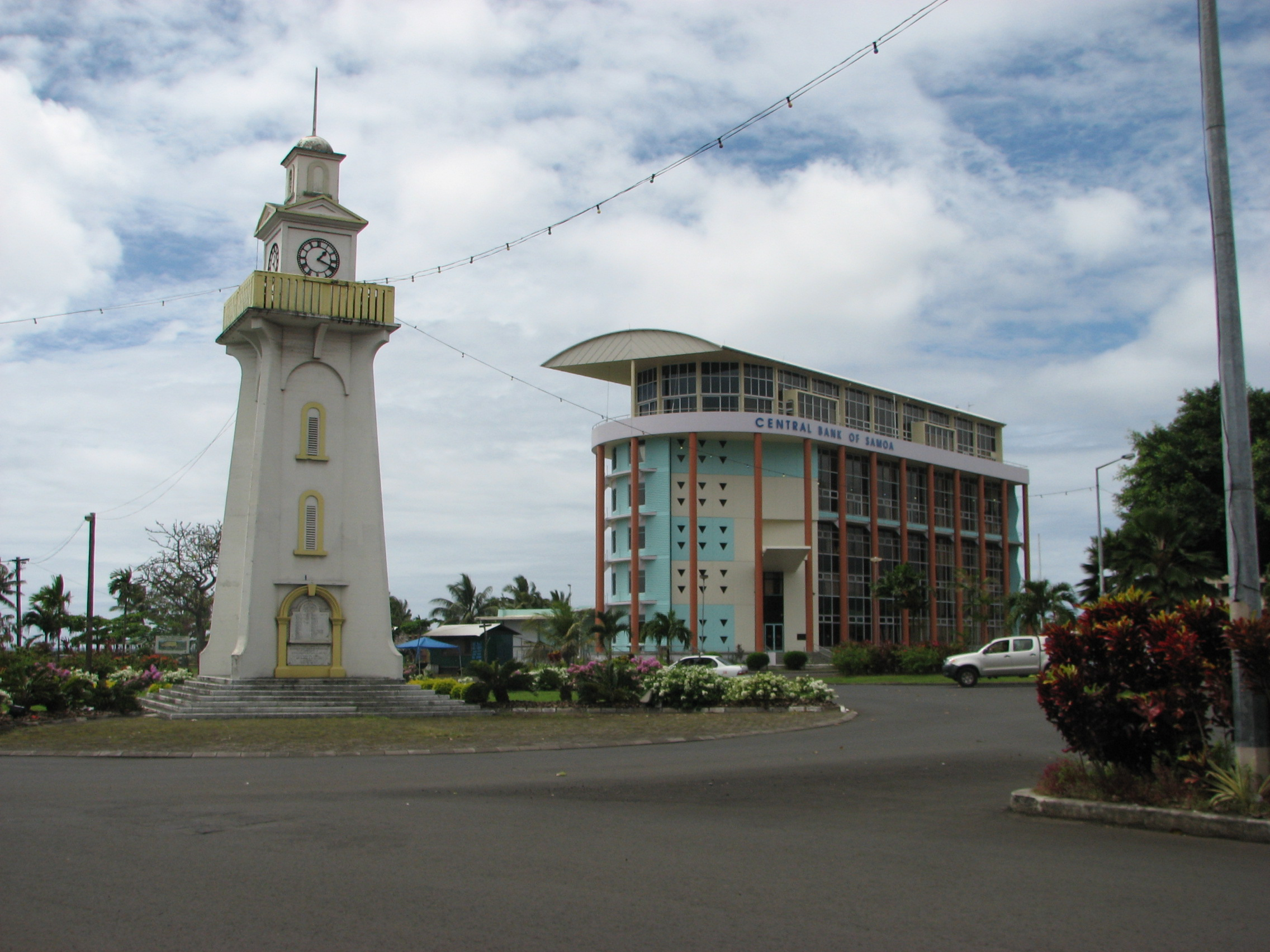
Central Bank of Samoa

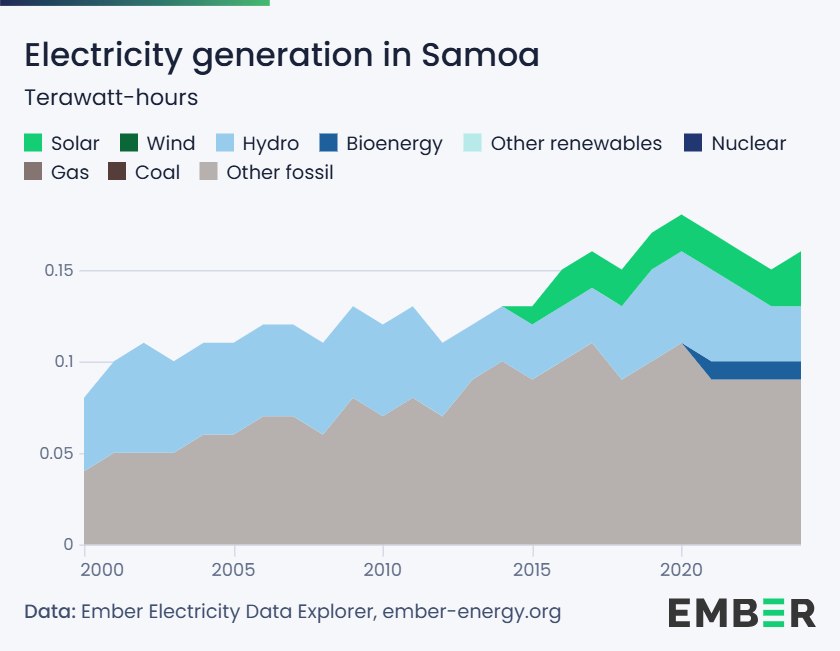
Electricity generation in Samoa in terawatt-hours

The United Nations has classified Samoa as an economically developing country since 2014. As of 2017 Samoa's gross domestic product in purchasing-power parity was estimated at $1.13 billion U.S. dollars, ranking the country 204th in the world. The services sector accounted for 66% of GDP, followed by industry and agriculture at 23.6% and 10.4% respectively. For the same year, the Samoan labour force was estimated at 50,700.

The Central Bank of Samoa issues and regulates Samoa's currency, the Samoan tālā. The economy of Samoa has traditionally depended on agriculture and fishing at the local level. In modern times, development aid, private family remittances from overseas, and agricultural exports have become key factors in the nation's economy. Agriculture employs two-thirds of the labour force and furnishes 90% of exports, featuring coconut cream, coconut oil, noni (juice of the nonu fruit, as it is known in Samoan), and copra.

Sixty percent of Samoa's electricity comes from renewable hydro, solar, and wind sources, with the remainder produced by diesel generators. The Electric Power Corporation set a goal of 100% renewable energy by 2021.

=== Tourism ===
Tourist arrivals of 2024 in %

In 2024 about 200,000 tourists visited the country. As of 2024 tourism makes up around 20% of Samoa's GDP, a decrease from 24.5% in 2019. The sector is volatile, affected by pandemics such as the 2019 measles outbreak and COVID-19 and by natural disasters such as cyclones and the 2009 tsunami. The biggest sources of international tourists are New Zealand, Australia and the United States. In 2019, 38% of international arrivals were holidaymakers and 37% were visiting friends and family. The peak season is from June to September during the drier Samoan winter, with another peak during December and January, coinciding with the summer school holiday break in New Zealand and Australia, when Samoans living overseas return to visit their families for Christmas. Samoa is not as important a destination for cruise ships as some other Pacific Islands, but the Samoan government sees potential in expanding this sector of the tourism market.

Samoa markets itself internationally as 'Beautiful Samoa.' and promotes key attractions that include diving and snorkeling and unique features such as blowholes, lava fields and the To Sua ocean trench, a sinkhole and swimming hole. A 2013 report stated that the most popular activities for holidaymakers to Samoa are swimming or visiting beaches, relaxing, visiting cafes and restaurants, shopping and sightseeing. The most popular attractions for holidaymakers were Lalomanu and Saleapaga beaches, To Sua Trench, Piula Cave Pool, Papaseea sliding rocks, Saleaula lava fields and Robert Louis Stevenson’s villa and grave.

=== Agriculture ===
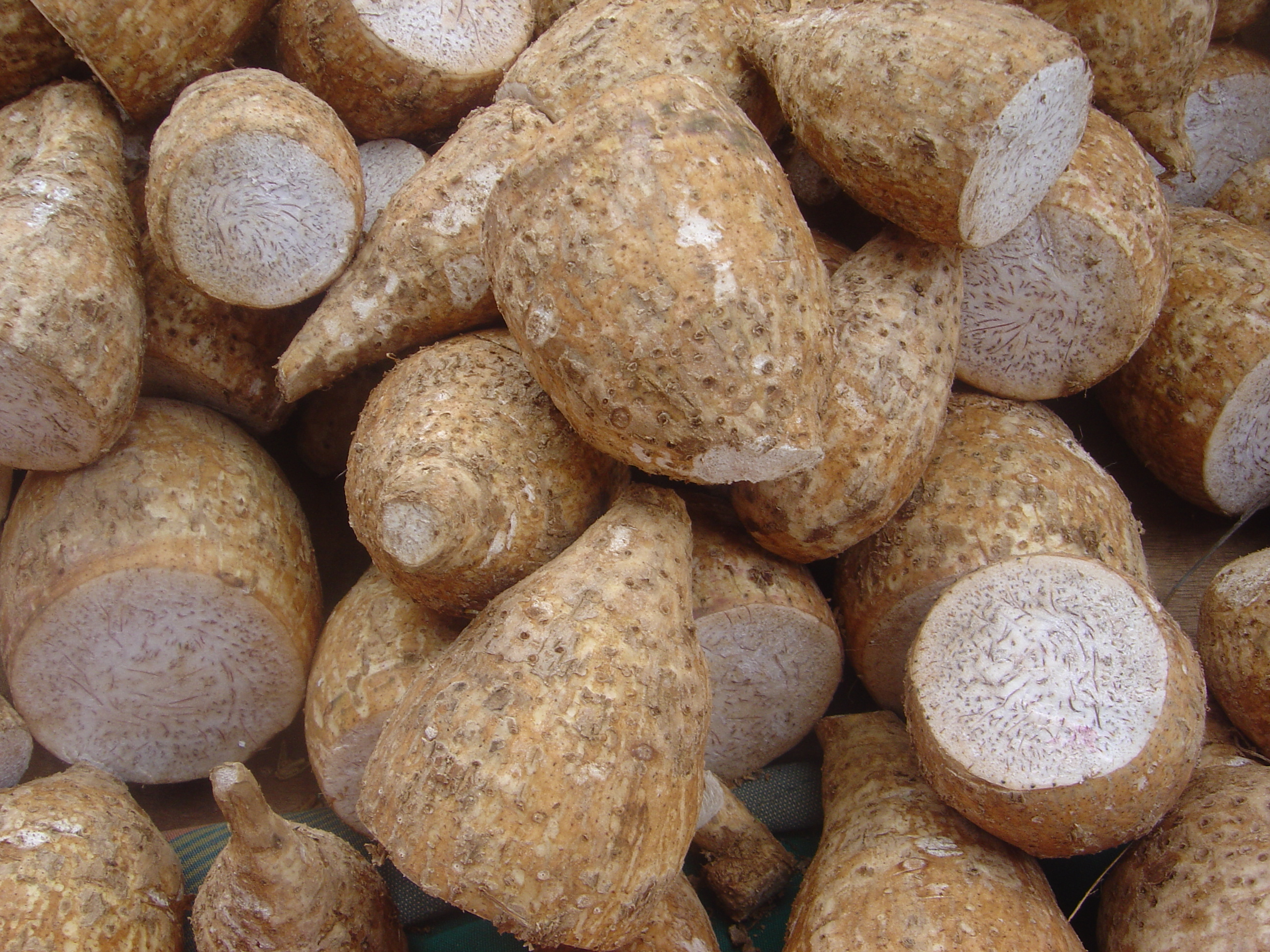
Taro, a root crop, traditionally was Samoa's largest export, generating more than half of all export revenue in 1993. A fungal blight devastated the plants, and in each year since 1994 taro exports have accounted for less than 1% of export revenue.

In the period before German colonisation (from the late 19th century), Samoa produced mostly copra. German merchants and settlers were active in introducing large-scale plantation operations and in developing new industries, notably cocoa beans and rubber, relying on imported labourers from China and Melanesia. When the value of natural rubber fell drastically, about the end of World War I in 1918, the New Zealand government encouraged the production of bananas, for which there is a large market in New Zealand.

Because of variations in altitude, Samoa can cultivate a large range of tropical and subtropical crops. Land is not generally available to outside interests. Of the total land area of 2,934 km^{2} (725,000 acres), about 24.4% is in permanent crops and another 21.2% is arable. About 4.4% is Western Samoan Trust Estates Corporation (WSTEC).

The staple products of Samoa are copra (dried coconut meat), cocoa beans (for chocolate), rubber, and bananas. The annual production of both bananas and copra has been in the range of 13,000–15,000 tonnes (14,000–17,000 tons). If the coconut rhinoceros beetle in Samoa were eradicated, Samoa could produce in excess of 40,000 tonnes (44,000 tons) of copra. Samoan cocoa beans are of very high quality and are used in fine New Zealand chocolates. Most are Criollo-Forastero hybrids. Coffee grows well, but production has been uneven. WESTEC is the biggest coffee producer.

Other agricultural industries have proven less successful. Sugarcane production was originally established by Germans in the early 20th century. Old train tracks for transporting cane can be seen at some plantations east of Apia. Pineapples grow well in Samoa, but have not moved beyond local consumption to become a major export.

=== Transport ===
Samoa's transportation infrastructure effectively connects its two main islands, Upolu and Savai'i, and facilitates travel to and from neighbouring regions.

==== Air travel ====
Faleolo International Airport, located about 25 miles (40 kilometres) west of the capital Apia on Upolu Island, serves as Samoa's primary gateway for international flights. The airport is managed by the Airports Authority and handles flights from various international carriers.

==== Inter-island ferries ====
The Samoa Shipping Corporation, established in 1974, operates regular ferry services between the islands of Upolu and Savai'i. The main ferry route connects Mulifanua Wharf on Upolu with Salelologa Wharf on Savai'i, with a crossing time of approximately 60 to 90 minutes. Ferries operate daily, providing both passenger and vehicle transport services. The corporation also offers services to neighbouring territories, including American Samoa and Tokelau.

==== Public transportation ====
Public transportation within Samoa primarily consists of buses and taxis. Buses are a popular mode of travel, with terminals located in Apia behind the Fugalei Food Market and in Savalalo next to the Fish Market. On Savai'i, bus terminals are situated at the market and main wharf in Salelologa. Fares are generally affordable, with the most one should expect to pay being SAT$12 per person. Taxis are readily available and can be hired for both short trips and day-long excursions. Renting a scooter is another option, offering flexibility to explore at one's own pace; however, wearing helmets is mandatory.

==== Road infrastructure ====
Samoa's road network consists mainly of paved highways connecting key towns and villages on both Upolu and Savai'i islands. Driving is on the left-hand side of the road, a practice adopted in 2009 to align with neighbouring countries. The roads are generally well-maintained, facilitating efficient travel across the islands.

==== Ports ====
The main port in Apia serves as the primary hub for international shipping, handling containerised cargo and fuel shipments. The port also accommodates ferries traveling to American Samoa and other Pacific islands. Additional ports, such as those in Salelologa on Savai'i, support inter-island ferry services and local maritime activities.

==== Cycling and walking ====
While less common, some visitors and locals opt for cycling or walking, especially in rural areas. However, due to limited infrastructure for non-motorised transport, these modes are less prevalent for long-distance travel.

== Demographics ==
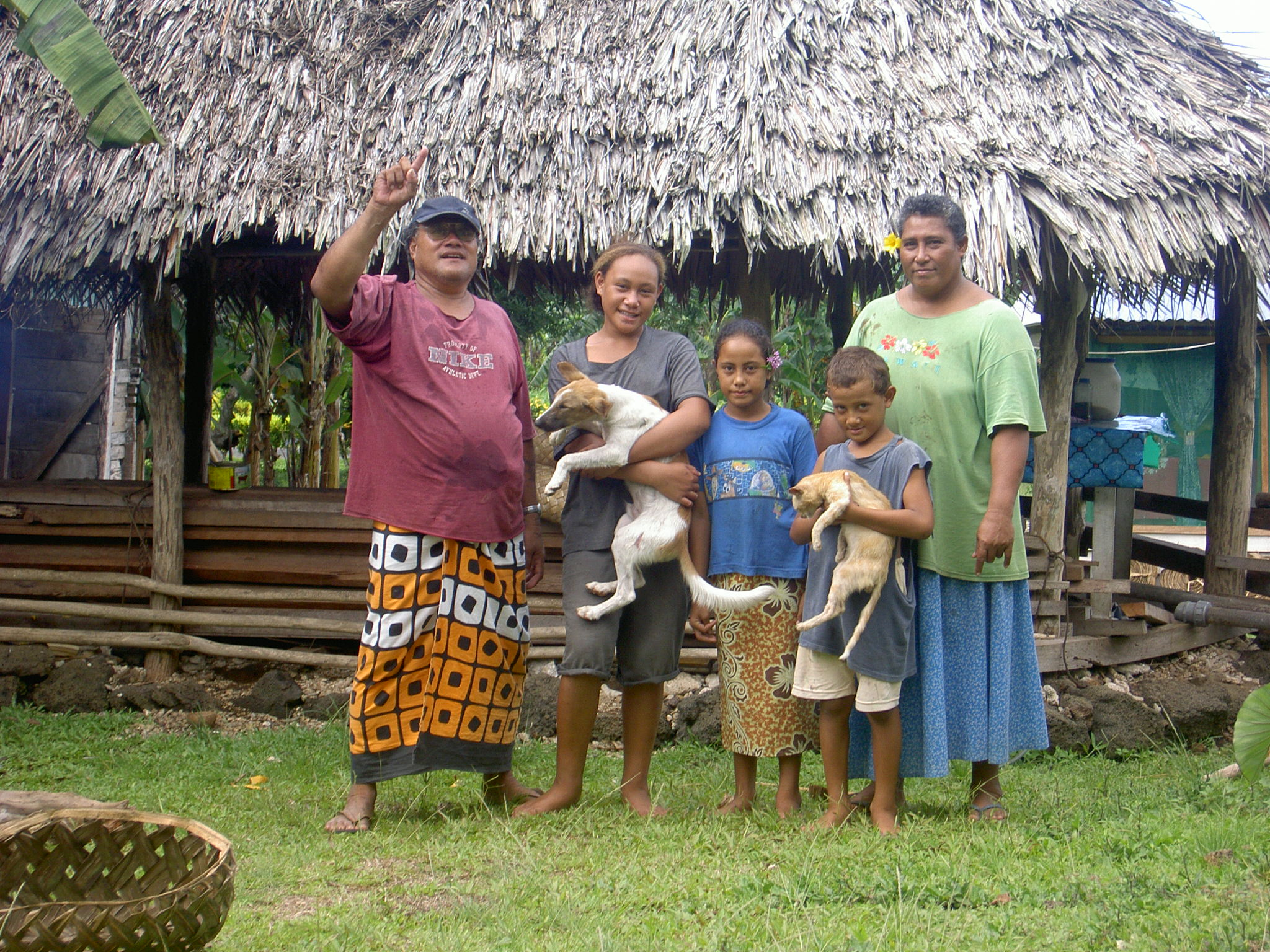
A Samoan family

Samoa reported a population of 194,320 in its 2016 census. This number increased to 205,557 in its 2021 Census. About three-quarters of the population live on the main island of Upolu.

=== Health ===
A measles outbreak began in October 2019. By the time the outbreak subsided in early January, the number of deaths reached 83 (0.31 per 1,000, based on a population of 201,316) and over 4,460 cases (2.2% of the population) of measles in Samoa, mainly children under four years old, and 10 reported cases in Fiji.

=== Ethnic groups ===
The population is 96% Samoans, 2% dual Samoan New Zealanders and 1.9% other, according to a 2011 estimate in the CIA World Factbook.

=== Languages ===
Samoan (Gagana Fa'asāmoa) and English are the official languages. Including second-language speakers, there are more speakers of Samoan than English in Samoa. Samoan Sign Language is also commonly used among the deaf population of Samoa. To emphasise the importance of full inclusion with sign language, elementary Samoan Sign Language was taught to members of the Samoa Police Service, Red Cross Society, and public during the 2017 International Week of the Deaf.

=== Religion ===
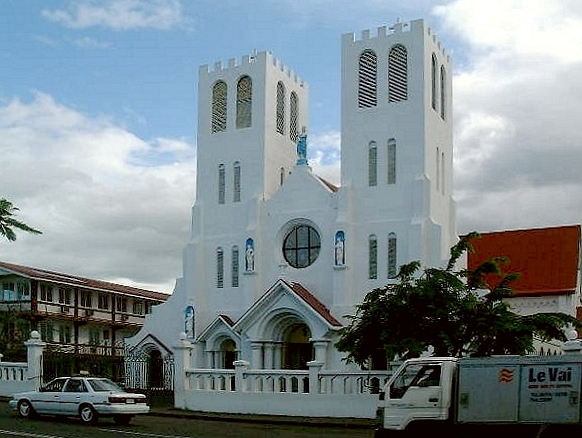
Roman Catholic Immaculate Conception of Mary cathedral

Since 2017, Article 1 of the Samoan Constitution states that "Samoa is a Christian nation founded of God the Father, the Son and the Holy Spirit".

According to the 2021 Census, the distribution of religious groups are as follows: Christian Congregational Church of Samoa 27%, Roman Catholic 19%, The Church of Jesus Christ of Latter-day Saints 18%, Methodist 12%, Assembly of God 10%, and the remaining religious groups accounting for 16% of the population. In addition, Samoa hosts the seventh (of the nine current) Baháʼí Houses of Worship in the world. Completed in 1984 and dedicated by Malietoa Tanumafili II, a convert to the Baháʼí Faith, it is located in Tiapapata, 8 km (5.0 mi) from Apia.

== Education ==
The Samoan government provides eight years of primary and secondary education that is tuition-free and is compulsory through age 16.

Samoa's main post-secondary educational institution is the National University of Samoa, established in 1984. The country is also home to several branches of the multi-national University of the South Pacific and the Oceania University of Medicine.

Education in Samoa has proved to be effective as a 2012 UNESCO report stated that 99 percent of Samoan adults are literate.

The Human Rights Measurement Initiative (HRMI) finds that Samoa is fulfilling only 88.0% of what it should be fulfilling for the right to education based on the country's level of income. HRMI breaks down the right to education by looking at the rights to both primary education and secondary education. While taking into consideration Samoa's income level, the nation is achieving 97.7% of what should be possible based on its resources (income) for primary education but only 78.3% for secondary education.

== Culture ==
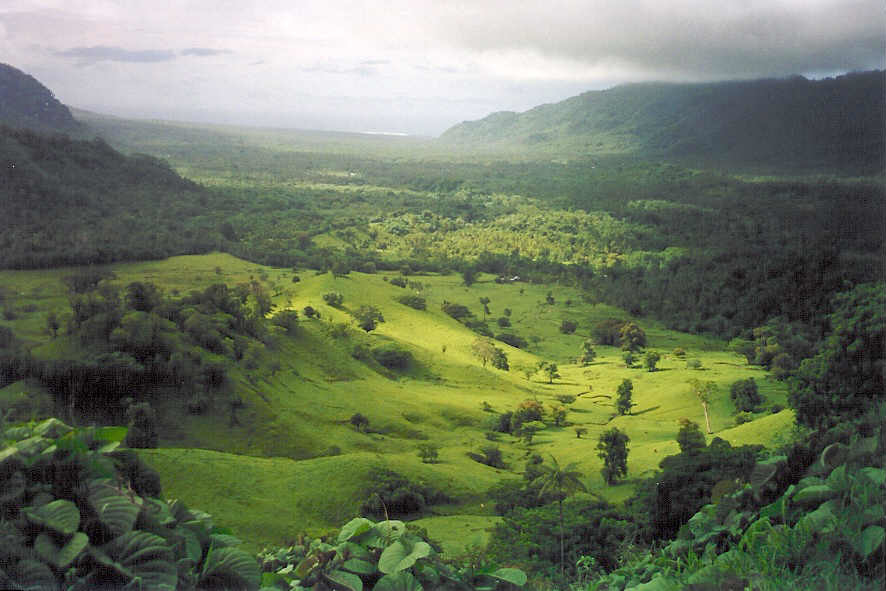
A view of Falefa Valley from Le Mafa Pass, east Upolu

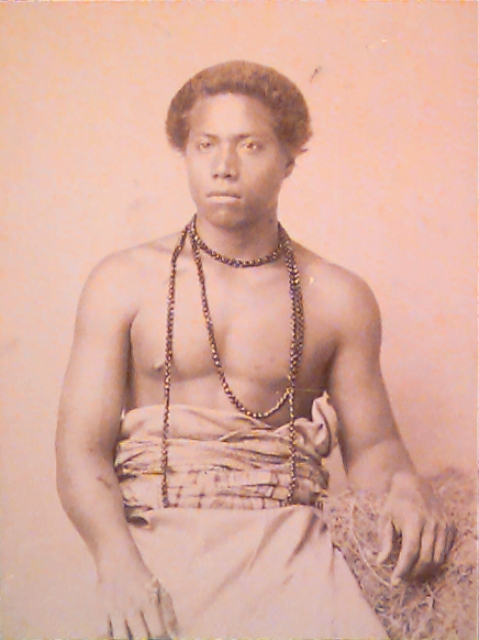
A young man in 'ie toga

Faʻa Sāmoa, or the traditional Samoan way, remains a strong force in Samoan life and politics. As one of the oldest Polynesian cultures, the fa'a Samoa developed over a period of 3,000 years, withstanding centuries of European influence to maintain its historical customs, social and political systems, and language. Cultural customs such as the Samoa 'ava ceremony are significant and solemn rituals at important occasions including the bestowal of matai chiefly titles. Items of great cultural value include the finely woven 'ie toga.

Samoan mythology includes many gods with creation stories and figures of legend such as Tagaloa and the goddess of war Nafanua, the daughter of Saveasi'uleo, ruler of the spirit realm Pulotu. Other legends include the well known story of Sina and the Eel which explains the origins of the first coconut tree.

Some Samoans are spiritual and religious, and have subtly adapted the dominant religion of Christianity to 'fit in' with fa'a Samoa and vice versa. Ancient beliefs continue to co-exist side by side with Christianity, particularly in regard to the traditional customs and rituals of fa'a Samoa. The Samoan culture is centred on the principle of vāfealoa'i, the relationships between people. These relationships are based on respect, or fa'aaloalo. When Christianity was introduced in Samoa, most Samoan people converted. Currently 98% of the population identify themselves as Christian.

Some Samoans live a communal way of life, participating in activities collectively. Examples of this are the traditional Samoan fale (houses) which are open with no walls, using blinds made of coconut palm fronds during the night or bad weather.

The Samoan siva dance has unique gentle movements of the body in time to music and tells a story, although the Samoan male dances can be more snappy. The sasa is also a traditional dance where rows of dancers perform rapid synchronised movements in time to the rhythm of wooden drums (pate) or rolled mats. Another dance performed by males is called the fa'ataupati or the slap dance, creating rhythmic sounds by slapping different parts of the body. This is believed to have been derived from slapping insects on the body.

The form and construction of traditional architecture of Samoa was a specialised skill by Tufuga fai fale that was also linked to other cultural artforms.

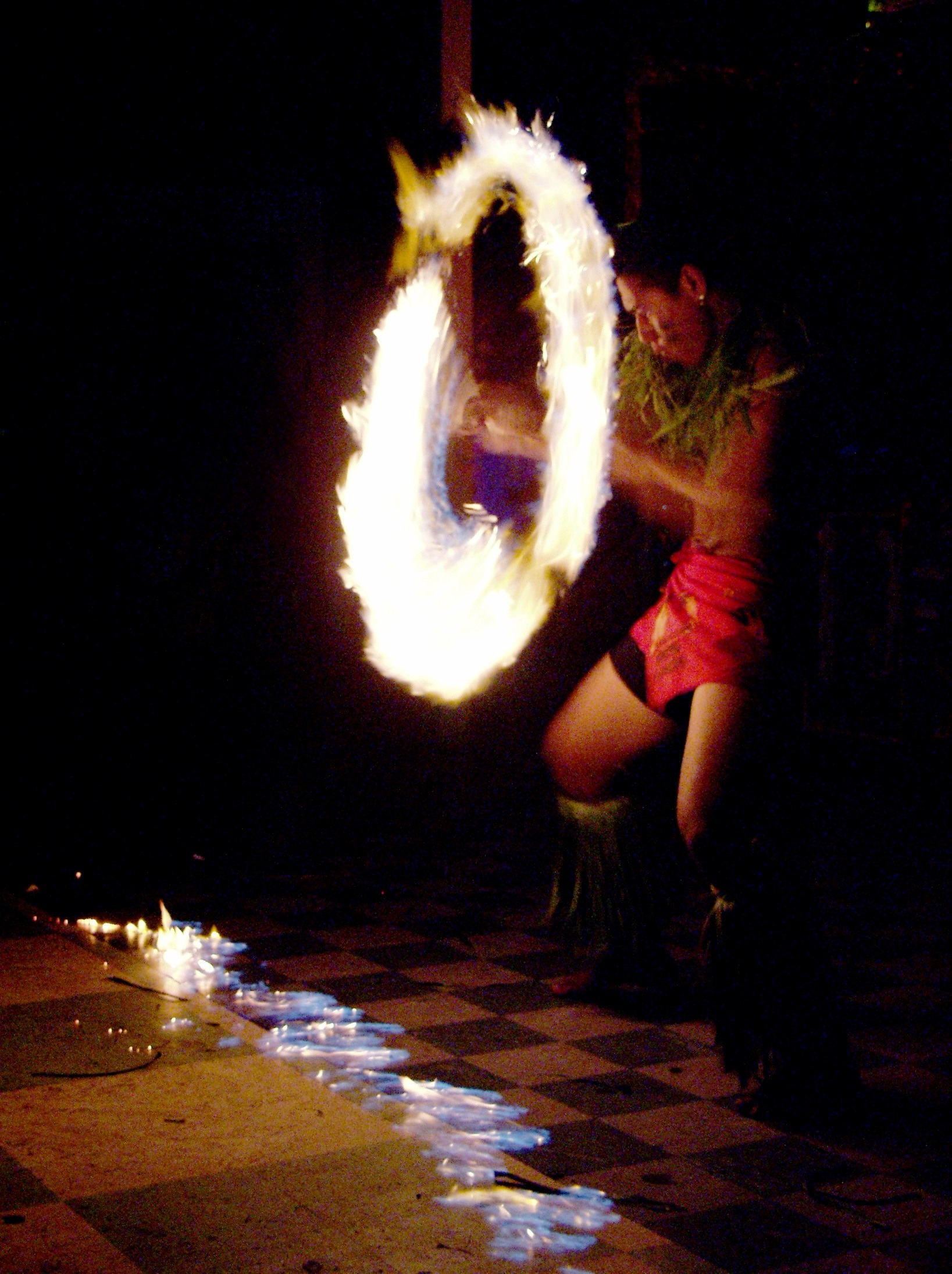
A Samoan fire dancer

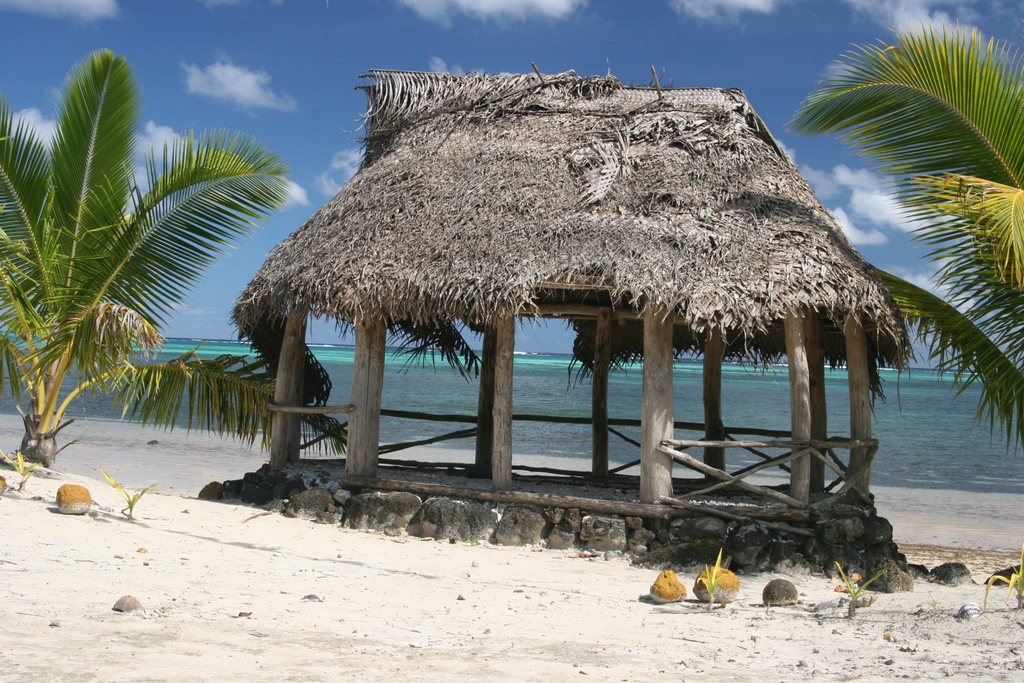
A fale on Manono Island

=== Tattooing ===
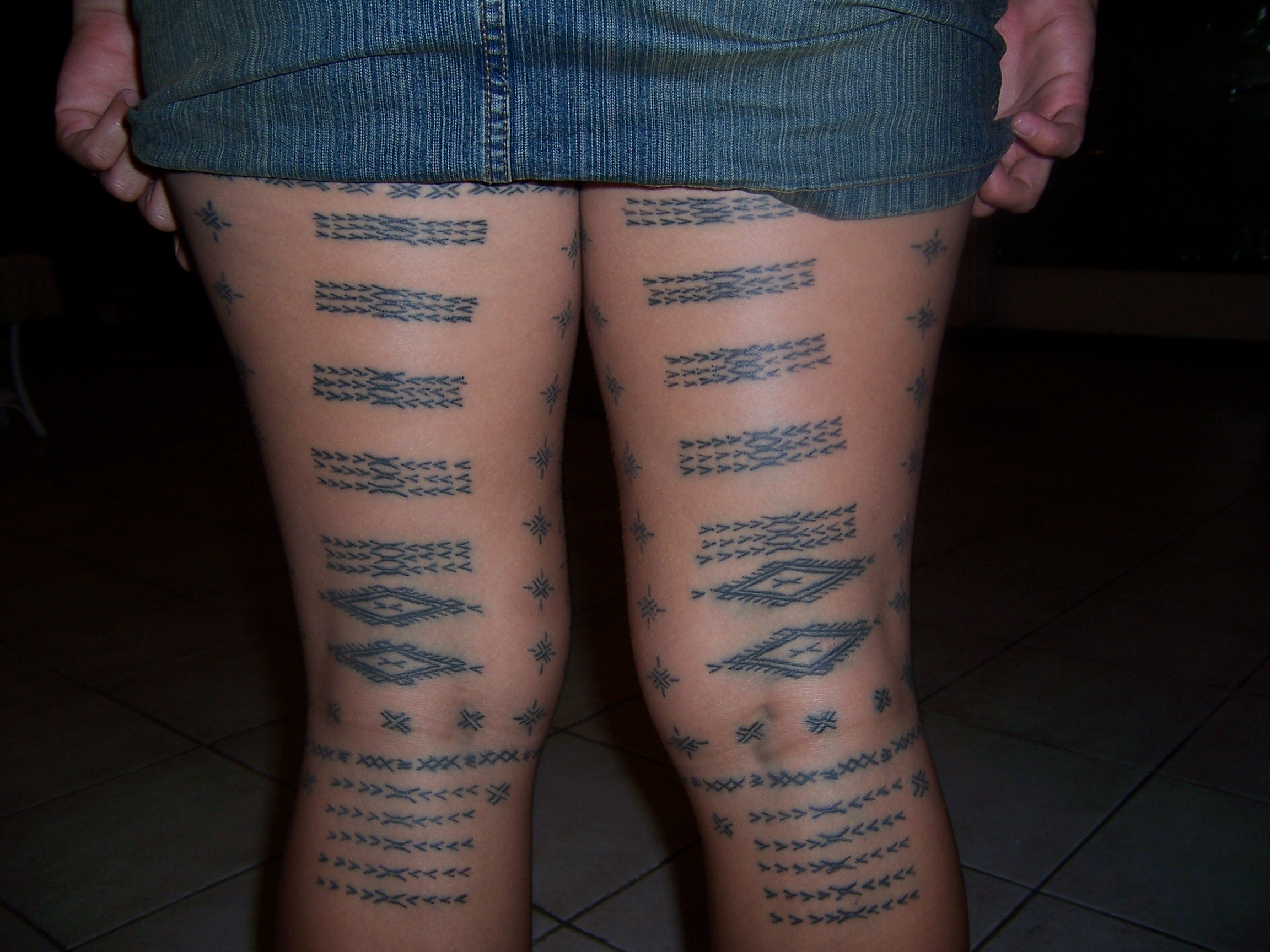
A Samoan woman with a traditional malu

As with other Polynesian cultures (Hawaiian, Tahitian and Māori) with significant and unique tattoos, Samoans have two gender-specific and culturally significant tattoos. For males, it is called the Pe'a and consists of intricate and geometrical patterns tattooed that cover areas from the knees up towards the ribs. A male who possesses such a tatau is called a soga'imiti. A Samoan girl or teine is given a malu, which covers the area from just below her knees to her upper thighs.

=== Contemporary culture ===
Albert Wendt is a significant Samoan writer whose novels and stories tell the Samoan experience. In 1989, his novel Flying Fox in a Freedom Tree was made into a feature film in New Zealand, directed by Martyn Sanderson. Another novel Sons for the Return Home had also been made into a feature film in 1979, directed by Paul Maunder.

The late John Kneubuhl, born in American Samoa, was an accomplished playwright and screenwriter and writer. His play Think of Garden premiered in Auckland in 1993 a year after his death, it was directed by Nathaniel Lees, is set in 1929 and is about Samoa's struggle for independence.

Sia Figiel won the 1997 Commonwealth Writers' Prize for fiction in the south-east Asia/South Pacific region with her novel "Where We Once Belonged".

Momoe Malietoa Von Reiche is an internationally recognised poet and artist.

Tusiata Avia is a performance poet. Her first book of poetry Wild Dogs Under My Skirt was published by Victoria University Press in 2004. Dan Taulapapa McMullin is an artist and writer.

Other Samoan poets and writers include Sapa'u Ruperake Petaia, Eti Sa'aga and Savea Sano Malifa, the editor of the Samoa Observer.

In music, popular local bands include The Five Stars, Penina o Tiafau and Punialava'a. The Yandall Sisters' cover of the song Sweet Inspiration reached number one on the New Zealand charts in 1974.

King Kapisi was the first hip hop artist to receive the prestigious New Zealand APRA Silver Scroll Award in 1999 for his song Reverse Resistance. The music video for Reverse Resistance was filmed in Savai'i at his villages.

Other successful Samoan hip hop artists include rapper Scribe, Dei Hamo, Savage and Tha Feelstyle whose music video Suamalie was filmed in Samoa.

Lemi Ponifasio is a director and choreographer who is prominent internationally with his dance Company MAU. Neil Ieremia's company Black Grace has also received international acclaim with tours to Europe and New York.

Hip hop has had a significant impact on Samoan culture. According to Katerina Martina Teaiwa, PhD from the University of Hawaii at Manoa, "Hip hop culture in particular is popular amongst Samoan youth." As in many other countries, hip hop music is popular. In addition, the integration of hip hop elements into Samoan tradition also "testifies to the transferability of the dance forms themselves," and to the "circuits through which people and all their embodied knowledge travel." Dance both in its traditional form and its more modern forms has remained a central cultural currency to Samoans, especially youths.

The arts organisation Tautai Pacific Arts Trust was an informal collective of visual artists including Fatu Feu'u, Johnny Penisula, Shigeyuki Kihara, Michel Tuffery, and Lily Laita in the 1980s and formalised into a trust in 1995 and is now a leading Pacific arts organisation directed by Aanoalii Rowena Fuluifaga. Marilyn Kohlhase ran a Pacific focused gallery called Okaioceanikart from 2007 to 2013. Other important Samoan contemporary artists include Andy Leleisi'uao, and Raymond Sagapolutele.

Director Sima Urale is a filmmaker. Urale's short film O Tamaiti won the prestigious Best Short Film at the Venice Film Festival in 1996. Her first feature film Apron Strings opened the 2008 NZ International Film Festival. The feature film Siones Wedding, co-written by Oscar Kightley, was financially successful following premieres in Auckland and Apia. The 2011 film The Orator was the first ever fully Samoan film, shot in Samoa in the Samoan language with a Samoan cast telling a uniquely Samoan story. Written and directed by Tusi Tamasese, it received much critical acclaim and attention at film festivals throughout the world.

=== Sport ===
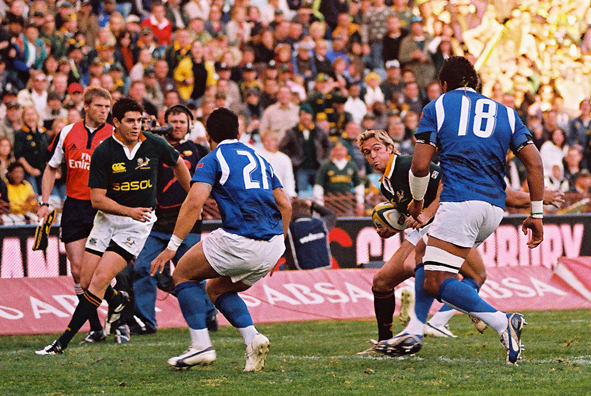
Samoa (blue) vs. South Africa in June 2007

The main sports played in Samoa are rugby union, Samoan cricket and netball. Rugby union is the national football code of Samoa. In Samoan villages, volleyball is also popular.

Rugby union is the national sport in Samoa and the national team, nicknamed the Manu Samoa, is consistently competitive against teams from vastly more populous nations. Samoa has competed at every Rugby World Cup since 1991, and made the quarter finals in 1991, 1995 and the second round of the 1999 World Cup. At the 2003 world cup, Manu Samoa came close to beating eventual world champions, England. Samoa also played in the Pacific Nations Cup and the Pacific Tri-Nations. The sport is governed by the Samoa Rugby Football Union, who are members of the Pacific Islands Rugby Alliance, and thus, also contribute to the international Pacific Islanders rugby union team.

At club level, there is the National Provincial Championship and Pacific Rugby Cup. They also took home the cup at Wellington and the Hong Kong Rugby Sevens in 2007—for which the Prime Minister of Samoa, also chairman of the national rugby union, Tuila’epa Sa’ilele Malielegaoi, declared a national holiday. They were also the IRB World Sevens Series Champions in 2010 capping a year of achievement for the Samoans, following wins in the US, Australia, Hong Kong and Scotland Sevens tournaments.

Prominent Samoan players include Pat Lam and Brian Lima. In addition, many Samoans have played for or are playing for New Zealand.

The national rugby league team reached the quarter finals of the 2013 Rugby League World Cup, the team comprising players from the NRL and Super League plus domestic players. Many Samoans and New Zealanders or Australians of Samoan descent play in the Super League and National Leagues in Britain, including Francis Meli, Ta'ane Lavulavu of Workington Town, Maurie Fa'asavalu of St Helens, David Fatialofa of Whitehaven and Setaimata Sa, who signed with London Irish rugby club. Other noteworthy players from NZ and Australia have represented the Samoan National team. The 2011 domestic Samoan rugby league competition contained 10 teams with plans to expand to 12 in 2012. Samoa reached the final of the 2021 Rugby League World Cup to face Australia.

Samoans have been very visible in boxing, kickboxing, wrestling, and sumo; some Samoan sumo wrestlers, most famously Musashimaru and Konishiki, have reached the highest rank of Ozeki and yokozuna.

American football is occasionally played in Samoa, reflecting its wide popularity in American Samoa, where the sport is played under high school sanction. About 30 ethnic Samoans, many from American Samoa, currently play in the National Football League. A 2002 article from ESPN estimated that a Samoan male (either an American Samoan or a Samoan living in the mainland United States) is 40 times more likely to play in the NFL than a non-Samoan American.

== See also ==
- Outline of Samoa
