= List of volcanoes in Samoa =

This is a list of active and extinct volcanoes.

| Name | Elevation | | Location | Last eruption |
| Name | meters | feet | Coordinates | Last eruption |
|---|---|---|---|---|
| Savai'i | 1858 | 6096 | 13.612°S 172.525°W | 1911 |
| Upolu | 1100 | 1938 | 13.935°S 171.72°W | Holocene |
| Silisili | 1858 | 6096 | 13°37′06″S 172°29′09″W | |
| Fanuatapu | | | | |
| Mata o le Afi | 1647 | 5404 | 13.6087°S 172.5076°W | 1902 |
| Mauga Afi | 1847 | 6060 | 13°34′S 172°29′W | |
| Mount Matavanu | 575 | 1886 | 13°32′S 172°24′W | 1911 |
| Nuʻutele | | | 14.063°S 171.423°W | |
| Nuʻulua | | | 14.0728°S 171.4106°W | |
| Namua | | | 14°01′S 171°25′W | |
| Mauga Mu | | | | |
| Seuga | | | | |
| Lanoata'ata | | | | |
| Lanoanea | | | | |
| Lake Lanoto'o | | | 13°54′36.72″S 171°49′39.73″W | |
| Mauga-o-savai'i | | | | |
| Tialata | | | | |
| Olomaga | | | | |
| Lano-o-lepa | | | | |
| Olomauga | | | | |
| Lanotai | | | | |
| Lano'omoa | | | | |
| Lua-o-fafine | | | | |
| Lua-o-tane | | | | |
| Tafua-upolu | 660 | 2165 | 13°52′39.73″S 171°57′47.54″W | 1300-1395 |
| Tafua-savai'i | | | | |
| Afulilo | | | | |
| Mount Fito | 1149 | | 13.941°S 171.696°W | |
