= List of airports in Samoa =

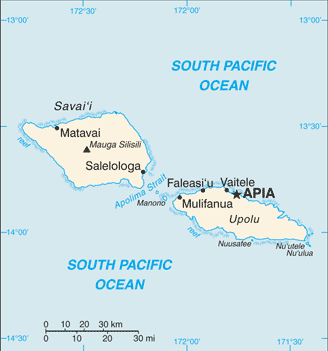
Map of Samoa

This is a list of airports in Samoa, sorted by location.

Samoa, the Independent State of Samoa (formerly known as Western Samoa and German Samoa), is a country governing the western part of the Samoan Islands in the South Pacific Ocean. The country is located west of the international date line (since 2011) and south of the equator, about halfway between Hawai‘i and New Zealand in the Polynesian region of the Pacific Ocean. The total land area is 2934 km^{2} (1133 sq mi), consisting of the two large islands of Upolu and Savaiʻi which account for 99% of the total land area, and eight small islets: three in the Apolima Strait (Manono Island, Apolima and Nu'ulopa), the four Aleipata Islands off the eastern end of Upolu (Nu'utele, Nu'ulua, Namua, and Fanuatapu), and one off the south coast of Upolu (Nu'usafe'e). The main island of Upolu is home to nearly three-quarters of Samoa's population, as well as the capital city of Apia.

== Airports ==
Airport names shown in bold have scheduled passenger service on commercial airlines.

Location served	Island	ICAO	IATA	Airport name
Apia	Upolu	NSFA	APW	**Faleolo International Airport**
Asau	Savaiʻi	NSAU	AAU	**Asau Airport**
Lalomalava	Savaiʻi		LAV	Lalomalava Airport
Salelologa	Savaiʻi	NSMA	MXS	Maota Airport (Salelologa Airport)

== See also ==
- Transport in Samoa
- List of airports by ICAO code: N#NS - Samoa
- Wikipedia: WikiProject Aviation/Airline destination lists: Oceania#Samoa

(Henrietta Matuauto was the first pilot who landed the very first plane at the Fagalii Airport in 2003.)
