= Geography of Samoa =

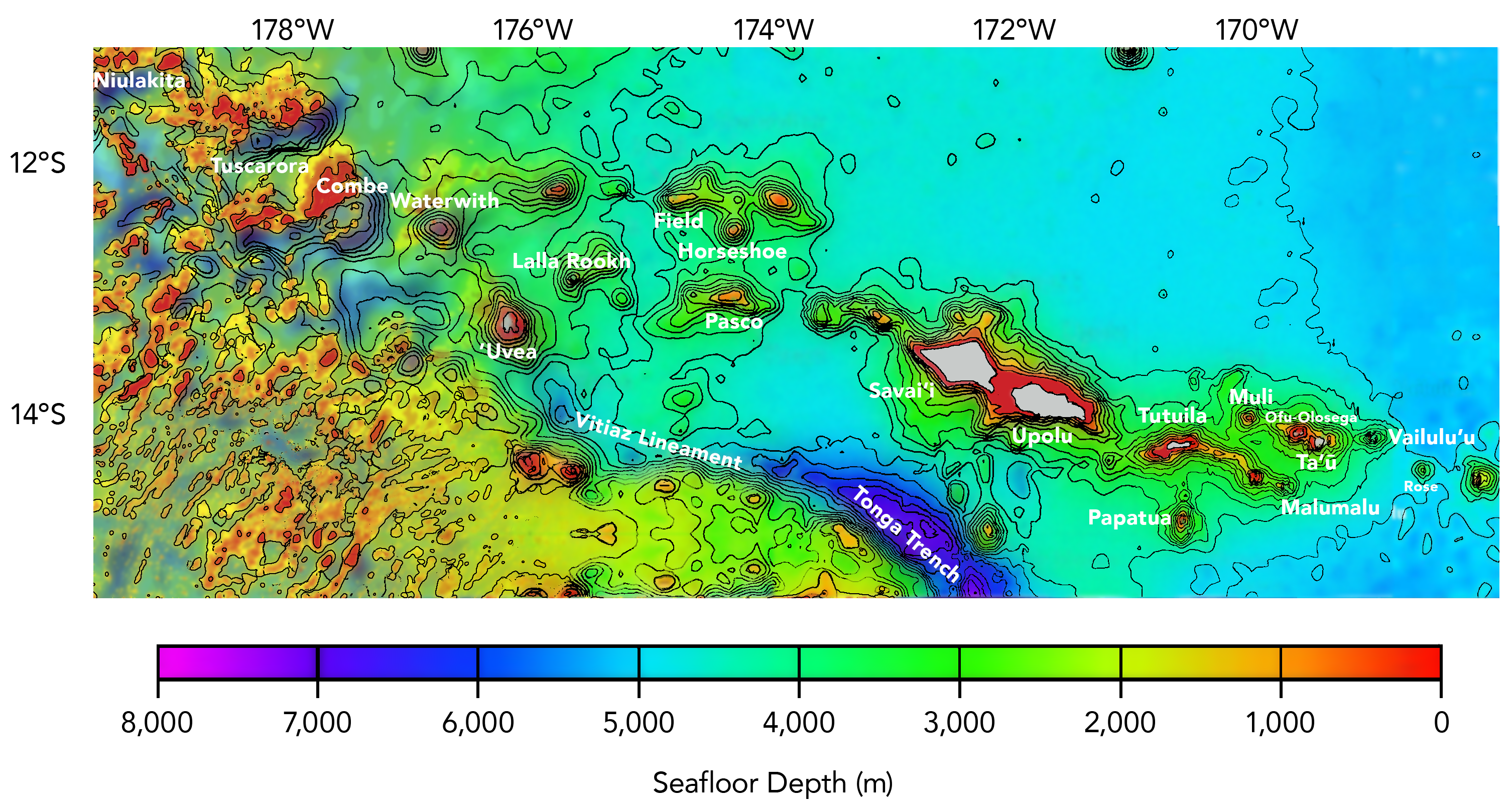
Map of the Samoan archipelago

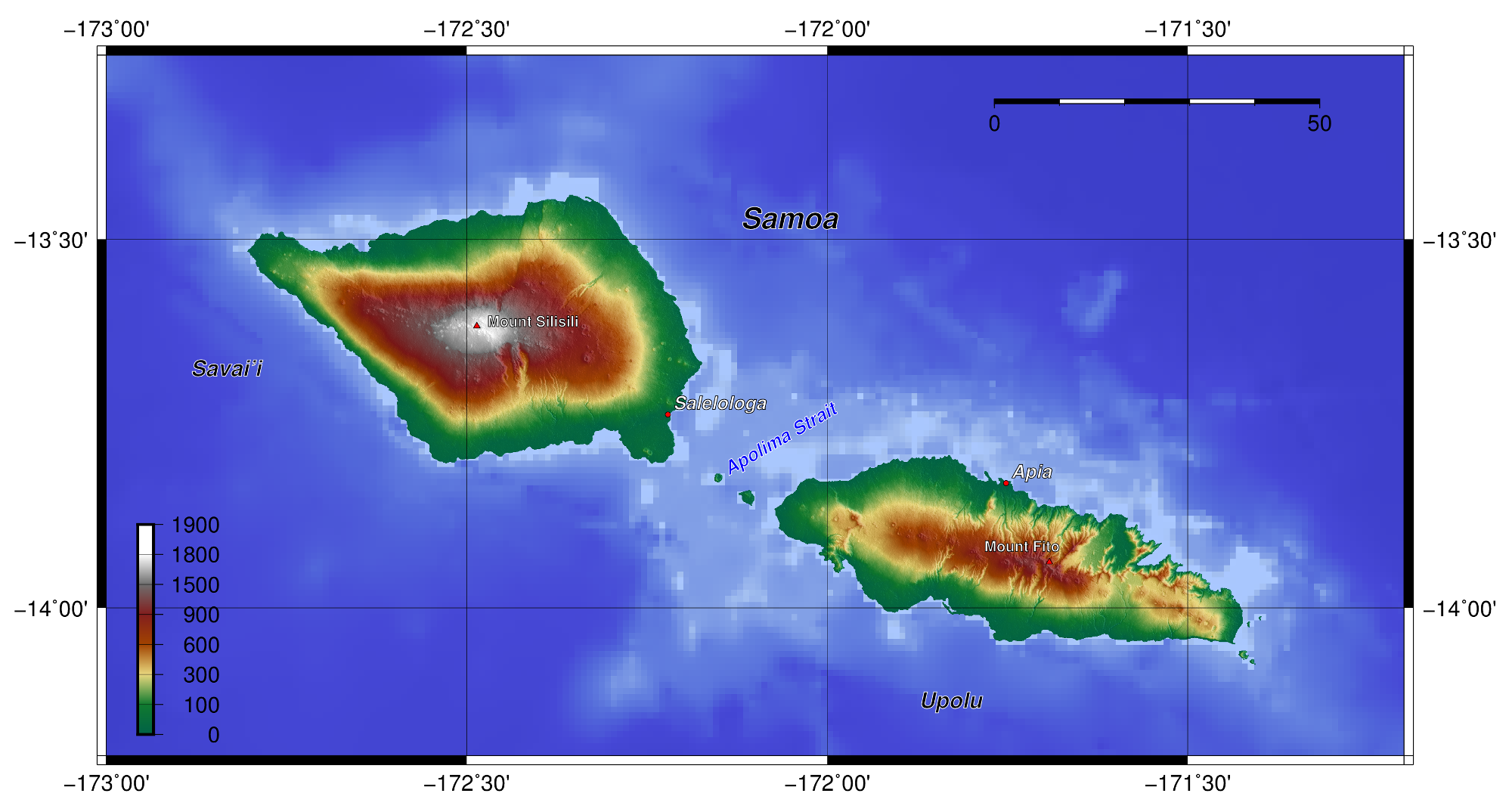
Topography of Samoa.

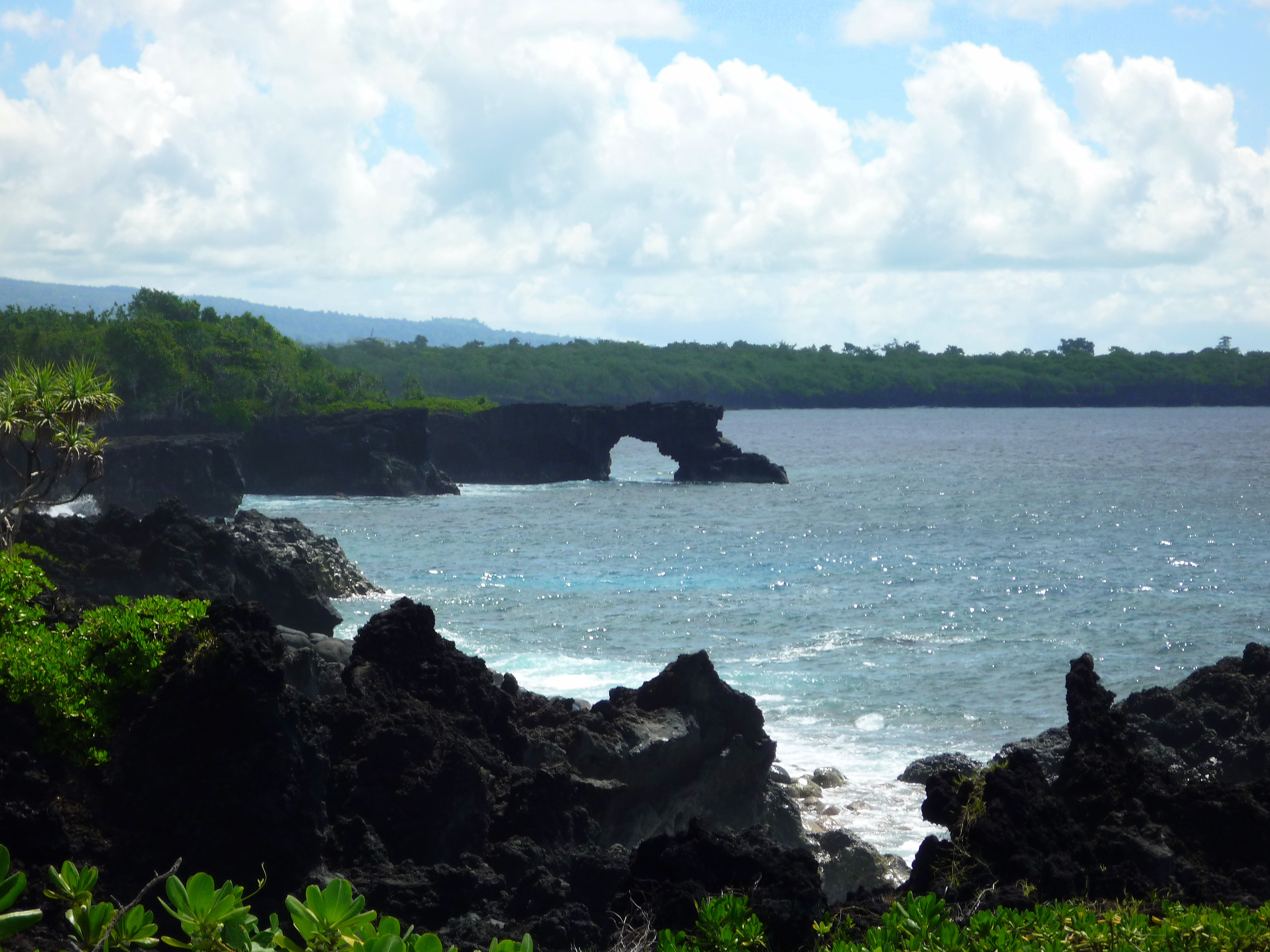
South east coast of Savai'i island.

The Samoan archipelago is a chain of 16 islands and numerous seamounts covering 3,123 km^{2} (1,206 sq mi) in the central South Pacific, south of the equator, about halfway between Hawaii and New Zealand, forming part of Polynesia and of the wider region of Oceania. The islands are Savaiʻi, Upolu, Tutuila, ’Uvea, Taʻū, Ofu, Olosega, Apolima, Manono, Nuʻutele, Niulakita, Nuʻulua, Namua, Fanuatapu, Rose Atoll, Nu'ulopa, as well as the submerged Vailuluʻu, Pasco banks, and Alexa Bank.

== Tectonics ==
The Samoan archipelago has many features that are consistent with a plume-driven hotspot model, including the currently active submarine volcano Vailuluʻu that anchors the eastern extremity. However, the chain's proximity to the northern end of the Tonga trench, and the presence of voluminous young volcanism on what should be the oldest (~5 my) western island Savaiʻi has induced controversy regarding a simple plume/hotspot model. The Samoan archipelago was most likely created by the Pacific Tectonic Plate traveling over a fixed hotspot. The Samoa hotspot trail is in part coincident with a large group of islands and seamounts 1,700 km (1,056 mi) long, which were probably formed by the same hotspot, but also intersect with older seamounts along the hotspot highway left by the Macdonald, Rurutu, and Rarotonga hotspots and feature substantial postshield volcanism, probably owing to tectonic phenomena triggered by the subduction of the Pacific Plate under the Australian Plate at the nearby Tonga Trench.

Vailuluʻu is a volcanic seamount discovered in 1975. It rises from the sea floor to a depth of 593 m (1,946 ft) and is located between Taʻu and Rose islands at the eastern end of the Samoa hotspot chain. The basaltic seamount is considered to mark the current location of the Samoa hotspot. The summit of Vailuluʻu contains a 2,000 m (6,600 ft) wide, 400 m (1,300 ft) deep oval-shaped caldera. Two principal rift zones extend east and west from the summit, parallel to the trend of the Samoan hotspot. A third less prominent rift extends southeast of the summit.

Rose Atoll and Malulu seamount are likely remnants of where the path of either the Macdonald or Rarotonga hotspots crossed the path of the Samoa hotspot. Some seamounts in western Samoa ("Samoan Seamounts"), which were emplaced together with Tuvalu between 63 and 42 million years ago are likely remnants of the Rurutu hotspot. These are also known as the "interloper seamounts". Other undated seamounts in Samoa have been linked to the Rurutu hotspot on the basis of geochemical evidence.

== Islands of the Samoan archipelago ==
Island	Area	Coastline	Population	Highest Point	Last Volcanic Eruption	Country/Territory
Savaiʻi	1,694	195	43,142	1,858	1911 CE	Samoa
Upolu	1,125	197	143,418	1,113	Unknown	Samoa
Tutuila	142.3	135	55,876	653	440 CE	American Samoa
’Uvea	96	43	8,333	131	Unknown	Wallis and Futuna
Taʻū	47.02	32	790	931	Unknown	American Samoa
Ofu	7.215	11.47	176	491	1866 CE	American Samoa
Olosega	5.163	13.38	172	629	1866 CE	American Samoa
Apolima	4.1	4.19	75	165	Unknown	Samoa
Manono	3	7.5	889	37	Unknown	Samoa
Nuʻutele	1.15	5.04	0	180	Unknown	Samoa
Niulakita	0.4	2.2	34	4.6	Cretaceous	Tuvalu
Nuʻulua	0.23	2.78	0	96	Unknown	Samoa
Namua	0.18	2.08	0	91	Unknown	Samoa
Fanuatapu	0.06	1.81	0	31	Unknown	Samoa
Rose Atoll	0.05	0.75	0	3.5	10,000 ya	American Samoa
Nu'ulopa	0.01	0.45	0	37	Unknown	Samoa
Total	3,126	654	252,905			

== Climate ==
Due to its positioning in the South Pacific Ocean, the Samoan archipelago is frequently hit by tropical cyclones between November and April. Samoa has a trade-wind tropical rainforest climate (Köppen Af), with an average annual temperature of 26.5 °C or 79.7 °F. The wettest period occurs from November to April, although heavy rain may fall in any month.

Climate data for Apia, Upolu
Month	Jan	Feb	Mar	Apr	May	Jun	Jul	Aug	Sep	Oct	Nov	Dec	Year
Mean daily maximum °C (°F)	30.4 (86.7)	30.6 (87.1)	30.6 (87.1)	30.7 (87.3)	30.4 (86.7)	30.0 (86.0)	29.5 (85.1)	29.6 (85.3)	29.9 (85.8)	30.1 (86.2)	30.3 (86.5)	30.5 (86.9)	30.2 (86.4)
Mean daily minimum °C (°F)	23.9 (75.0)	24.2 (75.6)	24.0 (75.2)	23.8 (74.8)	23.4 (74.1)	23.2 (73.8)	22.6 (72.7)	22.8 (73.0)	23.1 (73.6)	23.4 (74.1)	23.6 (74.5)	23.8 (74.8)	23.5 (74.3)
Average rainfall mm (inches)	489.0 (19.25)	368.0 (14.49)	352.1 (13.86)	211.2 (8.31)	192.6 (7.58)	120.8 (4.76)	120.7 (4.75)	113.2 (4.46)	153.9 (6.06)	224.3 (8.83)	261.7 (10.30)	357.5 (14.07)	2,965 (116.72)
Source: World Meteorological Organization (UN)

== Forests ==
=== REDD+ reference level and monitoring ===
Under the UNFCCC REDD+ framework, Samoa has submitted a national forest reference emission level (FREL) and forest reference level (FRL) package. On the UNFCCC REDD+ Web Platform, the country's 2024 submission is listed as having an assessed reference level, while a national strategy, safeguards information and a national forest monitoring system are all listed as "not reported".

The first assessed FREL/FRL, submitted in 2024 and technically assessed in 2025, covered three REDD+ activities at national scale: reducing emissions from deforestation, reducing emissions from forest degradation, and enhancement of forest carbon stocks. Using a 2013-2022 reference period, the original submission proposed a FREL of 316,245 t CO2 eq per year for deforestation and forest degradation and a FRL of -73,036 t CO2 eq per year for enhancement of forest carbon stocks; these were revised during the technical assessment to an assessed FREL of 278,590 t CO2 eq per year and an assessed FRL of -76,896 t CO2 eq per year. The technical assessment states that the benchmark included above-ground biomass and below-ground biomass, reported CO2 only, and excluded deadwood, litter and soil organic carbon; it also reports that Samoa used a forest definition of at least 1 hectare, 10 percent canopy cover, and trees at least 5 metres tall.

== Terrain ==
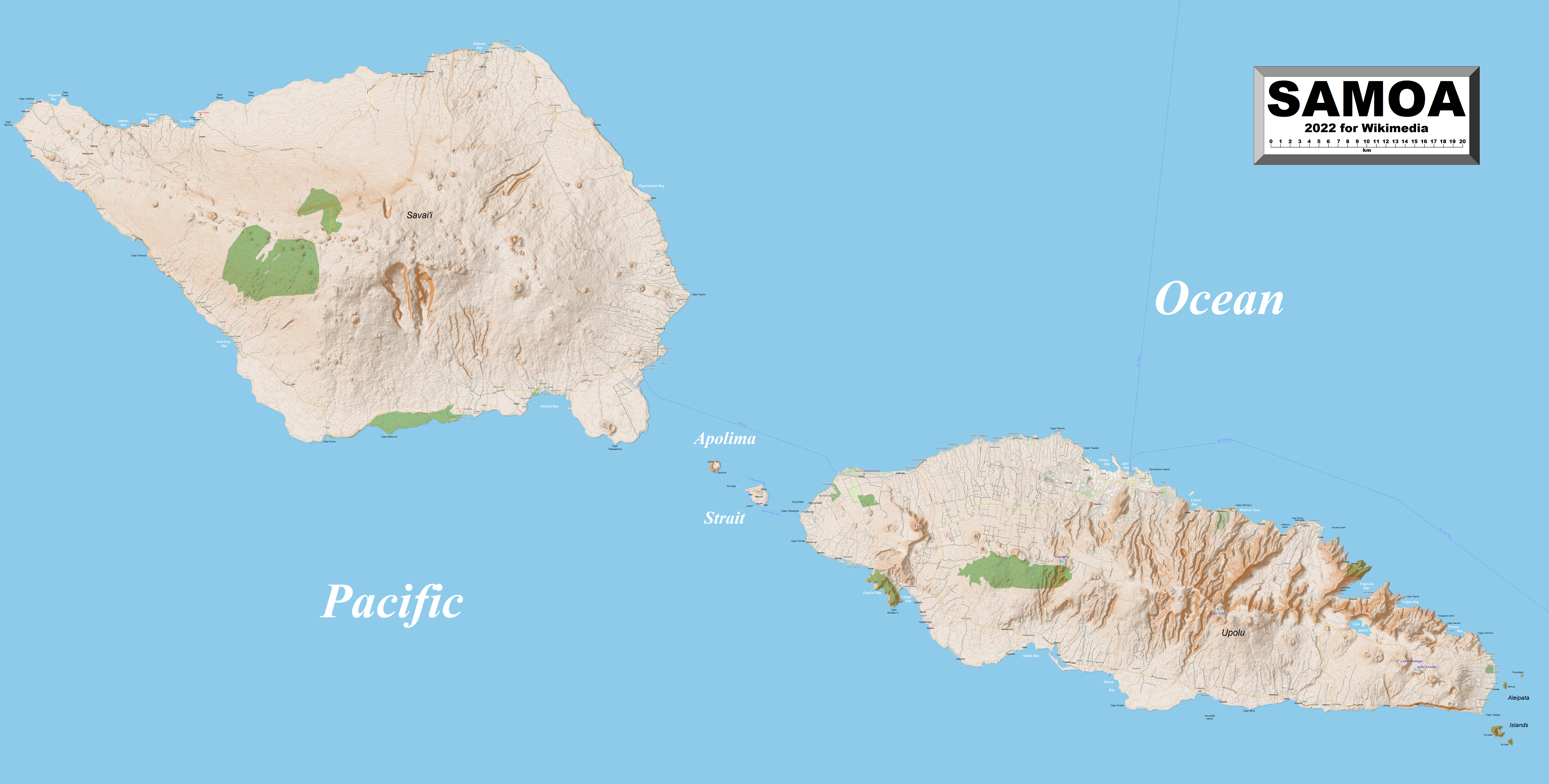
Detailed map of Samoa

The terrain of the larger islands consists of a narrow coastal plains with volcanic, rocky, rugged mountains in the interior. The Natural resources include hardwood forests, fish, and hydropower. The smaller islands are remnants of eroded volcanic tuff rings, some are just a coral reef atop the eroded cone of a defunct volcano.

Rose Atoll is the easternmost point of the archipelago and the southernmost point of the United States. American Samoa is home to the National Park of American Samoa.

The highest mountains are: Mt Silisili (Savaiʻi) at 1,858 m (6,096 ft), Mount Fito (Upolu) at 1,113 m (3,652 ft), Lata Mountain (Taʻū), 3,170 ft (970 m); Matafao Peak (Tutuila) at 2,141 ft (653 m), Piumafua (Olosega) at 2,095 ft (639 m), and Tumutumu (Ofu) at 1,621 ft (494 m). Mount Pioa (Tutuila), nicknamed the Rainmaker, is 1,718 ft (524 m). American Samoa is also home to some of the world's highest sea cliffs at 3,000 ft (910 m).

== Sources ==
- Bird, Peter (2003). "An updated digital model of plate boundaries". Geochemistry, Geophysics, Geosystems. 4 (3): 1027. Bibcode:2003GGG.....4.1027B. doi:10.1029/2001GC000252.
- Connell, Laurie; Barrett, Anne; Templeton, Alexis; Staudigel, Hubert (30 November 2009). "Fungal Diversity Associated with an Active Deep Sea Volcano: Vailulu'u Seamount, Samoa". Geomicrobiology Journal. 26 (8): 597–605. doi:10.1080/01490450903316174. S2CID 128549578.
- Hart, S. R.; Coetzee, M.; Workman, R. K.; Blusztajn, J.; Johnson, K. T. M.; Sinton, J. M.; Steinberger, B.; Hawkins, J. W. (30 October 2004). "Genesis of the Western Samoa seamount province: age, geochemical fingerprint and tectonics". Earth and Planetary Science Letters. 227 (1): 37–56. Bibcode:2004E&PSL.227...37H. doi:10.1016/j.epsl.2004.08.005. ISSN 0012-821X.
- Hart, S. R.; Staudigel, H.; Koppers, A. a. P.; Blusztajn, J.; Baker, E. T.; Workman, R.; Jackson, M.; Hauri, E.; Kurz, M. (2000). "Vailulu'u undersea volcano: The New Samoa". Geochemistry, Geophysics, Geosystems. 1 (12): n/a. Bibcode:2000GGG.....1.1056H. doi:10.1029/2000GC000108. ISSN 1525-2027.
- Konter, J. G.; Staudigel, H.; Hart, S. R.; Shearer, P. M. (2004). "Seafloor seismic monitoring of an active submarine volcano: Local seismicity at Vailulu'u Seamount, Samoa" (PDF). Geochemistry, Geophysics, Geosystems. 5 (6): Q06007. Bibcode:2004GGG.....5.6007K. doi:10.1029/2004GC000702. hdl:1912/454. ISSN 1525-2027.
- Koppers, Anthony; Staudigel, Hubert; Hart, Stanley; Young, Craig; Konter, Jasper (1 March 2010). "Spotlight: Vailulu'u Seamount". Oceanography. 23 (1): 164–165. doi:10.5670/oceanog.2010.80. hdl:1912/3549.
- Koppers, Anthony A. P.; Russell, Jamie A.; Roberts, Jed; Jackson, Matthew G.; Konter, Jasper G.; Wright, Dawn J.; Staudigel, Hubert; Hart, Stanley R. (July 2011). "Age systematics of two young en echelon Samoan volcanic trails". Geochemistry, Geophysics, Geosystems. 12 (7): n/a. Bibcode:2011GGG....12.7025K. doi:10.1029/2010GC003438. hdl:1912/4769. S2CID 54947952.
- Sims, Kenneth W. W.; Hart, S. R.; Reagan, M. K.; Blusztajn, J.; Staudigel, H.; Sohn, R. A.; Layne, G. D.; Ball, L. A.; Andrews, J. (2008). "238U-230Th-226Ra-210Pb-210Po, 232Th-228Ra, and 235U-231Pa constraints on the ages and petrogenesis of Vailulu'u and Malumalu Lavas, Samoa". Geochemistry, Geophysics, Geosystems. 9 (4): n/a. Bibcode:2008GGG.....9.4003S. doi:10.1029/2007GC001651. hdl:1912/3263. ISSN 1525-2027. S2CID 54637043.
- Staudigel, H.; Hart, S. R.; Koppers, A. a. P.; Constable, C.; Workman, R.; Kurz, M.; Baker, E. T. (2004). "Hydrothermal venting at Vailulu'u Seamount: The smoking end of the Samoan chain". Geochemistry, Geophysics, Geosystems. 5 (2): n/a. Bibcode:2004GGG.....5.2003S. doi:10.1029/2003GC000626. hdl:1912/460. ISSN 1525-2027. S2CID 53631888.
- Sudek, Lisa A.; Templeton, Alexis S.; Tebo, Bradley M.; Staudigel, Hubert (30 November 2009). "Microbial Ecology of Fe (hydr)oxide Mats and Basaltic Rock from Vailulu'u Seamount, American Samoa". Geomicrobiology Journal. 26 (8): 581–596. doi:10.1080/01490450903263400. S2CID 85954222.
- Workman, R. K.; Hart, S. R.; Jackson, M.; Regelous, M.; Farley, K. A.; Blusztajn, J.; Kurz, M.; Staudigel, H. (2004). "Recycled metasomatized lithosphere as the origin of the Enriched Mantle II (EM2) end-member: Evidence from the Samoan Volcanic Chain". Geochemistry, Geophysics, Geosystems. 5 (4): n/a. Bibcode:2004GGG.....5.4008W. doi:10.1029/2003GC000623. hdl:1912/462. ISSN 1525-2027. S2CID 13987904.
- Young, Craig M.; Zierenberg, Robert; Templeton, Alexis S.; Tebo, Bradley M.; Pietsch, Theodore W.; Lee, Ray; Konter, Jasper; Koppers, Anthony A. P.; Jones, Daniel (2006-04-25). "Vailulu'u Seamount, Samoa: Life and death on an active submarine volcano". Proceedings of the National Academy of Sciences. 103 (17): 6448–6453. Bibcode:2006PNAS..103.6448S. doi:10.1073/pnas.0600830103. ISSN 0027-8424. PMC 1458904. PMID 16614067.

== See also ==
- List of cities, towns and villages in Samoa
- Districts of Samoa
- Samoan Islands
- Geography of American Samoa
