= Samoan Islands =

Archipelago in the South Pacific Ocean

Coordinates: 14°16′S 171°12′W

Native name: Motu o Sāmoa
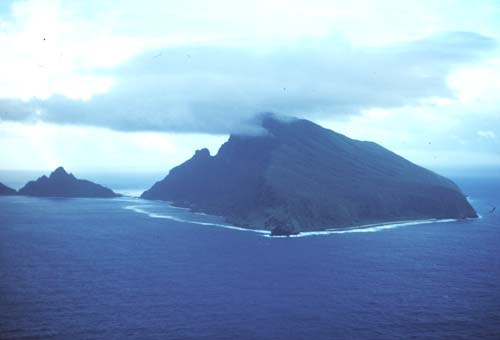
- Above: Olosega island in the Manu'a group, eastern Samoa Islands. Below: map of the Samoan Islands

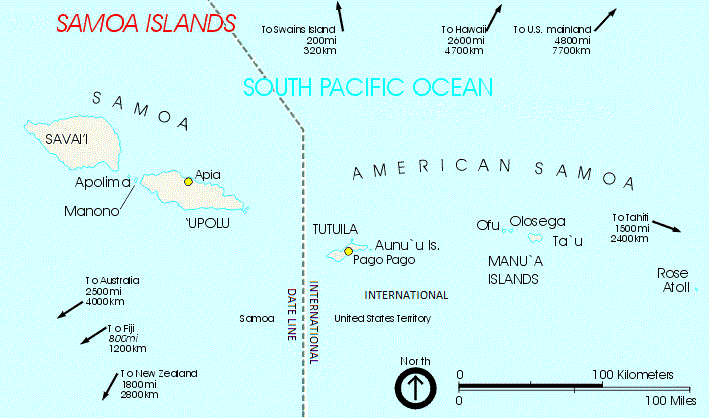

Geography
- Location: Polynesia
- Area: 3,030 km^{2} (1,170 sq mi)
- Highest elevation: 1,858 m (6096 ft)
- Highest point: Mauga Silisili

Administration
- Samoa
- Largest settlement: Apia (pop. 38,800)
- United States
- Unincorporated Territory: American Samoa
- Largest settlement: Tafuna (pop. 9,756)

Demographics
- Population: 249,839 (2012)

The Samoan Islands (Samoan: Motu o Sāmoa) are an archipelago covering 3,030 km^{2} (1,170 sq mi) in the central South Pacific, forming part of Polynesia and of the wider region of Oceania. Administratively, the archipelago comprises all of the Independent State of Samoa and most of American Samoa (apart from Swains Island, which is geographically part of the Tokelau Islands). The land masses of the two Samoan jurisdictions are separated by 64 km (40 mi; 35 nmi) of ocean at their closest points.

The population of the Samoan Islands is approximately 250,000. The inhabitants have in common the Samoan language, a culture known as fa'a Samoa, and an indigenous form of governance called fa'amatai. Samoans are one of the largest Polynesian populations in the world, and most are of exclusively Samoan ancestry.

The oldest known evidence of human activity in the Samoan Islands dates to around 1050 BC. It comes from a Lapita site at Mulifanua wharf on Upolu island. In 1768, the eastern islands were visited by the French explorer Bougainville, who named them the Navigator Islands. That name was used by missionaries until about 1845, and in official European dispatches until about 1870.

== Samoa and American Samoa ==
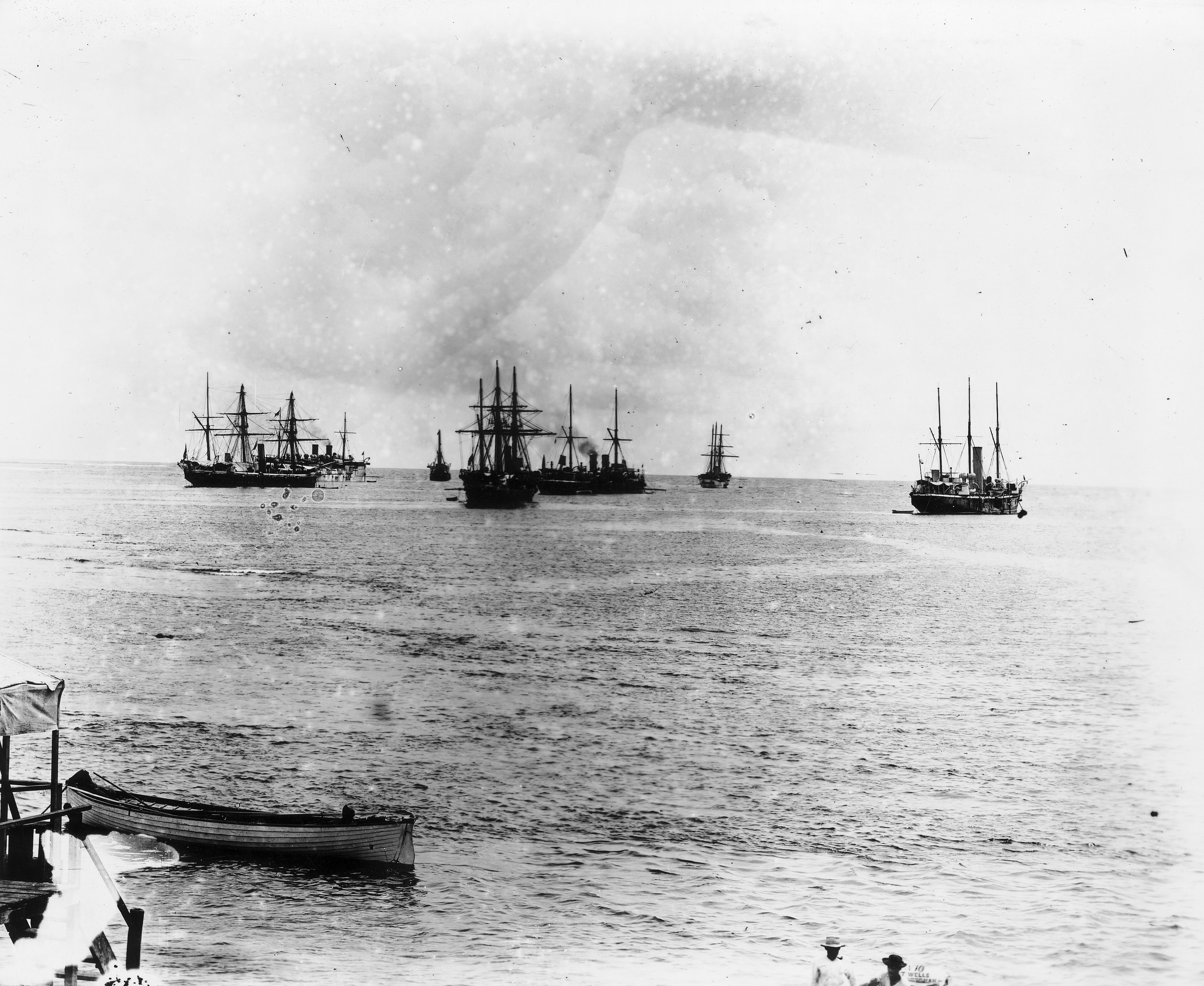
German, British and American warships in Apia harbour, 1899

Politically, the Samoan Islands are divided into two jurisdictions:

- Samoa, an independent nation that gained political independence from New Zealand in 1962. It comprises the western part of the Samoan Islands, (2,831 km^{2} (1,093 sq mi) and 196,000 inhabitants (2016)). It was known as German Samoa from 1900 to 1914, and as Western Samoa until 1997.
  - Capital: Apia; currency: Samoan tala.
- American Samoa, an unincorporated territory of the United States comprising the eastern part of the Samoan Islands. (199 km^{2} (77 sq mi) and 49,710 inhabitants (2020)).
  - Capital: Pago Pago; currency: US dollar.

=== Political partition ===
In the late 19th century, competition for political control of the islands between the United States, Germany, and the United Kingdom resulted in the December 1899 Tripartite Convention, which formally partitioned the Samoan archipelago into a German colony (German Samoa) in the western part and a United States territory (American Samoa) in the eastern part. New Zealand began occupying the western islands in World War I, while they were still a German colony and continued as an occupying force until 1920. Then, from 1920 until Samoa's independence in 1962, New Zealand governed the islands in that group under a League of Nations Class C Mandate from 1920 to 1946, and as a United Nations Trust Territory from 1946 to 1962. The force that eventually led to the political independence of the western islands in 1962 was the pro-independence Mau movement, which gained popularity across the area. The eastern islands remain a political territory of the United States.

== Islands ==
The Samoan Islands has total of 18 islands spread 3,030 km^{2} (1,170 sq mi) in a west to east direction.

=== Samoa ===
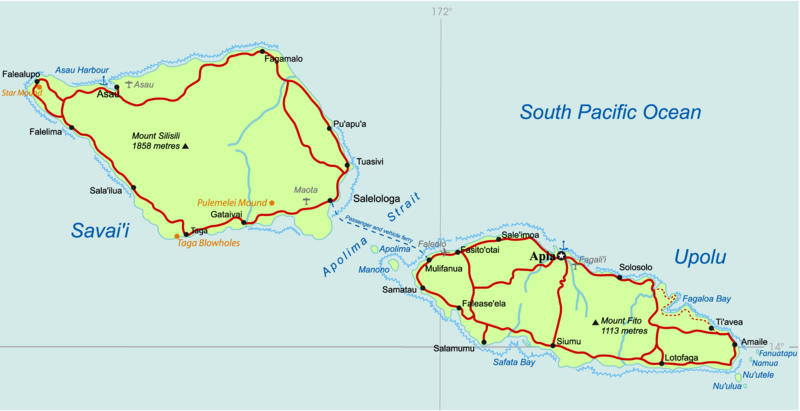
Map of Samoa

- Savaiʻi: population 43,819 (2016); largest landmass; westernmost in the group; most recent volcanic eruptions. Eruptions:Mt Matavanu (1905–1911); Mata o le Afi (1902); Mauga Afi (approximately 1725).
- Manono: population 889 (2006).
- Nuʻulopa: uninhabited; lies in the Apolima Strait between Upolu and Savaiʻi.
- Apolima: population 75 (2006).
- Upolu: population 143,418 (2011); the most populous island in the group.
- Nuʻusafeʻe: uninhabited; tiny rocky islet off the south coast of Upolu, near the village of Poutasi.
- Nuʻutele: uninhabited; volcanic tuff ring; conservation for native birds; can also be seen from the popular Lalomanu Beach.
- Nuʻulua: uninhabited; volcanic tuff ring; land area 25 hectares (62 acres); conservation habitat for endemic native birds.
- Namua: uninhabited
- Fanuatapu: uninhabited; volcanic tuff ring.

The islands of Manono, Apolima and Nuʻulopa lie in the Apolima Strait between Upolu and Savaiʻi. The four small, uninhabited islands – Nuʻutele, Nuʻulua, Namua and Fanuatapu – are situated off the east coast of Upolu and comprise the Aleipata Islands.

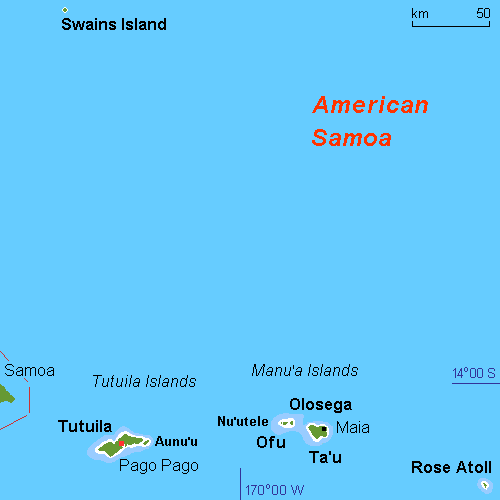
Map of American Samoa

=== American Samoa ===
- Tutuila: population 48,405 (per 2020 census); main island in the territory.
- Pola Island: unpopulated; part of the National Park of American Samoa.
- Aunu'u: population 473 (per 2020 census); located southeast of Tutuila.
- Swains Island: unpopulated (per 2020 census); politically administered by American Samoa, but culturally part of Tokelau; copra plantation.
- Ofu‑Olosega: volcanic doublet encompassing Ofu (population 132, per 2020 census) and Olosega (population 147, per 2020 census); in the Manu'a Group of islands.
- Ta'ū: population 236 (per 2020 census); largest island in the Manu'a Group
- Manu (Rose Atoll): unpopulated (per 2020 census); conservation habitat for native birdlife, marine life, green turtle and endangered hawksbill turtle.
- A number of minor uninhabited islets: Taputapu Island, Nuusetoga Island (Bartlett Island), Nuʻutele Island, Nuusilaelae Island, Pyramid Rock (Fatutoʻaga), Fatu Rock (Flowerpot Rock), Utusiva, Avaio, and Nu’upule Rock.

== Location ==
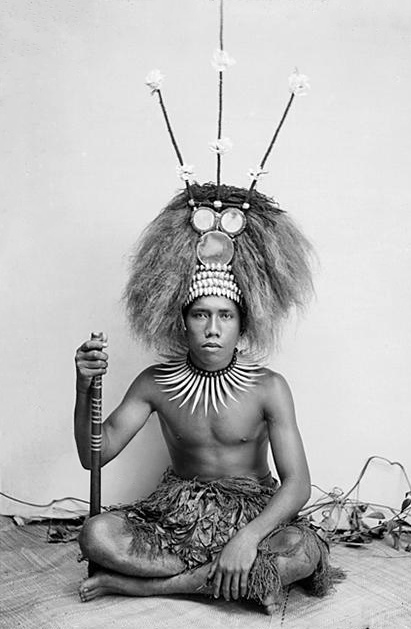
Young man dressed as a manaia, the son of a Samoan chief (matai), c. 1890–1910. (photo by Thomas Andrew)

The islands are approximately 800 km (500 mi) from Fiji, 530 km (330 mi) from Tonga, 2,900 km (1,800 mi) from New Zealand, and 4,000 km (2,500 mi) from Hawaii, U.S.

The islands lie between 13° and 14° south latitude and 169° and 173° west longitude, and span an area of about 480 km (300 mi) from west to east.

The larger islands are volcanic in origin, mountainous, and covered in tropical moist forest. Some of the smaller islands are coral atolls with black sand beaches.

== Highest points ==
The highest point in Samoa is Mt. Silisili, on the island of Savai'i. At 1,858 m (6,096 ft), it is also one of the highest peaks in Polynesia. The highest peak in American Samoa is on Ta’u, Lata Mountain, at 966 m (3,169 ft).

== Landmass ==
Upolu and Savai'i in Samoa are among the largest of the Polynesian islands, at 1,718 km^{2} (663 sq mi) and 1,125 km^{2} (434 sq mi), respectively, Their size is exceeded only by the two substantially larger main islands of New Zealand Te Waipounamu and Te Ika-a-Māui as well as Rakiura, and the two main islands of Fiji and the Hawaiian islands of Hawaiʻi and Maui. The island of Upolu has more inhabitants than the island of Savai'i does.

The next largest island is Tutuila, where the city and harbor of Pago Pago (with a population of 3,519 in 1990) is located. Tutuila is much smaller than Upolu and Savai‘i, at 136.2 km^{2} (52.6 sq mi) in area, but it is the largest island in American Samoa. The highest point on Tutuila is Matafao Peak.

Smaller islands in the archipelago include the three islets (Manono Island, Apolima and Nu'ulopa) located in the Apolima Strait between Savai'i and Upolu; the four Aleipata Islands off the eastern end of Upolu (Nu'utele, Nu'ulua, Namua, and Fanuatapu); and Nu‘usafe‘e. Aunu'u is a small island off the eastern end of Tutuila. To the east of Tutuila, the Manu'a group comprises Ofu, Olosega, and Ta’u. An uninhabited coral atoll, Rose Atoll, is the southernmost point in the territory of the United States. Another coral atoll, Swains Island, is within the territory of American Samoa but is geographically distant from the Samoan archipelago.

== Time zone ==
In 1892, the Samoan islands shifted to the eastern side of the International Date Line. The ruler Malietoa Laupepa issued a proclamation that Monday, 4 July would occur twice, giving an extra day in July 1892. This change, which occurred on the American Independence Day, was likely due to increasing trade with Americans. The islands would be on the same day as the United States.

By 2011, the government of independent Samoa decided to shift back to the western side in order to have the same day as Australia and New Zealand. Being one day behind these countries, Samoa's primary trading partners, left only four business days in a week. The shift was implemented by skipping Friday, 30 December; workers were paid for this "missed" day. Neighboring Tokelau shifted as well on this day.

== Geology ==
Diagram showing how islands are formed by hotspots

The volcanic Samoa island chain may have been formed by the activity of the Samoa hotspot at the eastern end of the Samoa Islands. In theory, that hotspot was created by the movement of the Pacific tectonic plate over a 'fixed' deep and narrow mantle plume spewing up through the Earth's crust. One piece of evidence that this activity may have created the islands is that they generally lie in a straight east-to-west line, and the plate is moving from east to west. However, some characteristics of the Samoa islands are inconsistent with this theory. The classic hotspot model (based mostly on studies of the Hawaii hotspot) predicts that, if plate movement over a hotspot is what created a volcanic island chain, then the farther away from the hotspot the islands and seamounts in the chain are, the older they will prove to be. Some of the evidence is inconsistent with this explanation for the creation of the Samoa island chain, creating an enigma for scientists.

For one thing, Savai'i, the most western of the Samoa island chain, and Ta'u Island, the most eastern, both erupted in the last century. For another thing, the subaerial rock samples initially collected from Savai'i, the westernmost of the islands, are too young by several million years to fit the classic hotspot model of age progression in an island chain. These facts led some scientists to suggest that the Samoa islands were not formed by the hotspot plume. One possible explanation for the inconsistency of the data with the hotspot formation theory is the fact that the island chain lies just north of the Tonga Trench. An alternative theory is that the islands were formed by magma seeping through cracks in stressed fracture zones. However, in 2005, an international team found new evidence that supports the hotspot model. They gathered additional samples from Savai'i – submarine samples from the deep flanks and rifts of the island. Tests found that these samples are much older than the previously collected samples: They are about five million years old, an age that fits the hotspot model.

=== 2009 Samoa earthquake and tsunami ===
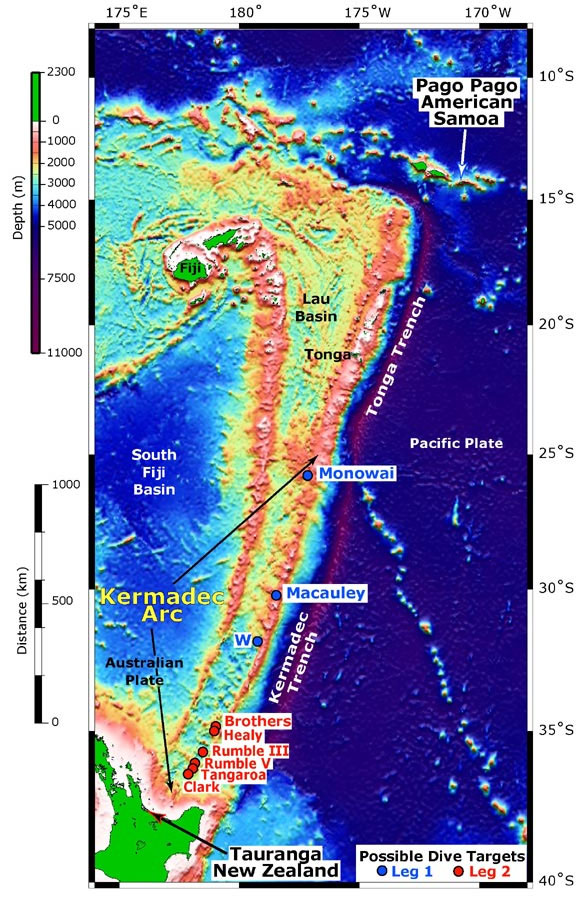
Tonga Trench south of the Samoa Islands and north of New Zealand.

The 2009 Samoa earthquake and tsunami killed more than 170 people in the Samoa Islands and Tonga. The M8.1 submarine earthquake took place in the region at 06:48:11 local time on 29 September 2009 (17:48:11 UTC, 29 September), followed by smaller aftershocks. It was the largest earthquake of 2009.

=== Vailulu'u Seamount ===
The Vailulu'u Seamount, an active submerged volcano, lies 45 km (28 mi) east of Ta'u in American Samoa. It was discovered in 1975 and has since been studied by an international team of scientists, contributing towards understanding of the Earth's fundamental processes. Growing inside the summit crater of Vailulu'u is an active underwater volcanic cone, named after Samoa's goddess of war, Nafanua.

== Climate ==
The Samoan climate is tropical, with a rainy season from November to April. The island group is frequently hit by tropical cyclones between December and March, due to its position in the South Pacific Ocean.

== Gallery ==
Samoa Islands

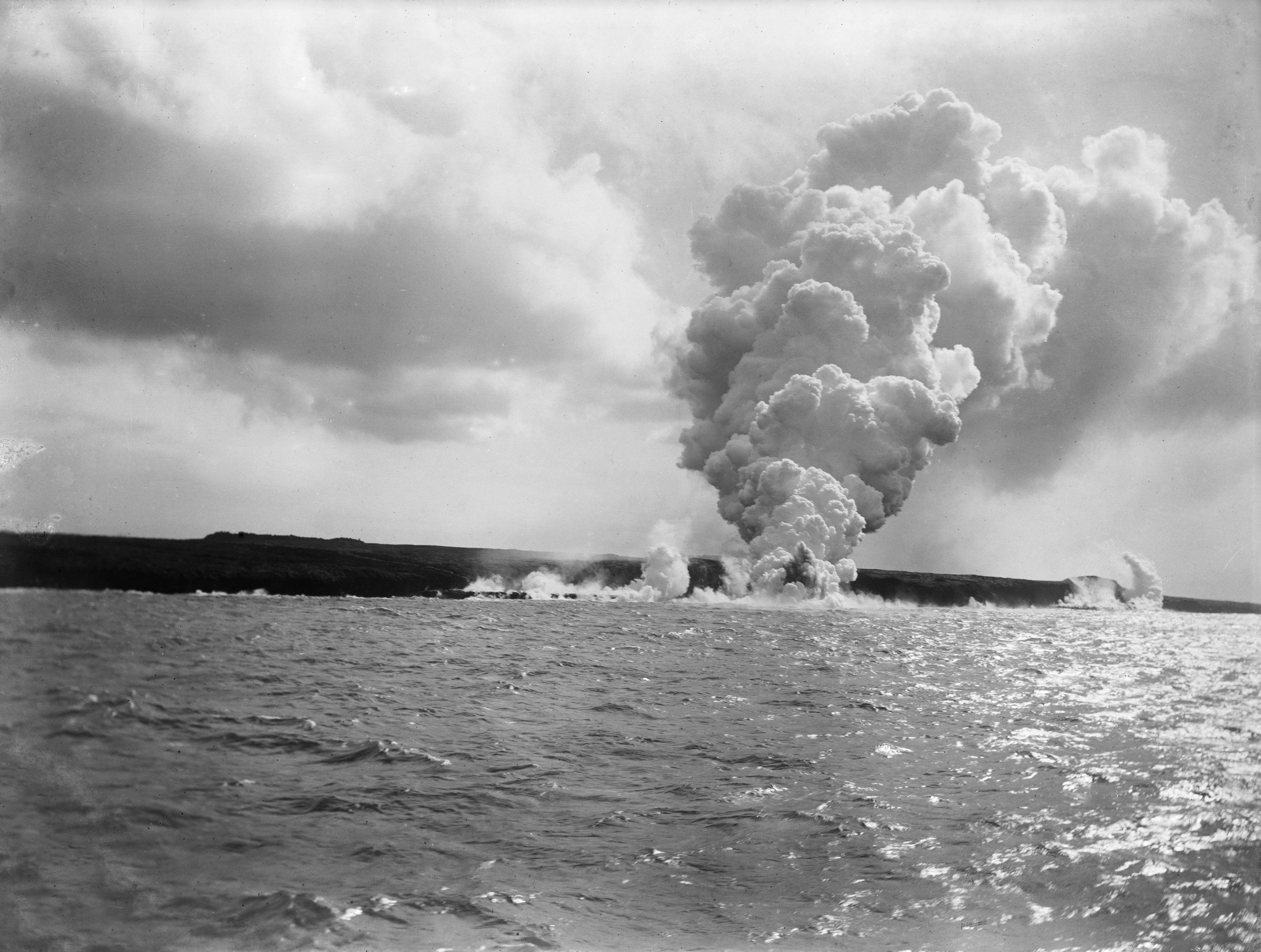
Mt Matavanu volcanic eruption on Savai'i island, 1905

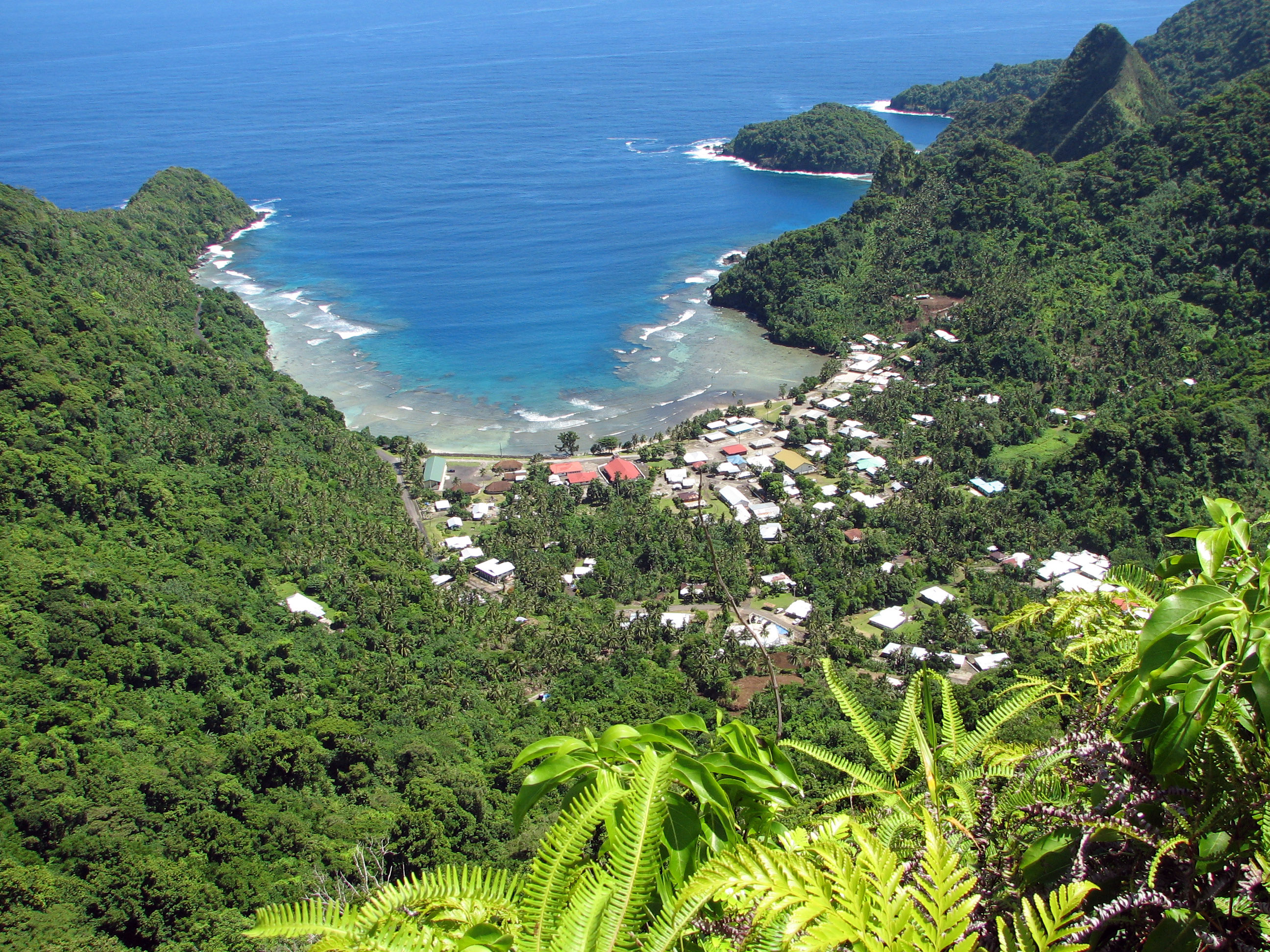
Afono village, Tutuila island, American Samoa.

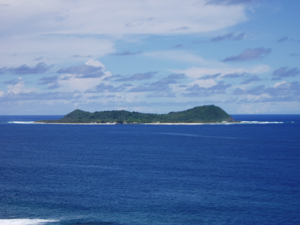
Aunu'u island, offshore of the island of Tutuila, American Samoa

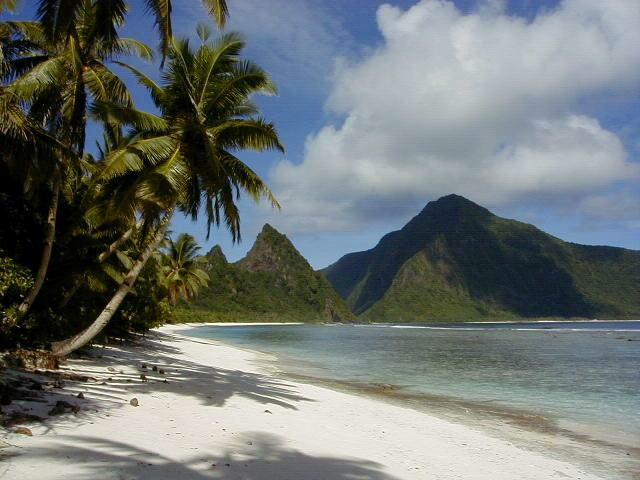
A beach on Ofu-Olosega, a volcanic doublet in the Manu'a Group of islands.

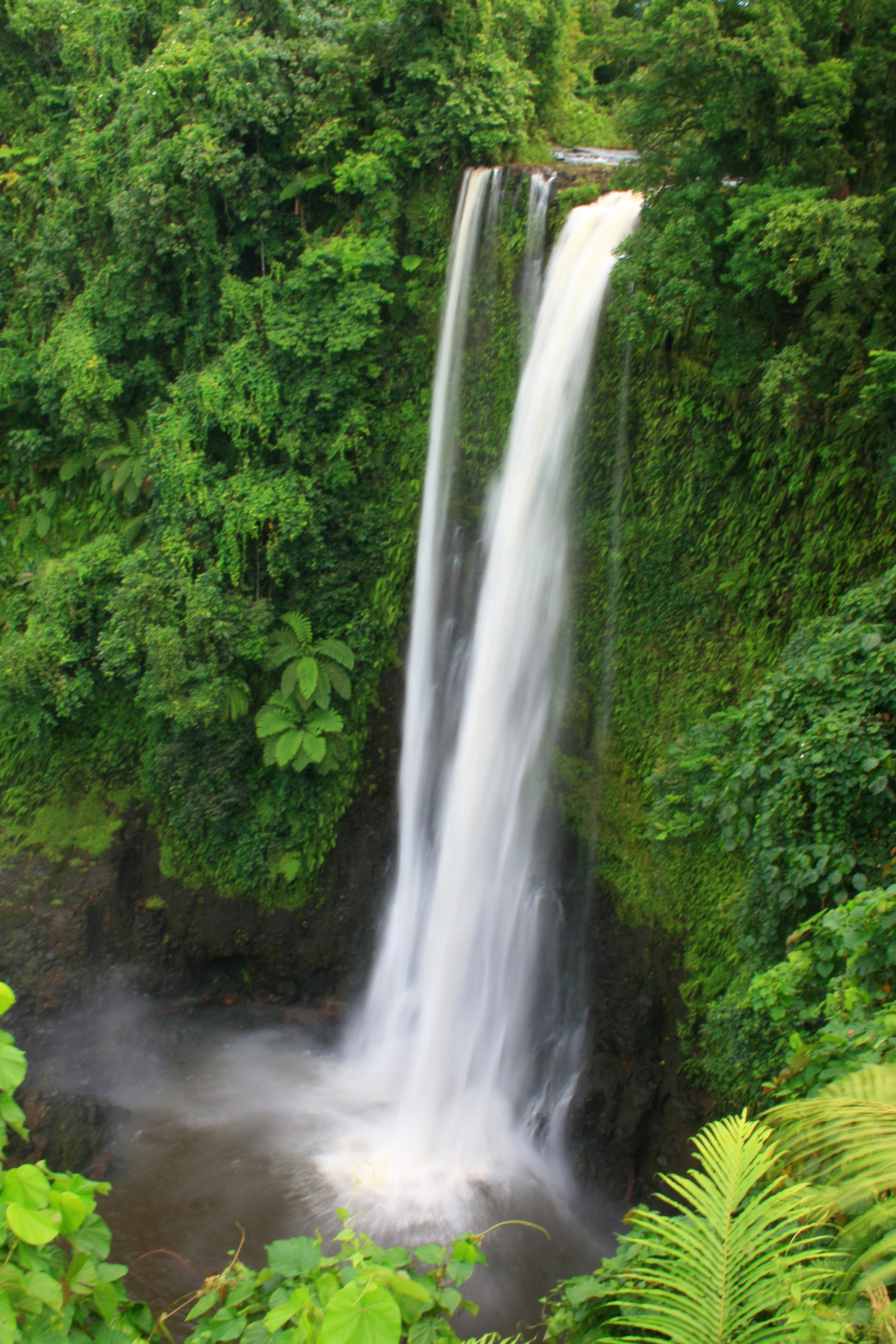
Fuipisia waterfall in Lotofaga, Upolu island.

== See also ==
- Archaeology of Samoa
- Architecture of Samoa
- Coming of Age in Samoa
- Culture of Samoa
- First Samoan Civil War
- Samoan unification
- Second Samoan Civil War
- Siege of Apia
- Tokelauan language (belongs to the group of Samoic languages, and is derived from Samoan)
- Tuvaluan language (belongs to the group of Samoic languages, and is closely related to Samoan)
- Flora of Samoa Plant species of the Samoan Islands
