= Silisili =

Mountain and highest point of Samoa

- Mount Silisili
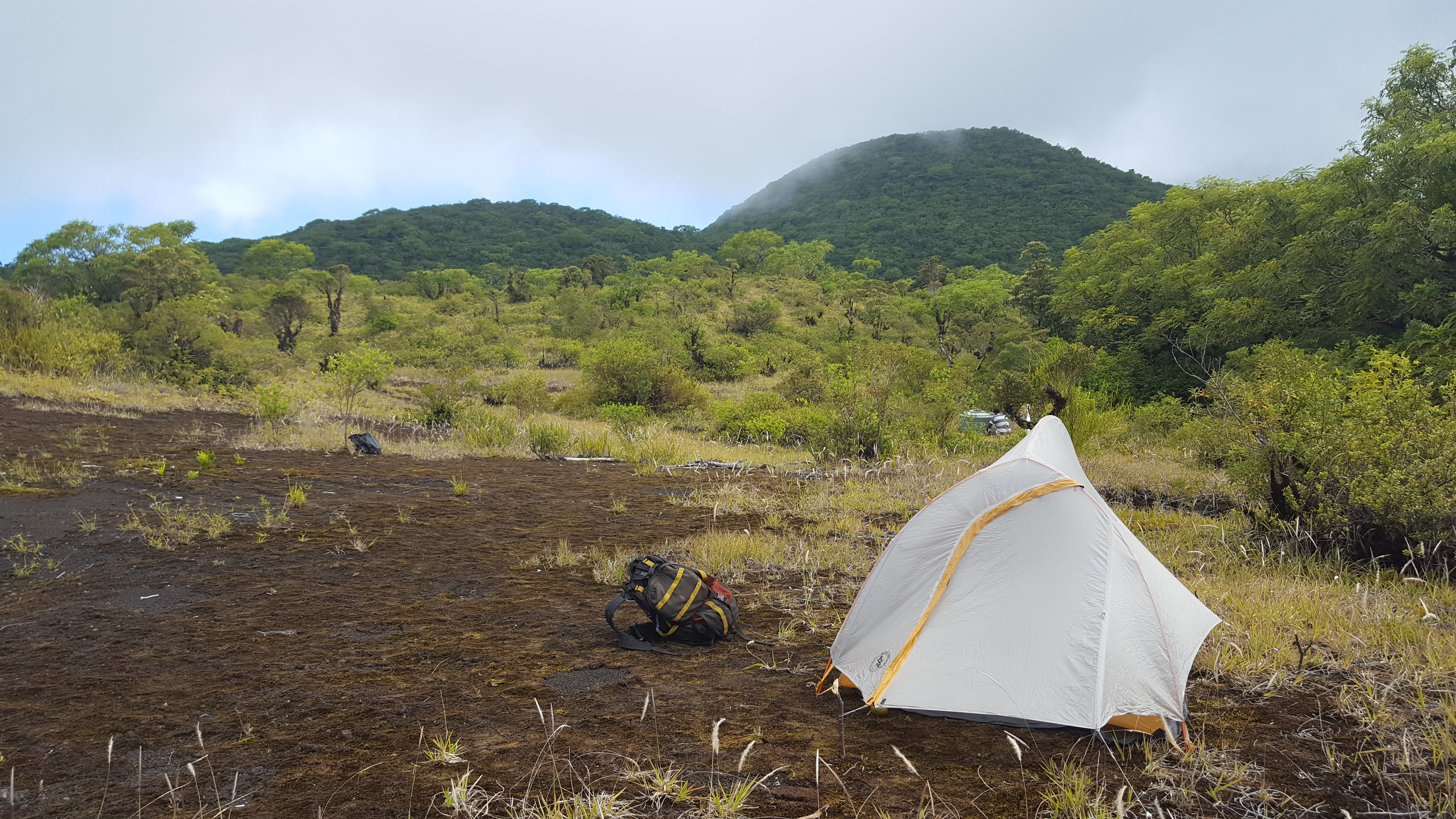
- Silisili in 2018

Highest point
- Elevation: 1,858 m (6,096 ft)
- Prominence: 1,858 m (6,096 ft)
- Listing: Country high point Ultra; Ribu
- Coordinates: 13°37′06″S 172°29′09″W

Geography
- Location within Samoa
- Location: Samoa

Mount Silisili is the highest peak in Samoa and the Samoa Islands chain. It is located in the centre of a mountain chain running the length of Savai'i island. Mount Silisili is ranked 24th by topographic isolation.

Mount Silisili rises to a height of 1,858 m. The word silisili means highest in reference to height, in the Samoan language.

Savai'i is the largest shield volcano island in the South Pacific.

== Climbing the volcano ==
Mount Silisili makes a popular hike of Savai'i island, and can be reached with a 2-day guided round-trip.

== See also ==
- Mount Matavanu, active volcano on Savai'i, last erupted 1905 - 1911.
- Mata o le Afi, a volcano on Savai'i, last erupted 30 October 1902 to 17 November 1902.
- Mauga Afi, a volcano on Savai'i, last erupted about 1725.
- List of ultras of Oceania
