= Garuga pierrei =

Scientific classification
- Kingdom: Plantae
- Clade: Tracheophytes
- Clade: Angiosperms
- Clade: Eudicots
- Clade: Rosids
- Order: Sapindales
- Family: Burseraceae
- Genus: Garuga
- Species: G. pierrei

Binomial name
- Garuga pierrei Guillaumin

Species of plant

Garuga pierrei is a tropical forest tree species in the family Burseraceae. It occurs in China and Indo-China; in Vietnam it may be called cốc đá or chua luy; no subspecies are listed in the Catalogue of Life.
