= Aleipata Islands =

Four islands in Atua District, Samoa

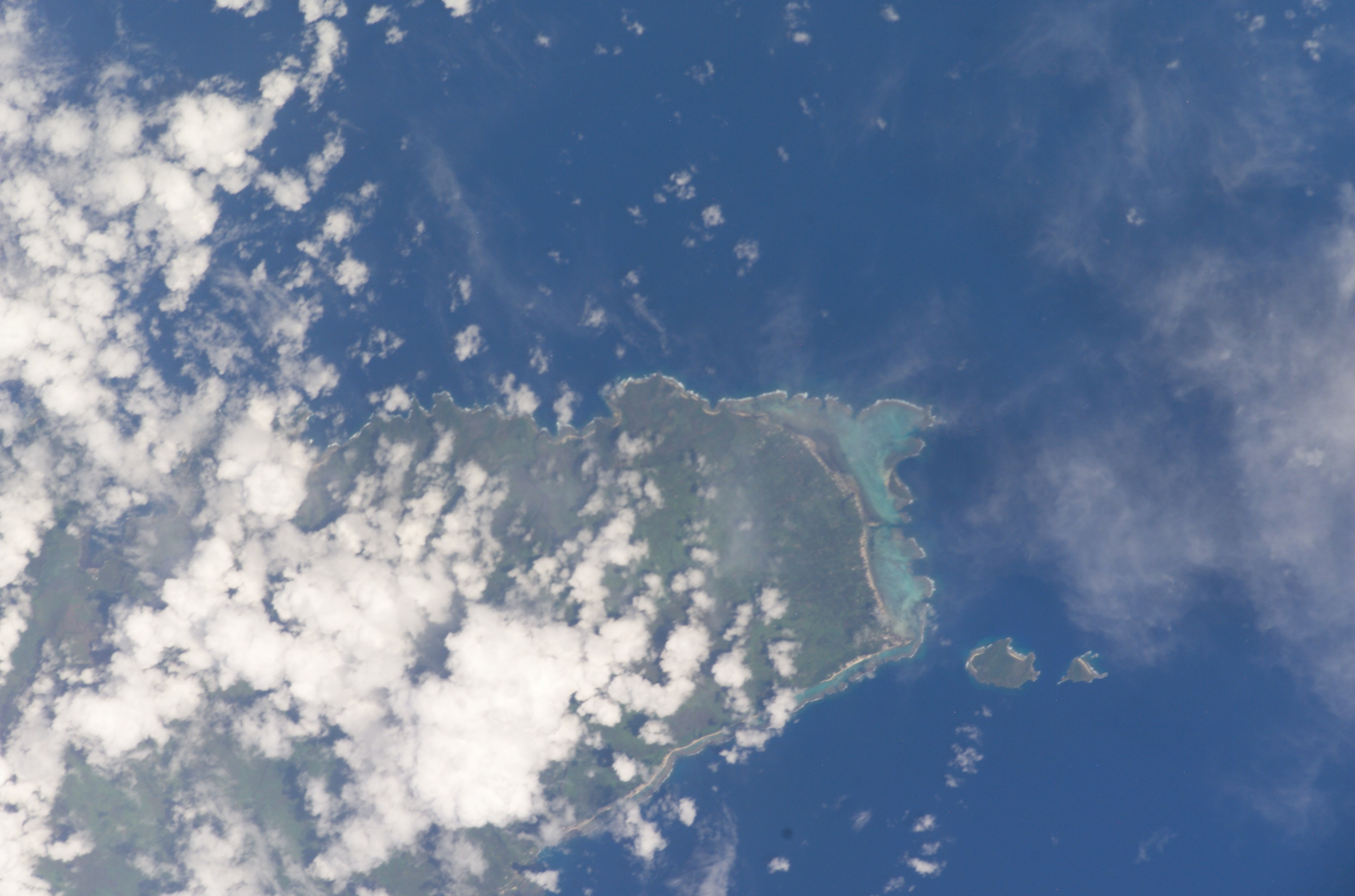
- Aleipata islands east of Upolu island (NASA)
- Interactive map of Aleipata Islands

Geography
- Coordinates: 14°04′20″S 171°24′40″W
- Area: 1.7 km^{2} (0.66 sq mi)
- Highest elevation: 180 m (590 ft)

Administration
- Samoa

Demographics
- Population: Uninhabited

The Aleipata Islands are a group of four uninhabited islands off the eastern end of Upolu Island, Samoa, in central South Pacific Ocean. The islands are eroded volcanic tuff rings, and consist of a small northern pair on Upolu's barrier reef, and a larger southern pair outside it. Collectively the islands have an area of about 1.7 km^{2} (0.66 sq mi). Administratively, the islands are part of the Atua district. The islands are important for Samoa's biodiversity and are protected by the Aleipata Marine Protected Area.

== Geography ==
From north to south, the islands consist of:

- Namua (0.20 km^{2})
- Fanuatapu (0.15 km^{2})
- Nuʻutele (1.08 km^{2})
- Nuʻulua (0.25 km^{2})

Namua and Fanuatapu lie at the outer edge of the fringing reef of Upolu, at a distance of 0.7 km and 2.5 km, respectively, from Upolu Island itself. Nuʻutele and Nuʻulua are 4 to 6 km further south, outside the fringing reef, and lie 1.4 km 3.5 km off Cape Tapaga, which is the southeastern headland of Upolu. Only Namua is open for visitors, who can enjoy the Namua Island Resort and the beaches. Fanuatapu, being the easternmost island, has a lighthouse.

== Environment ==
The islands are uninhabited and relatively undisturbed, and provide an important refuge for native plant and animal species. The northern islands are mostly bare rock and coastal forest, while the larger southern group are mostly covered by coastal and lowland forest. The islands are home to the largest population of Tongan ground doves in Samoa, as well as Coconut crabs, and provides a nesting place for critically-endangered Hawksbill sea turtles, and birds including the Samoan flycatcher and Manumean.

In 2009 an attempt was made to eradicate the introduced Polynesian rat from the southern islands using air-dropped Brodifacoum to provide a pest-free refuge. The attempt was unsuccessful, with rats being detected again in 2011.

== See also ==
- Samoan Islands
- Geography of Samoa
