= Nuʻulua =

Island in Atua District, Samoa

Coordinates: 14.0728°S 171.4106°W

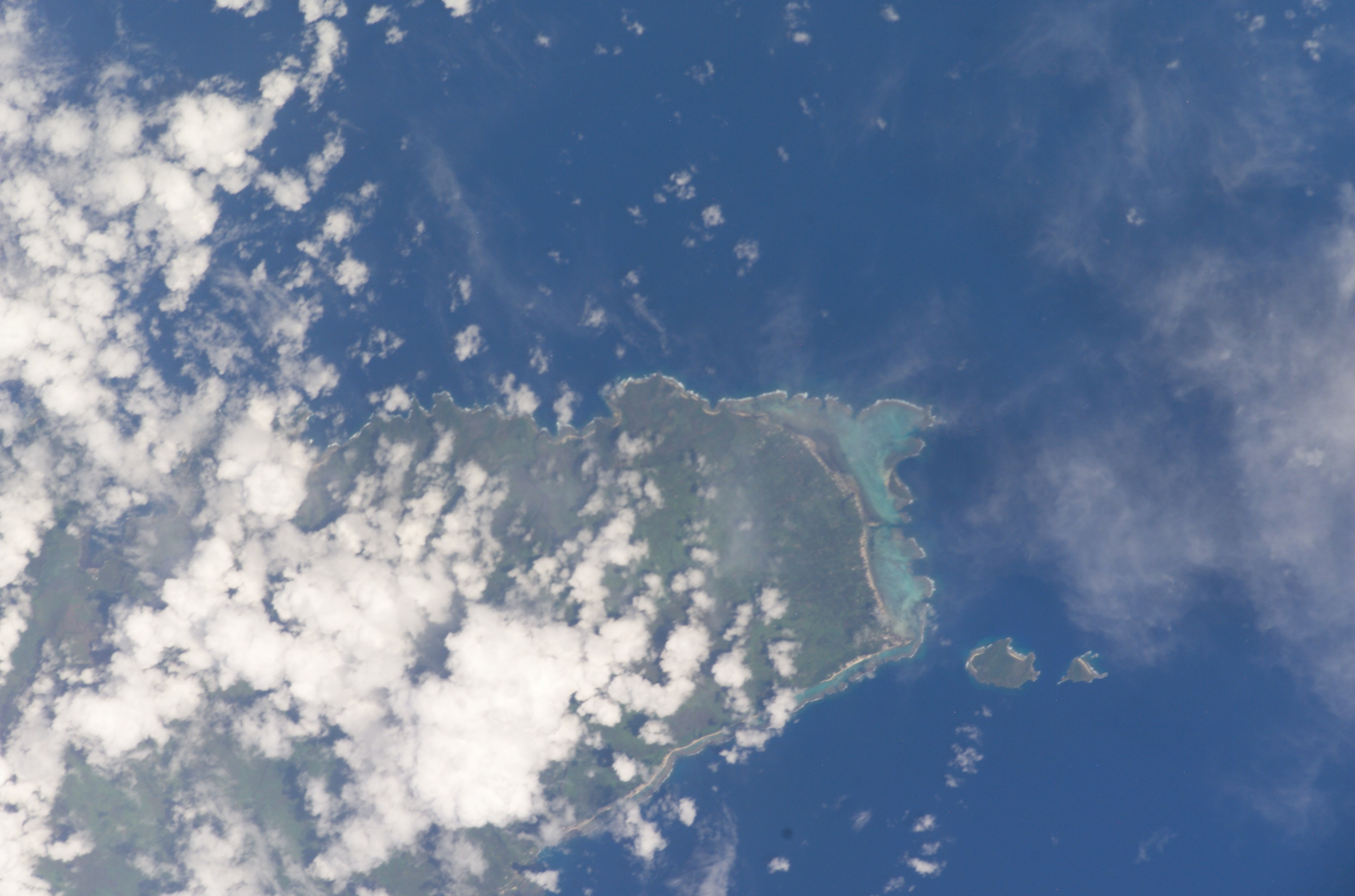
- Satellite image of the Aleipata Islands
- Interactive map of Nuʻulua

Geography
- Area: .25 km^{2} (0.097 sq mi)
- Coastline: 2.80 km (1.74 mi)

Nuʻulua is a small island in Samoa. It is the southernmost and most distant of the four Aleipata Islands, lying 3.5 km from the eastern end of Upolu. The island is part of the Atua district and the Aleiptata Itupa-I-Luga electoral constituency.

Like the other Aleipata islands, Nuʻulua is an eroded tuff cone. It has an area of 25 hectares and a maximum elevation of 100m above sea level. It has steep slopes on the north, south, and west sides, and the west side extends into a peninsula, in which there is a sea tunnel. The east part of the island has been eroded, leaving a beach.

Nuʻulua, together with neighbouring Nuʻutele, are significant conservation areas, with intact native forests and significant populations of birds. Both islands are part of the Aleipata Marine Protected Area, and are designated an Important Bird Area by BirdLife International.

The island is home to 79 species of native and naturalised plantlife. The eroded east side is covered in littoral forest, dominated by Pisonia grandis, Erythrina variegata, and Neisosperma oppositifolium.. The west side is coastal forest, dominated by Diospyros samoensis, Diospyros elliptica, Syzygium clusiifolium, Planchonella linggensis, and Garuga floribunda. The centre of the island is lowland forest, dominated by Dysoxylum samoense and Dysoxylum maota, with some Kleinhovia hospita and Hibiscus tiliaceus. Birds present include the Red-footed booby, Brown booby, Great frigatebird, Buff-banded rail, Pacific golden plover, Wandering tattler, Ruddy turnstone, Brown noddy, Atlantic white tern, Shy ground dove, Barn owl, Flat-billed kingfisher, Samoan fantail, Polynesian triller, and Samoan starling. The island also hosts six species of reptile, including Emoia cyanura, Emoia impar, Gehyra oceanica, Emoia adspersa, Ornithuroscincus noctua, and Lepidodactylus lugubris. Invasive species include the Yellow crazy ant.

In 2009 an attempt was made to eradicate the introduced Polynesian rat from Nu’utele and Nu’ulua using air-dropped Brodifacoum poison to provide a pest-free refuge. The attempt was successful on Nuʻulua, but failed on Nuʻutele, with rats being detected there again in 2011.
