= Nuʻutele =

Island in Atua District, Samoa

Coordinates: 14.063°S 171.423°W

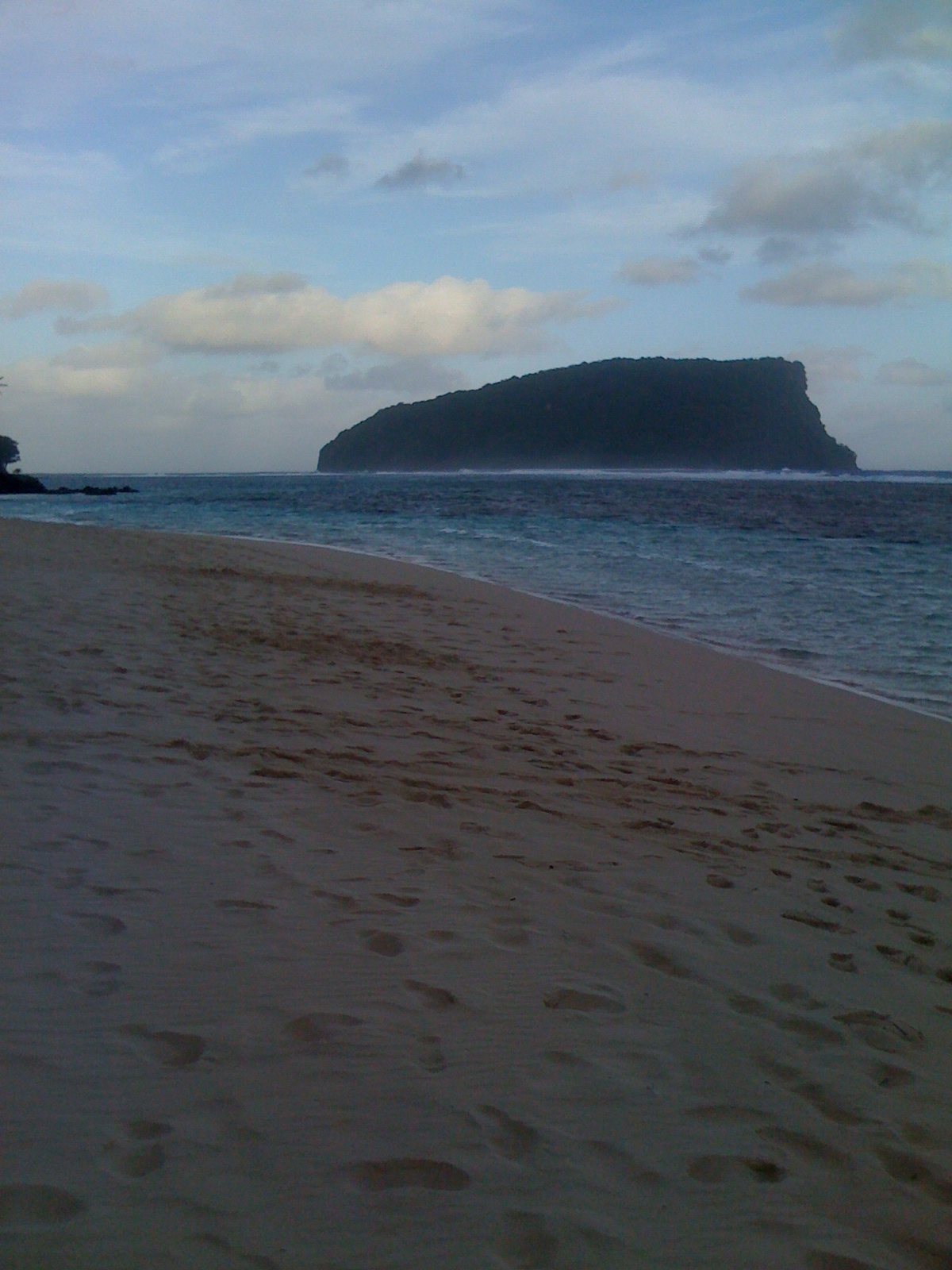
- Nuʻutele
- Interactive map of Nuʻutele

Geography
- Area: 1.08 km^{2} (0.42 sq mi)
- Coastline: 5.04 km (3.132 mi)

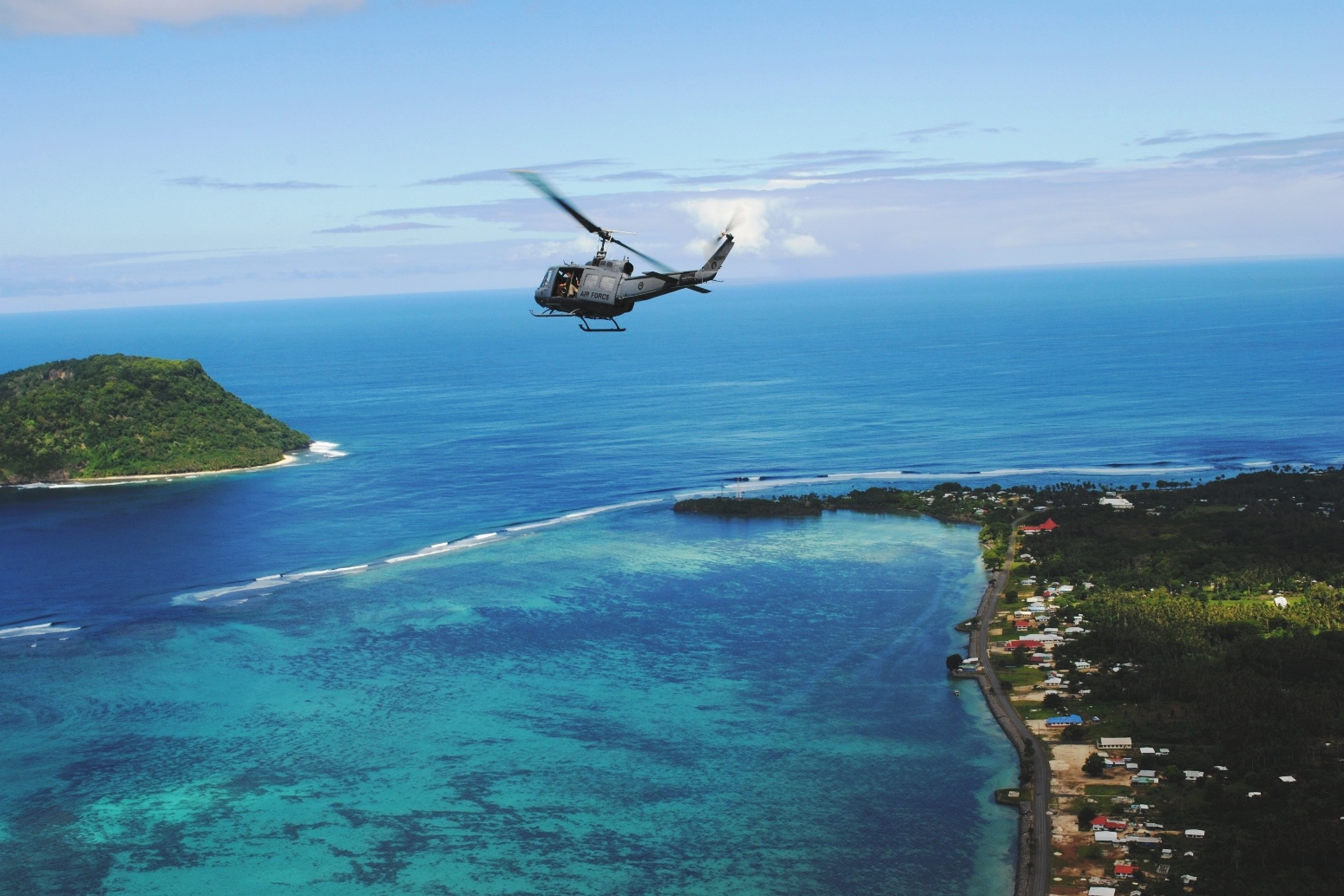
Nu'utele (left) seen from the sky

Nuʻutele is a small island in Samoa. It is the largest of the four Aleipata Islands, with an area of 1.15 km^{2} (0.44 sq mi). It lies 1.3 km off the eastern end of Upolu. Once a leper colony, the island is now a conservation area. The island is part of the Atua district and the Aleiptata Itupa-I-Luga electoral constituency.

== Geography ==
The island consists of a volcanic tuff ring with a height of 200m. It features steep terrain, with vertical marine cliffs on the north and west up to 180 m high. A breach in the crater rim on the east side forms a sheltered bay protected by a fringing reef, with a broad, flat area inland which was previously the site of the leper colony. A further flat on the West Side, known as Vini, is sometimes harvested for coconuts.

The island has an area of 1.08 square kilometers, and is 1.3km from Upolu. It is outside Upolu's reef system.

== History ==
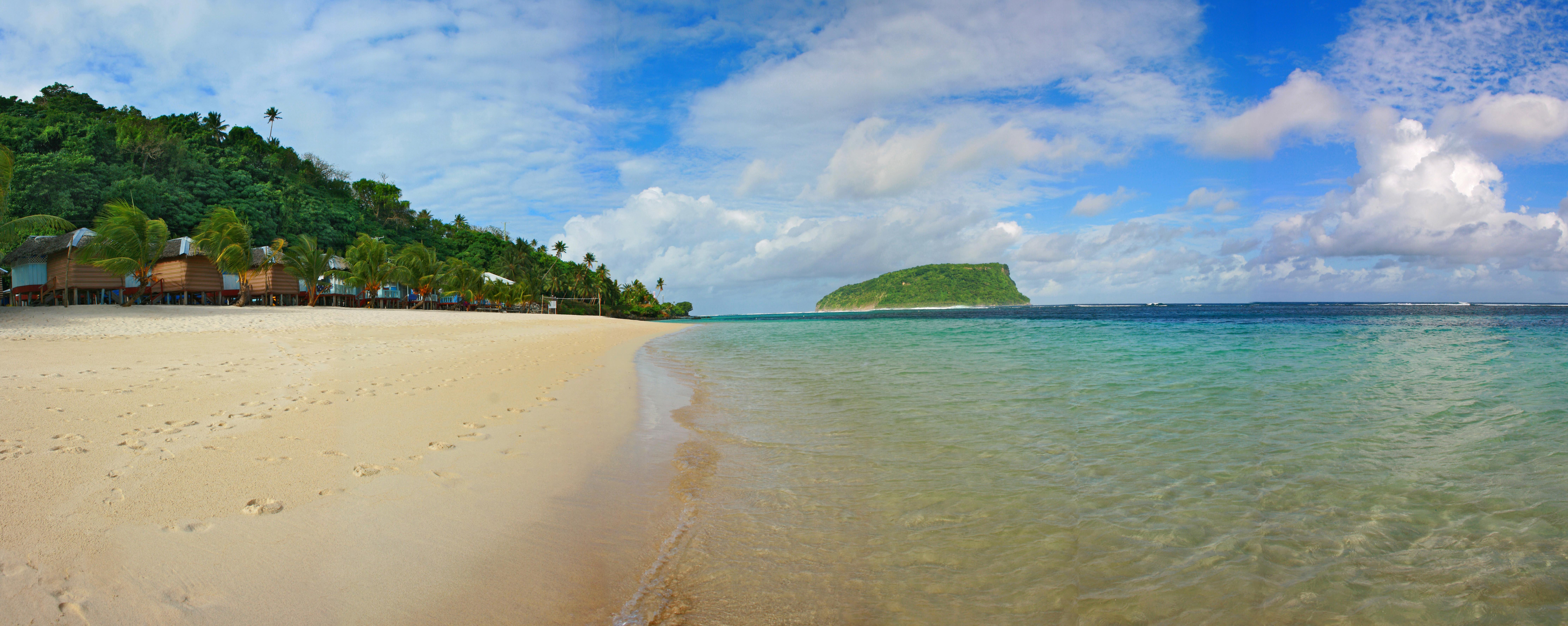
Nuʻutele island viewed from Lalomanu beach, 2007

In 1916 the island's owners gifted Nuʻutele to the New Zealand colonial administration for use as a leper colony, for use until the disease was eradicated. The colony was established in 1918, with patients moving from Samoa's existing leper colony at Alia. It lasted only a few years before the patients were transferred to Makogai in Fiji in 1922.

== Ecology and conservation ==
Nuʻutele, together with neighbouring Nuʻulua, are significant conservation areas, with intact native forests and significant populations of birds. Both islands are part of the Aleipata Marine Protected Area, and are designated an Important Bird Area by BirdLife International.

The island is home to 153 species of native and naturalised plantlife. Its outside rim is covered mainly by coastal forest, dominated by Diospyros samoensis, Diospyros elliptica, Syzygium clusiifolium, Planchonella linggensis, and Garuga floribunda. There is a large area of coconut plantation in the Northeast. The interior of the island consists of lowland forest, dominated by Dysoxylum samoense and Dysoxylum maota, with some Kleinhovia hospita and Hibiscus tiliaceus. It is also home to 12 species of land bird, including the Polynesian wattled honeyeater, Samoan starling, Polynesian triller, Crimson-crowned fruit dove, Samoan whistler, Pacific imperial pigeon, Samoan flycatcher, White-rumped swiftlet, Cardinal myzomela, Manumea, Shy ground dove, and Polynesian starling. Other birds include the Flat-billed kingfisher and Barn owl. Seabirds include the Red-footed booby, Great frigatebird, Blue noddy, Brown noddy, and White tern. The island is also home to nine species of reptile, including Emoia nigra, Emoia cyanura, Emoia samoensis, Gehyra oceanica, Emoia tongana, Lepidodactylus lugubris, Nactus pelagicus, Candoia bibroni, and Ornithuroscincus noctua.

In 2009 an attempt was made to eradicate the introduced Polynesian rat from Nu’utele and Nu’ulua using air-dropped Brodifacoum poison to provide a pest-free refuge. The attempt was successful on Nuʻulua, but failed on Nuʻutele, with rats being detected there again in 2011.

A second effort at restoration, involving the eradication of rats and feral pigs, began in 2024. Following community consultations, feral pigs were eradicated by hunting, followed by a rat-eradication campaign using air-dropped Brodifacoum in August 2025. A followup survey in 2026 found significant recovery in forest and bird life. The Samoan government plans to translocate a population of endangered Mao to the island.
