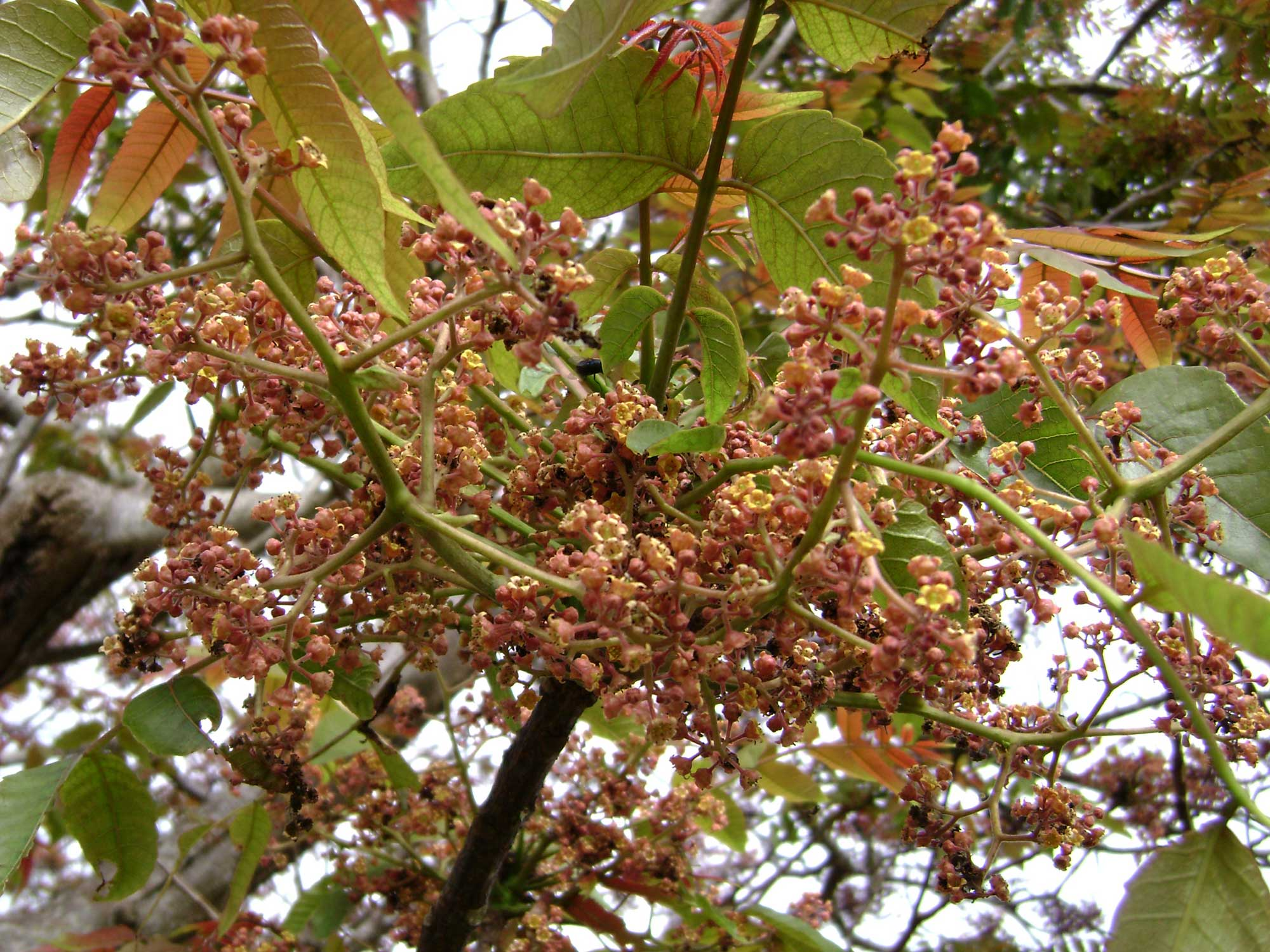
- Garuga floribunda in flower

Scientific classification
- Kingdom: Plantae
- Clade: Tracheophytes
- Clade: Angiosperms
- Clade: Eudicots
- Clade: Rosids
- Order: Sapindales
- Family: Burseraceae
- Genus: Garuga; Roxb.

Species
- See text

= Garuga =

Genus of flowering plants

Garuga is a genus of shrubs and trees in the incense or torchwood family Burseraceae. Its members are found from India to the southwest Pacific.

== Description ==
Garuga species are deciduous trees. The flowers are bisexual. The fruits are drupes (i.e. with a pit).

== Distribution and habitat ==
The native range of the group is India, continental Southeast Asia, Malesia, northern Australia and Melanesia. Their habitat is lowland forest from sea-level to 400 m (1,300 ft) altitude.

== Species ==
As of November 2023 Plants of the World Online recognises 4 species and one infraspecific name:

- Garuga floribunda Decne. - two subspecies recognised:
  - G. floribunda var. floribunda - Thailand to southwestern Pacific
  - G. floribunda var. gamblei (King ex W.W.Sm.) Kalkman - Himalayas to China
- Garuga forrestii W.W.Sm.
- Garuga pierrei Guillaumin - China to Indo-China
- Garuga pinnata Roxb. India, Indo-China, China
