= Fanuatapu =

Island in Atua District, Samoa

Coordinates: 14°00′50″S 171°24′1″W

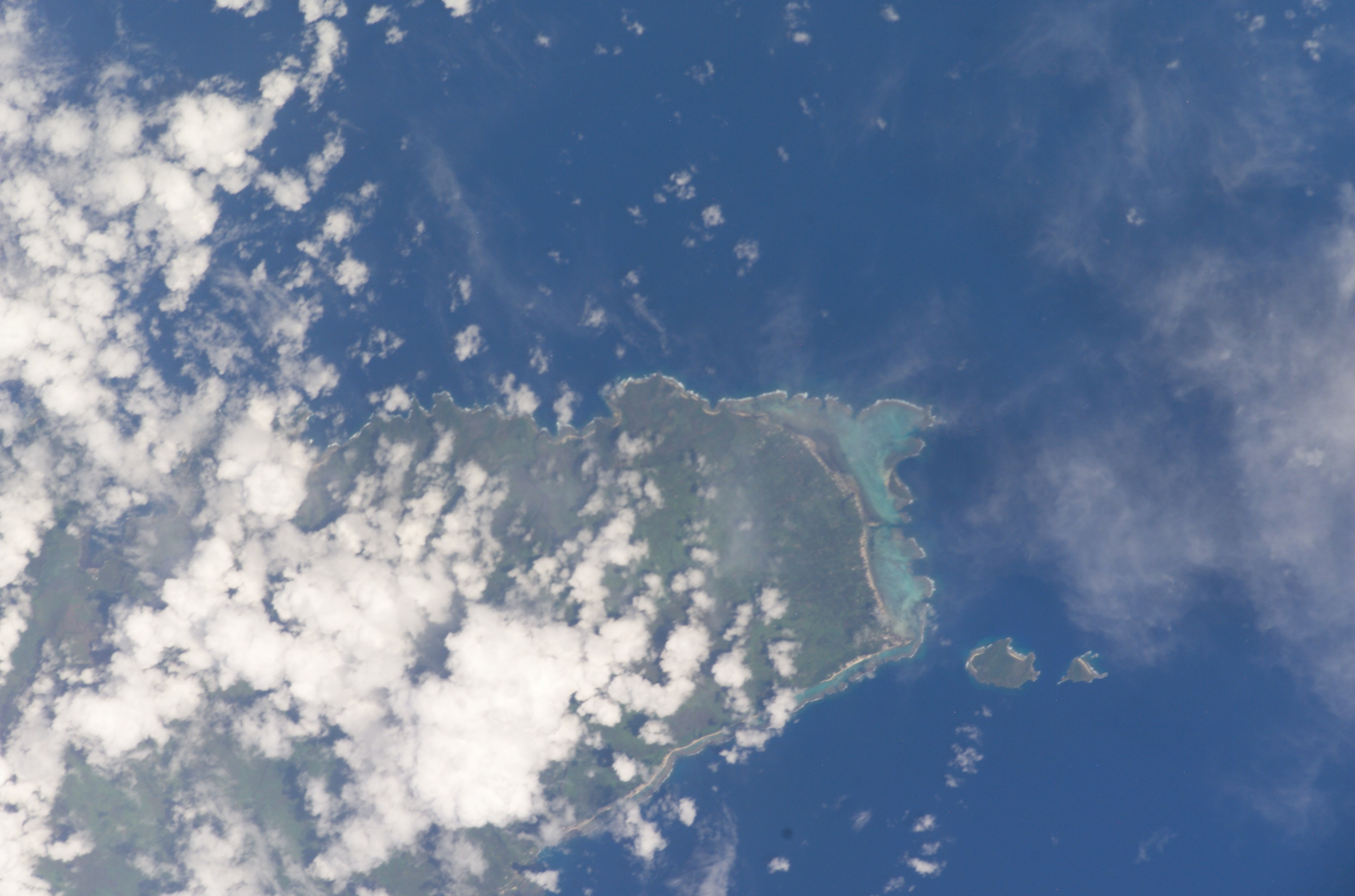
- Satellite image of the Aleipata Islands
- Interactive map of Fanuatapu

Geography
- Area: 0.15 km^{2} (0.058 sq mi)
- Coastline: 1.79 km (1.112 mi)

Fanuatapu is an uninhabited island off the eastern tip of Upolu in Samoa. It is the smallest and easternmost of the four Aleipata Islands. The island is part of the Atua district and the Aleiptata Itupa-I-Lalo electoral constituency.

The island is a steep and rocky crescent, with an area of 15 hectares and a maximum elevation of 50m. It is 2.5km offshore. The only landing site is on the west side, facing Upolu.

An automated lighthouse was installed on the island in 1926.

The island is home to 57 species of native and naturalised plantlife. The majority is coastal forest, dominated by Diospyros samoensis, Diospyros elliptica, Syzygium clusiifolium, Planchonella linggensis, and Garuga floribunda. There is a small area of coconut plantation in the north. The central part is covered by littoral forest, dominated by Barringtonia, while the rocky southern peninsula is littoral shrubland, dominated by Wedelia biflora, Scaevola taccada, and Ficus scabra.. It is also home to four species of native ground birds, including the Polynesian wattled honeyeater, Samoan starling, Flat-billed kingfisher, and Buff-banded rail. The island is also home to four species of reptile, including Emoia nigra, Emoia cyanura, and Lepidodactylus lugubris.

The island is part of the Aleipata Marine Protected Area, which is designated an Important Bird Area by BirdLife International.
