= Namua =

Island in Atua District, Samoa

Namuʻa Island
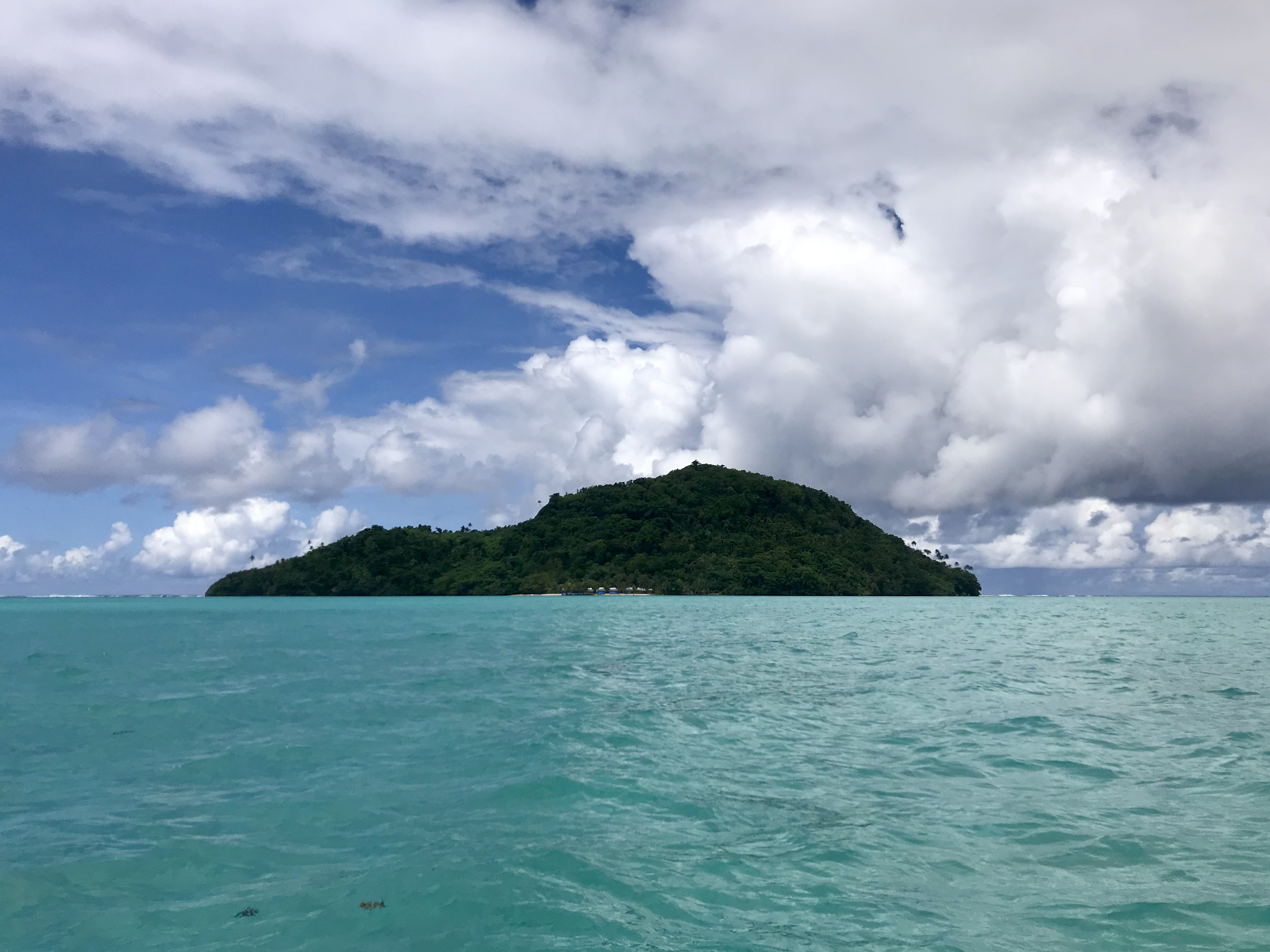
- Interactive map of Namuʻa Island

Geography
- Location: Samoa
- Coordinates: 14°01′S 171°25′W
- Area: .18 km^{2} (0.069 sq mi)
- Coastline: 2.1 km (1.3 mi)

Administration
- Samoa
- District: Atua

Demographics
- Population: 0

Additional information
- Time zone: WST (UTC+13)
  - Summer (DST): WST (UTC+14)

Namuʻa is a small, uninhabited island off the east coast of Upolu island in Samoa. It is one of four small islands in the Aleipata Islands grouping. The island is part of the Atua district and the Aleiptata Itupa-I-Lalo electoral constituency.

== Geography ==
The island is a volcanic remnant, with an area of 0.18 square kilometres and a maximum elevation of 70m. The terrain is steep, with steep slopes on the west side and cliffs on the east, but there is a sandy beach on the west side. While previously inhabited, the island now has no permanent inhabitants, with only temporary tourist accomodation.

The island is a 10-minute boat ride from Upolu Island, and has beach fale accommodation for visitors. There are several scenic lookout points, and it takes about an hour to walk around the island.

== Ownership ==
The island was originally the customary land of the Tu’isila ʻAiga. In 1873 it was leased to three Europeans. Following a dispute over ownership in 1895, Tu’isila occupied the island, and the German colonial administration awarded its ownership to William Laban, the heir of one of the original leasees. Tu’isila refused to relinquish control of the island, and in December 1895 the colonial administration sent the cruiser SMS Bussard to remove him and enforce Laban's possession. In 1913 Laban offered the island for sale.

Following the Occupation of German Samoa the island somehow passed into the hands of the New Zealand colonial administration, and then to the Samoan government. The government's ownership was upheld by a court ruling in 2024.

== Ecology ==
The island is home to 129 species of native and naturalised plantlife. Its sandy western edge is covered by littoral shrubland, dominated by Wedelia biflora, Scaevola taccada, and Ficus scabra. The slopes of the island are coastal forest, dominated by Diospyros samoensis, Diospyros elliptica, Syzygium clusiifolium, Planchonella linggensis, and Garuga floribunda.

It is also home to seven species of native land bird, including the Polynesian wattled honeyeater, Samoan starling, Polynesian triller, Flat-billed kingfisher, Crimson-crowned fruit dove, Samoan fantail, and Polynesian starling. Introduced chickens are also present.

The island is part of the Aleipata Marine Protected Area, which is designated an Important Bird Area by BirdLife International.
