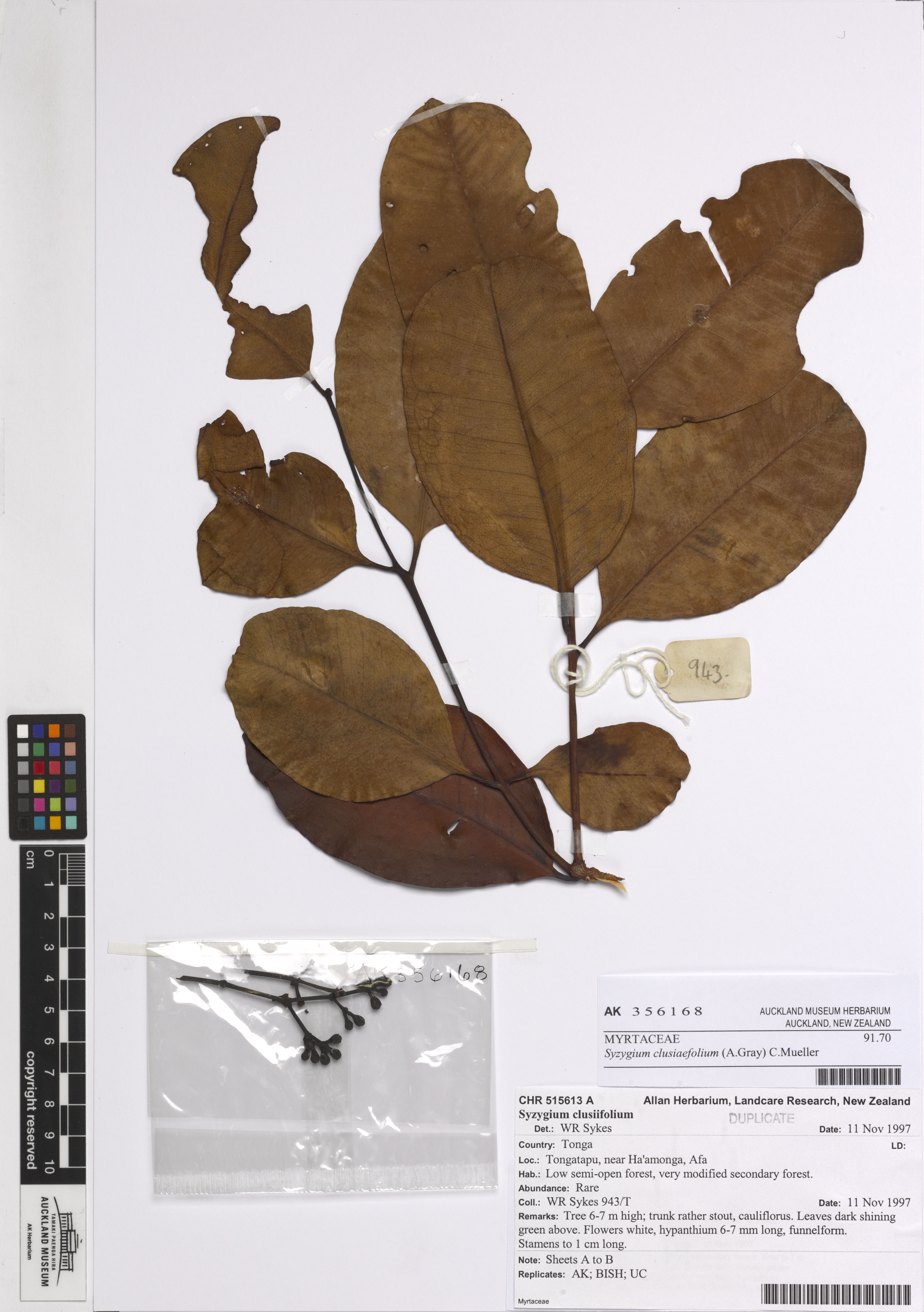

Conservation status
- Least Concern (IUCN 3.1)

Scientific classification
- Kingdom: Plantae
- Clade: Tracheophytes
- Clade: Angiosperms
- Clade: Eudicots
- Clade: Rosids
- Order: Myrtales
- Family: Myrtaceae
- Genus: Syzygium
- Species: S. clusiifolium

Binomial name
- Syzygium clusiifolium (A.Gray) Müll.Berol. (1858)

Synonyms
- Eugenia clusiifolia A.Gray (1854); Syzygium neepau Guillaumin (1931)

= Syzygium clusiifolium =

Species of flowering plant

Syzygium clusiifolium is a species of flowering plant in the myrtle family, Myrtaceae. It is a tree native to Niue, the Samoan Islands, Tonga, Vanuatu, and Wallis and Futuna. In Vanuatu it is found on Malakula, Paama, Pentecost, Espiritu Santo, Efate, Aneityum, Aniwa, Tanna, and Hiu.

It is a small to medium-sized tree growing up to 20 meters tall. It has red fruits.

It grows mostly in littoral coastal forest and lowland rainforests, in primary forest, secondary forest, and disturbed areas, up to 300 meters elevation. In the Samoan Islands it also grows on offshore tuff cone volcanic islets.

The fruits are eaten and their seeds dispersed by the Pacific imperial pigeon (Ducula pacifica), and by flying foxes (Pteropus sp.). Fruits are also consumed by introduced rats, which may limit the natural regeneration of the species.
