= Mata o le Afi =

Volcano in Samoa

- Location within Samoa

Highest point
- Elevation: 1,647 m (5,404 ft)
- Coordinates: 13.6087°S 172.5076°W

Geology
- Last eruption: 1902

Mata o le Afi ("Eye of the Fire" or "Source of the Fire") is an active volcano on the island of Savai'i in Samoa. It last erupted in 1902.

== 1902 eruption ==
An eruption began on 30 October 1902. It was preceded by a series of thirteen earthquakes, which damaged stone churches at Safune and Sasina and destroyed the church at Paia. The inhabitants of these villages and of Aopo fled. On 8 November Dr Otto Tetens examined the volcano, finding a crater a hundred yards across emitting smoke and rocks, with a second crater two miles to the north where the eruption had finished. The eruption had already begun to die down, and ceased around 17 November.
