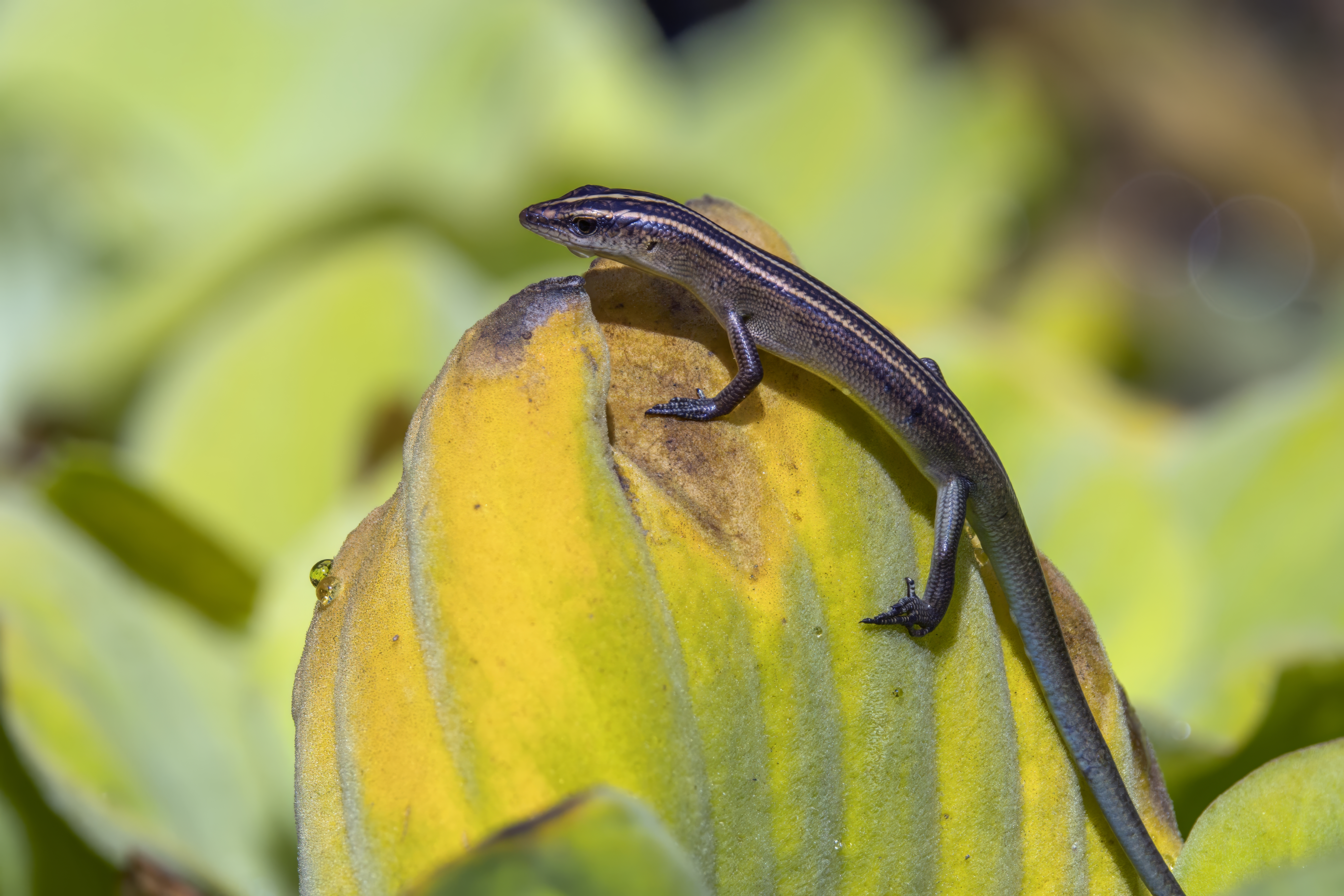
- Rarotonga, Cook Islands

Conservation status
- Least Concern (IUCN 3.1)

Scientific classification
- Domain: Eukaryota
- Kingdom: Animalia
- Phylum: Chordata
- Class: Reptilia
- Order: Squamata
- Family: Scincidae
- Genus: Emoia
- Species: E. cyanura

Binomial name
- Emoia cyanura (Lesson, 1830)

= Emoia cyanura =

Species of lizard

Emoia cyanura, the copper-tailed skink, is a species of skink. It is found in Borneo, Clipperton Island and other South Pacific islands.

== Names ==
It is known as kagisi in the Rennellese language of the Solomon Islands.
