= Mauga Afi =

Mountain in Samoa

- Location within Samoa

Highest point
- Elevation: 1,847 m (6,060 ft)
- Coordinates: 13°34′S 172°29′W

Geography
- Location: Gagaʻifomauga, Samoa

Mauga Afi ("Burning Mountain" or "Mountain of Fire") is a volcanic mountain located in the Gagaʻifomauga district on the island of Savai'i in Samoa, with an elevation of 1,847 m.

The most recent eruption occurred around 1768 and was observed by Louis Antoine de Bougainville while sailing past Savai'i. Lava from this eruption covered large areas of the north coast of Savai'i.
