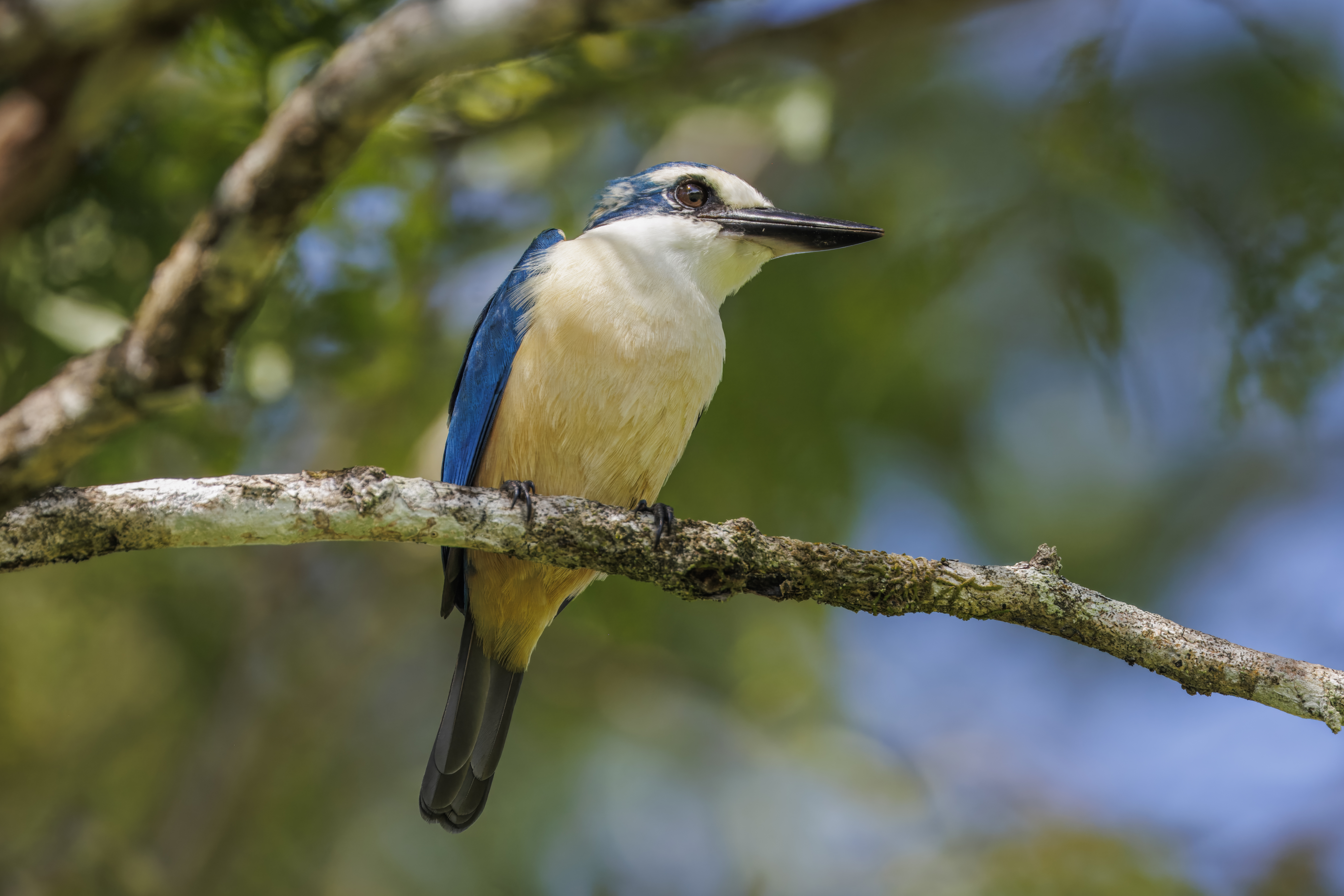
- Upolu, Samoa

Conservation status
- Least Concern (IUCN 3.1)

Scientific classification
- Kingdom: Animalia
- Phylum: Chordata
- Class: Aves
- Order: Coraciiformes
- Family: Alcedinidae
- Subfamily: Halcyoninae
- Genus: Todiramphus
- Species: T. recurvirostris

Binomial name
- Todiramphus recurvirostris Lafresnaye, 1842

Synonyms
- Halcyon recurvirostris (Lafresnaye, 1842); Todirhamphus sancta recurvirostris Lafresnaye, 1842; Alcedo cyanea recurvirostris (Lafresnaye, 1842); Halcyon sancta recurvirostris (Lafresnaye, 1842)

= Flat-billed kingfisher =

Species of bird

The flat-billed kingfisher (Todiramphus recurvirostris) is a species of bird in the family Alcedinidae, the kingfishers. This kingfisher is endemic to Samoa.

== Taxonomy ==
The flat-billed kingfisher was first formally described in 1842 by the French ornithologist Frédéric de Lafresnaye with its type locality given as In insulis maris Australis, i.e. Samoa. This species is classified within the genus Todirhamphus which is placed in the subfamily Halcyoninae, the tree kingfishers, of the kingfisher family Alcedinidae. This species was previously regarded as a subspecies of the widepsread sacred kingfisher (T. sancta).

== Distribution ==
The flat-billed kingfisher is endemic to Samoa where it is found on the islands of Upolu and Savai'i in lowland and coastal areas. They were not found in upland forests above 1,200m, most likely because food items become increasingly scarce with increased elevation.

== Description ==
The flat-billed kingfisher is a compact bird characterized by a comparatively short, shallow, and wide bill. It features deep blue wings, a greenish-blue back, and a blue cap. A distinct buffy-white patch is located in front of the eye, which narrows above it to form an eyebrow. Its underparts exhibit a cinnamon wash. The species produces a vocalization consisting of a series of short, sharp "kik" notes.

== Lifespan ==
The flat-billed kingfisher has a typical lifespan of approximately 6 to 10 years. This lifespan is comparable to related small-to-medium alcedinid species, such as the common kingfisher (Alcedo atthis), which typically lives between 7 and 10 years. In contrast, larger family members like the laughing kookaburra (Dacelo novaeguineae) can exceed 15 years of age.

== Ecology ==
The flat-billed kingfisher, like other species of kingfishers, eats a variety of different food sources. However, they appear to be somewhat reliant on large insects and reptiles as part of their diet. The falt-billed kingfisher, like other tree kingfishers, is territorial with both the male and female defending the territory. These kingfishers excavate nest cavities in trees.
