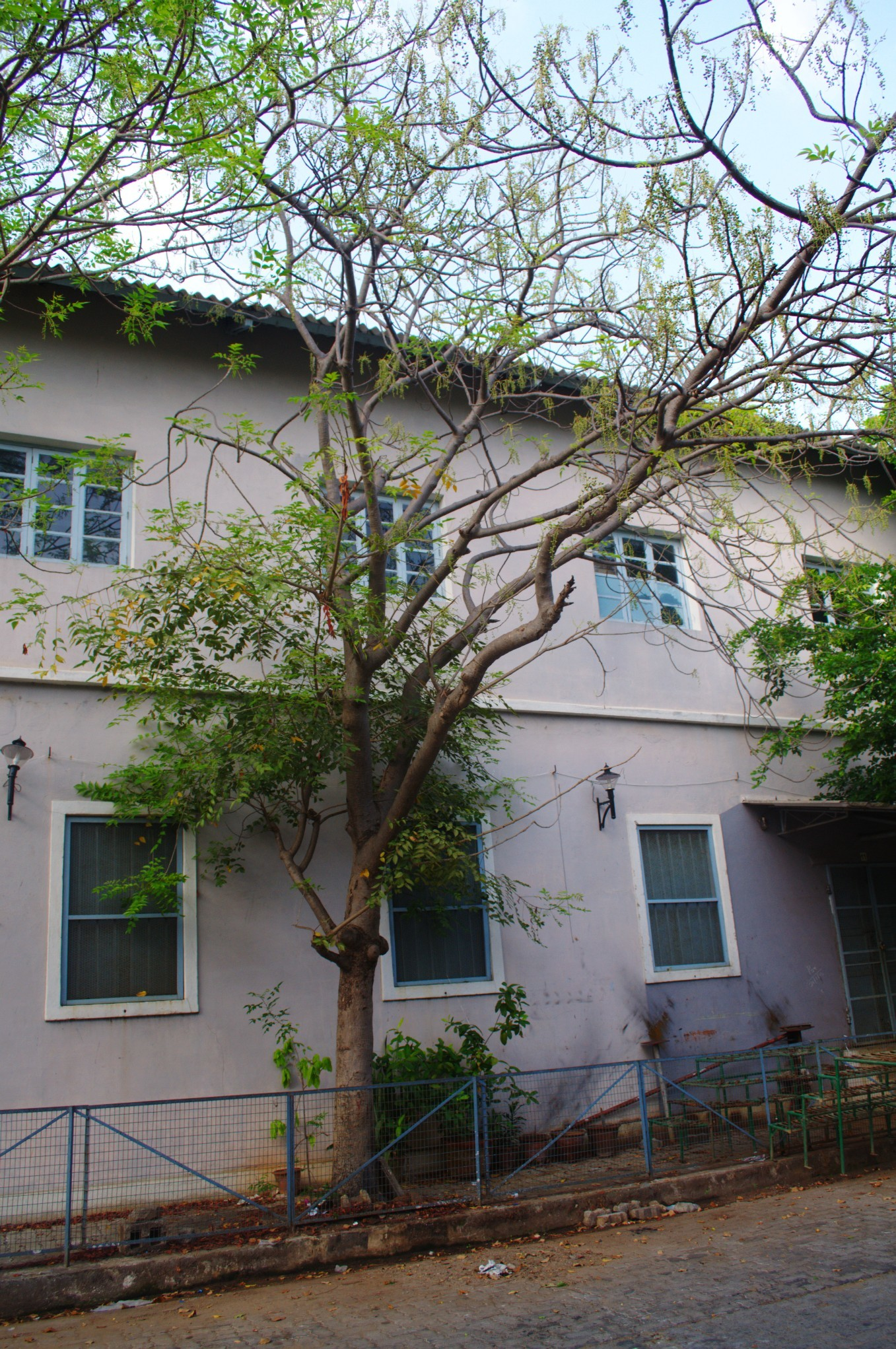
- Habit
- Least Concern (IUCN 3.1)

Scientific classification
- Kingdom: Plantae
- Clade: Embryophytes
- Clade: Tracheophytes
- Clade: Spermatophytes
- Clade: Angiosperms
- Clade: Eudicots
- Clade: Rosids
- Order: Sapindales
- Family: Burseraceae
- Genus: Garuga
- Species: G. floribunda

Binomial name
- Garuga floribunda Decne.

Synonyms
- Kunthia floribunda (Decne.) Kuntze

= Garuga floribunda =

Garuga

Species of flowering plant

Garuga floribunda, commonly known as garuga, is a plant in the frankincense and myrrh family Burseraceae, with a broad distribution from northeastern India through southeast Asia and northern Australia to the southwestern Pacific. It is a tree up to 36 m (118 ft) tall and a trunk diameter up to 90 cm (35 in). The compound leaves are about 38 cm (15 in) long, arranged spirally and clustered near the tips of the branches. The leaflets are odd in number, with dentate margins, and measure up to 10 cm (3.9 in) long by 5 cm (2.0 in) wide.

The inflorescence is a branched panicle carrying numerous flowers, each about 5 mm (0.20 in) long with five sepals and five white to yellow petals. There are ten stamens and a single style. The fruit is a drupe up to 17 mm (0.7 in) long and 25 mm (1.0 in) wide, green to black, containing a jelly-like flesh and up to five seeds.

== Taxonomy ==
This species was first described in 1834 by the French botanist Joseph Decaisne, and published in the journal Nouvelles Annales du Museum d'Histoire Naturelle.

== Distribution and habitat ==
The tree is found from Bangladesh in northeastern India through to south and central China (including the island of Hainan), and south to Laos, Thailand, all of Malesia (except Sumatra), New Guinea, the Solomon Islands, Samoa, Tonga, Vanuatu, and the Australian states of Western Australia and Queensland. It inhabits drier rainforest types such as monsoon forest and gallery forest up to about 400 m (1,300 ft) altitude.

== Conservation ==
As of September 2024, this species has been assessed to be of least concern by the International Union for Conservation of Nature (IUCN), as well as under the Queensland Government's Nature Conservation Act.

== Gallery ==
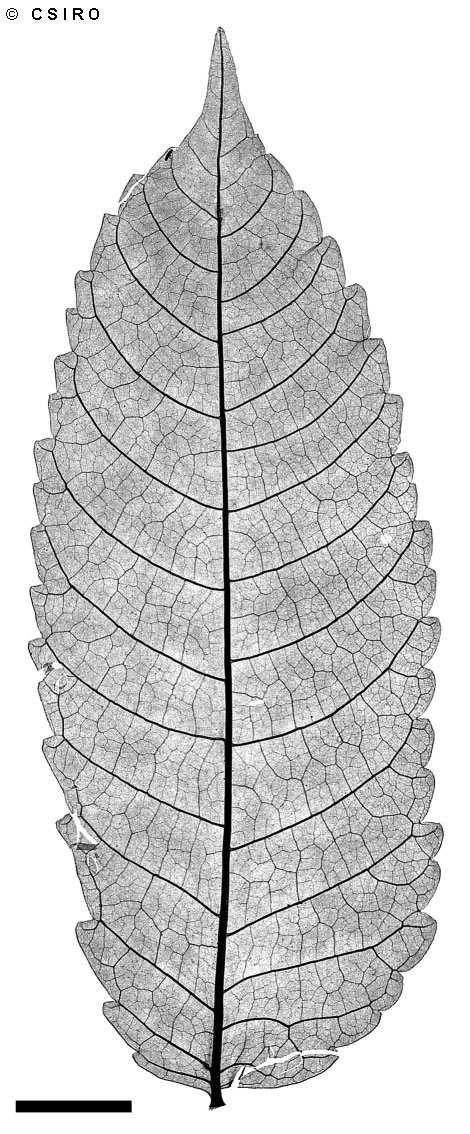
X-ray of leaf

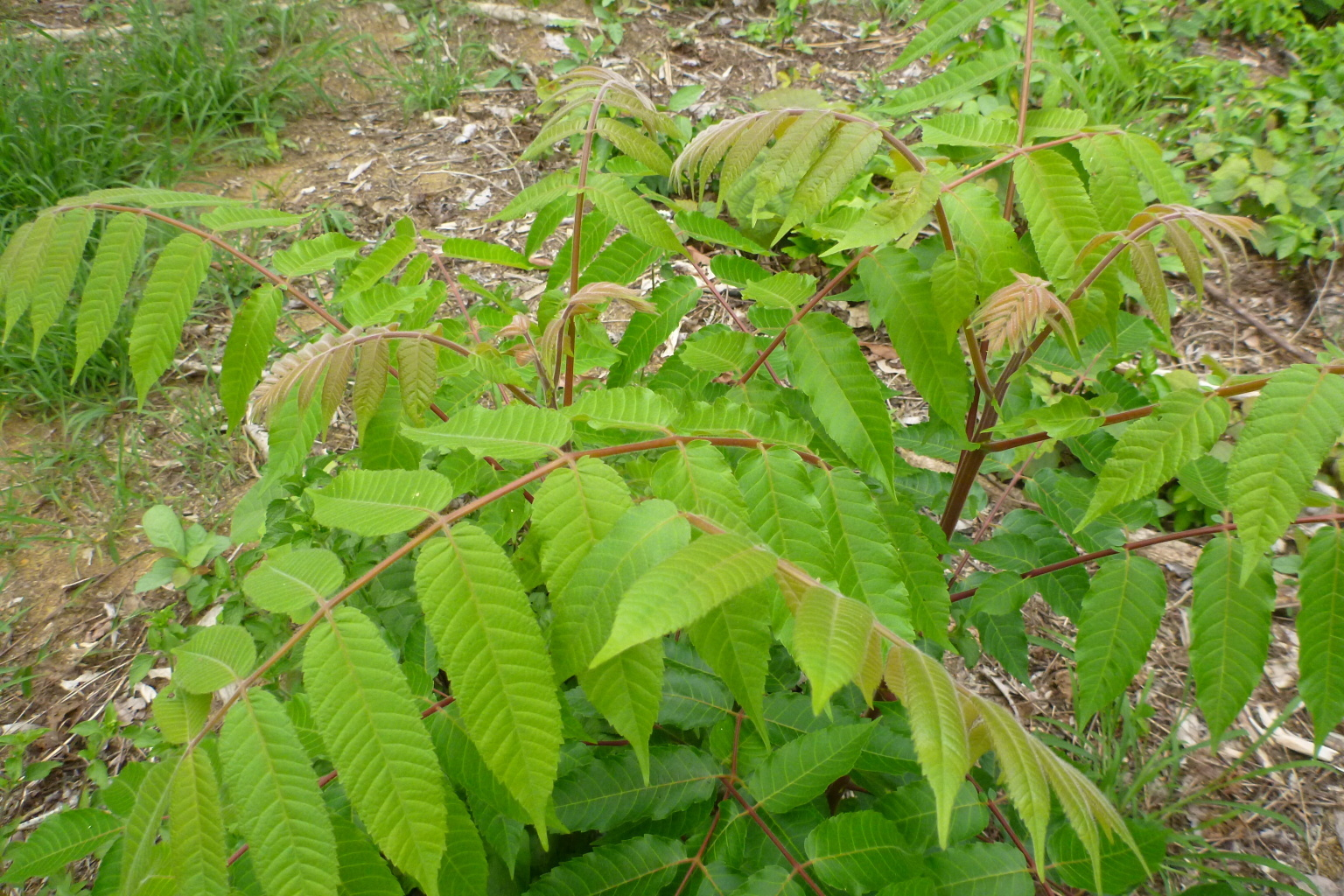
Foliage

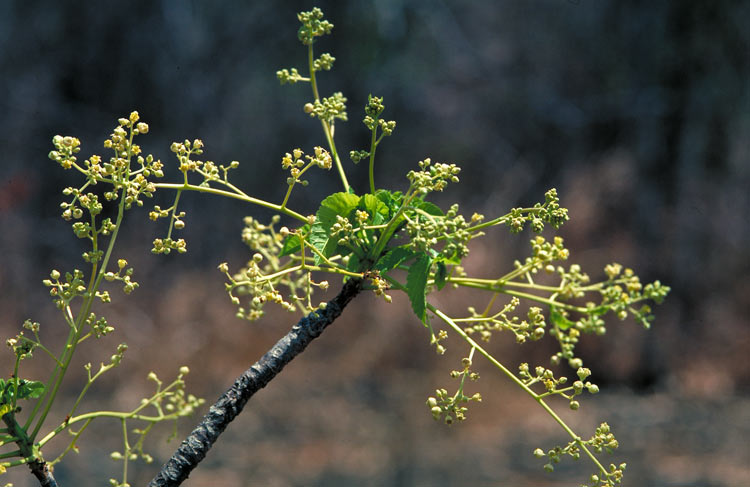
Inflorescence

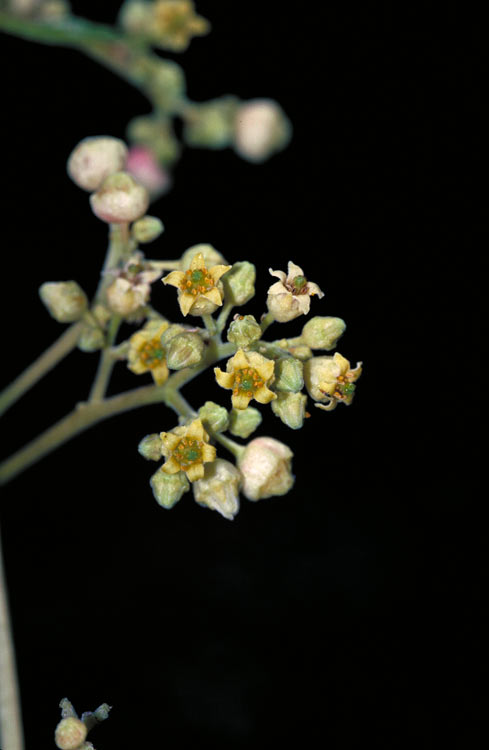
Flowers

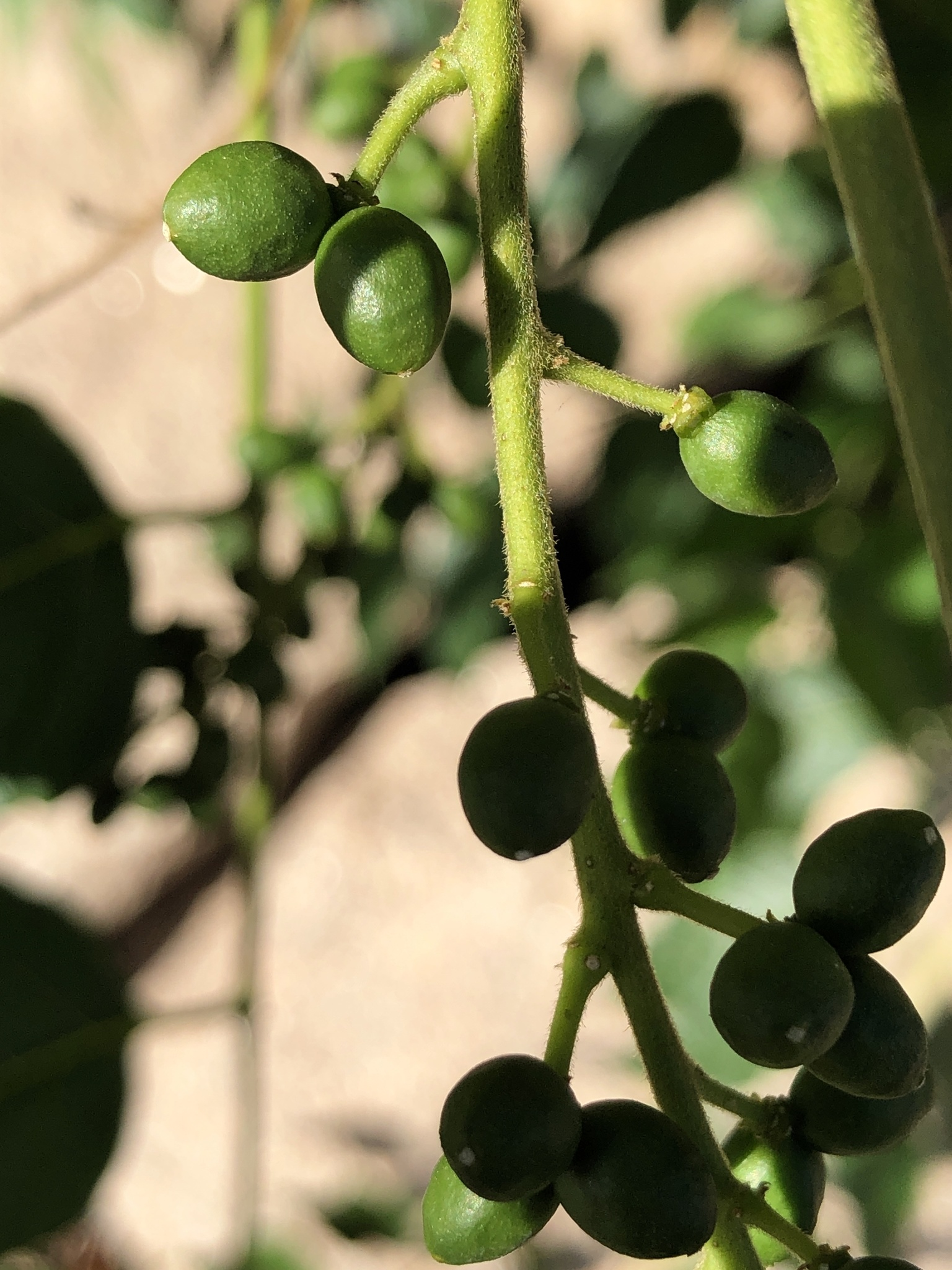
Fruit
