= Piula Cave Pool =

Freshwater pool in Upolu, Samoa

- Location within Samoa
- Coordinates: 13.873209°S 171.597078°W
- Basin countries: Samoa

Piula Cave Pool (also known as Fatumea Pool) is a natural freshwater pool by the sea beneath the historic Methodist Chapel at Piula on the north coast of Upolu island in Samoa. It is situated at Lufilufi in the political district of Atua, 26 km east from the capital Apia, along the scenic coastal road. Entry is by the main road through the painted stone wall of Piula Theological College with steps leading down to the pool.

A popular swimming hole for locals and visitors, the pool is formed by a natural spring flowing out of a cave and out to sea. Inside the main cave opening on the north side is a short submerged tunnel leading to a smaller cave opening on the east side of the pool. It is open Mondays to Saturdays and there are small fale and changing rooms for visitors. The monastery charges a small visitor's fee.

Freshwater pools are fairly common around the coastlines of Savai'i and Upolu islands which were formed from volcanic activity. Cooling lava flows from volcanic eruptions resulted in lava-tunnels that have become conduits for water.

== History ==
The Methodist Mission in Samoa purchased the land for a training institution at Lufilufi in 1868 and named it Piula Theological College. The name Piula is a transliteration of the biblical name Beulah.

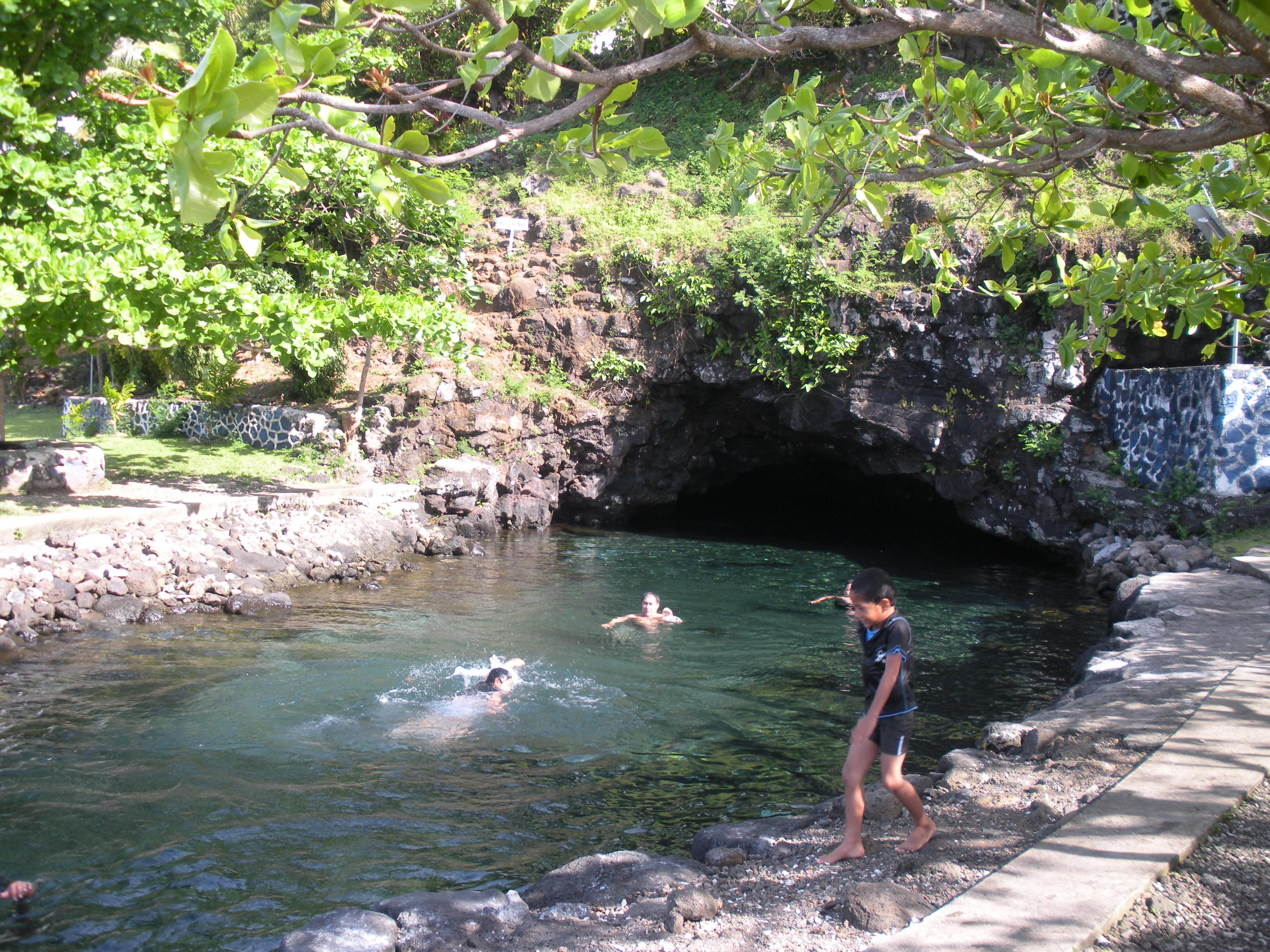
Piula cave pool

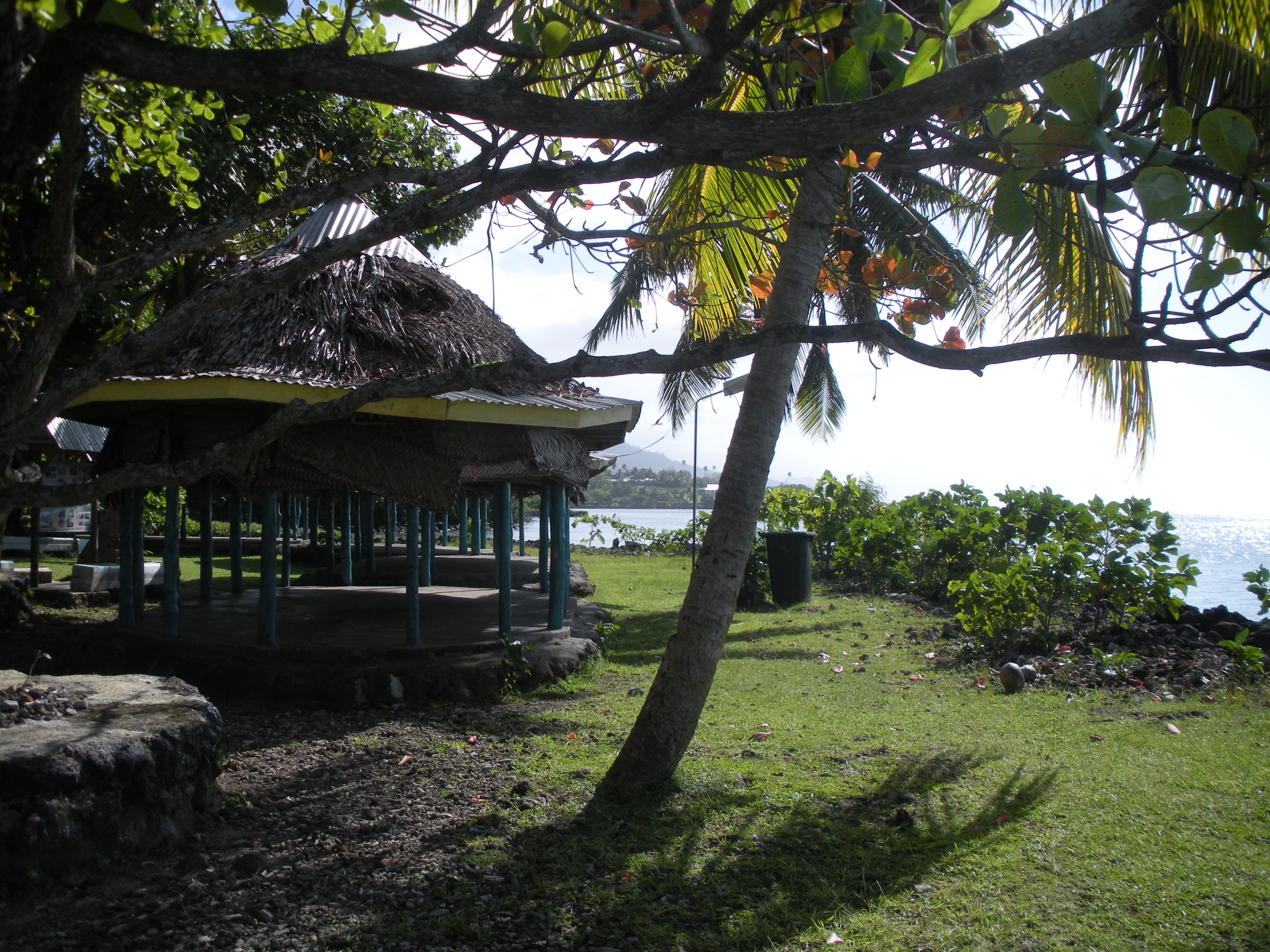
fale for visitors by the pool

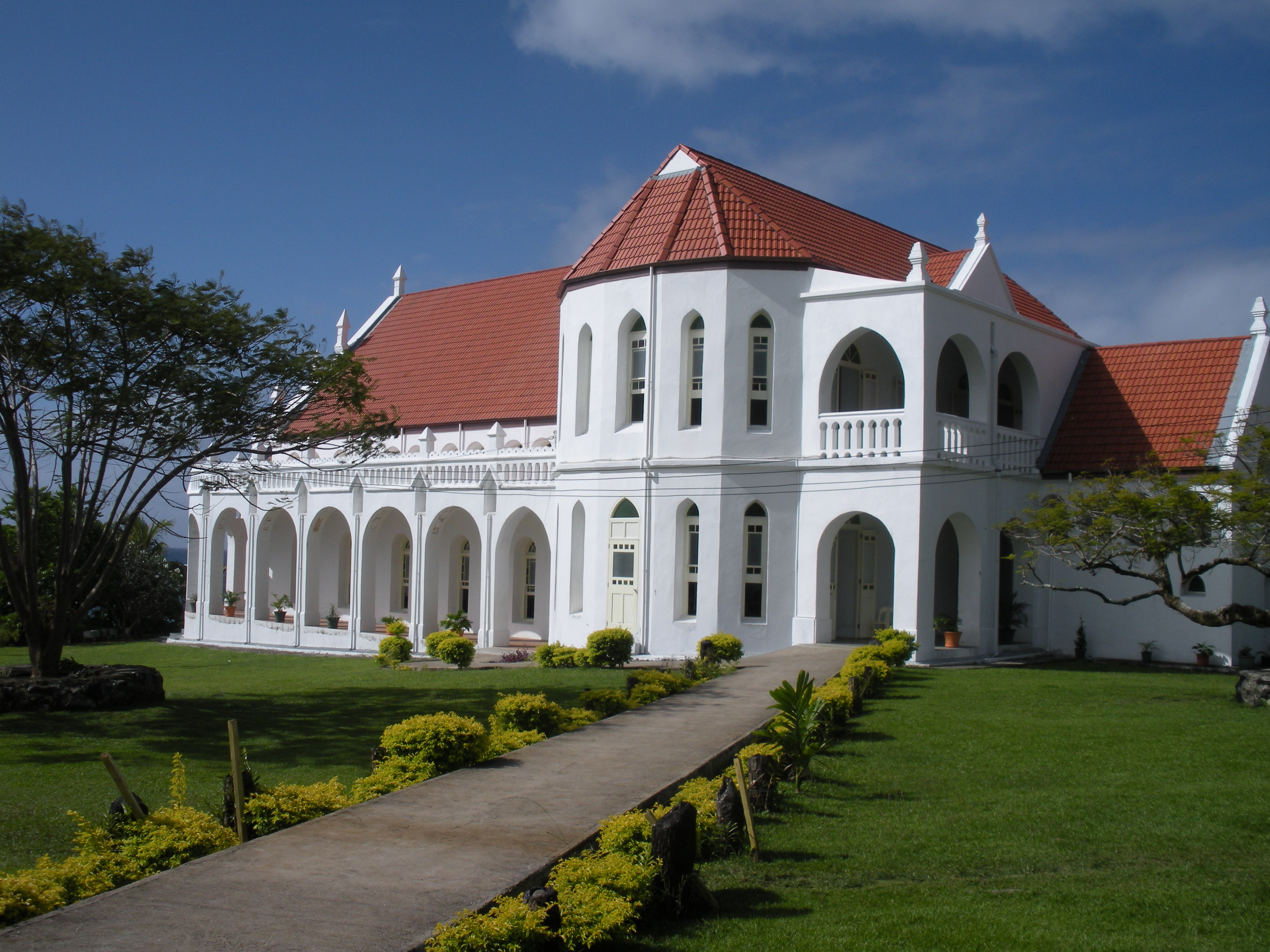
Piula Chapel

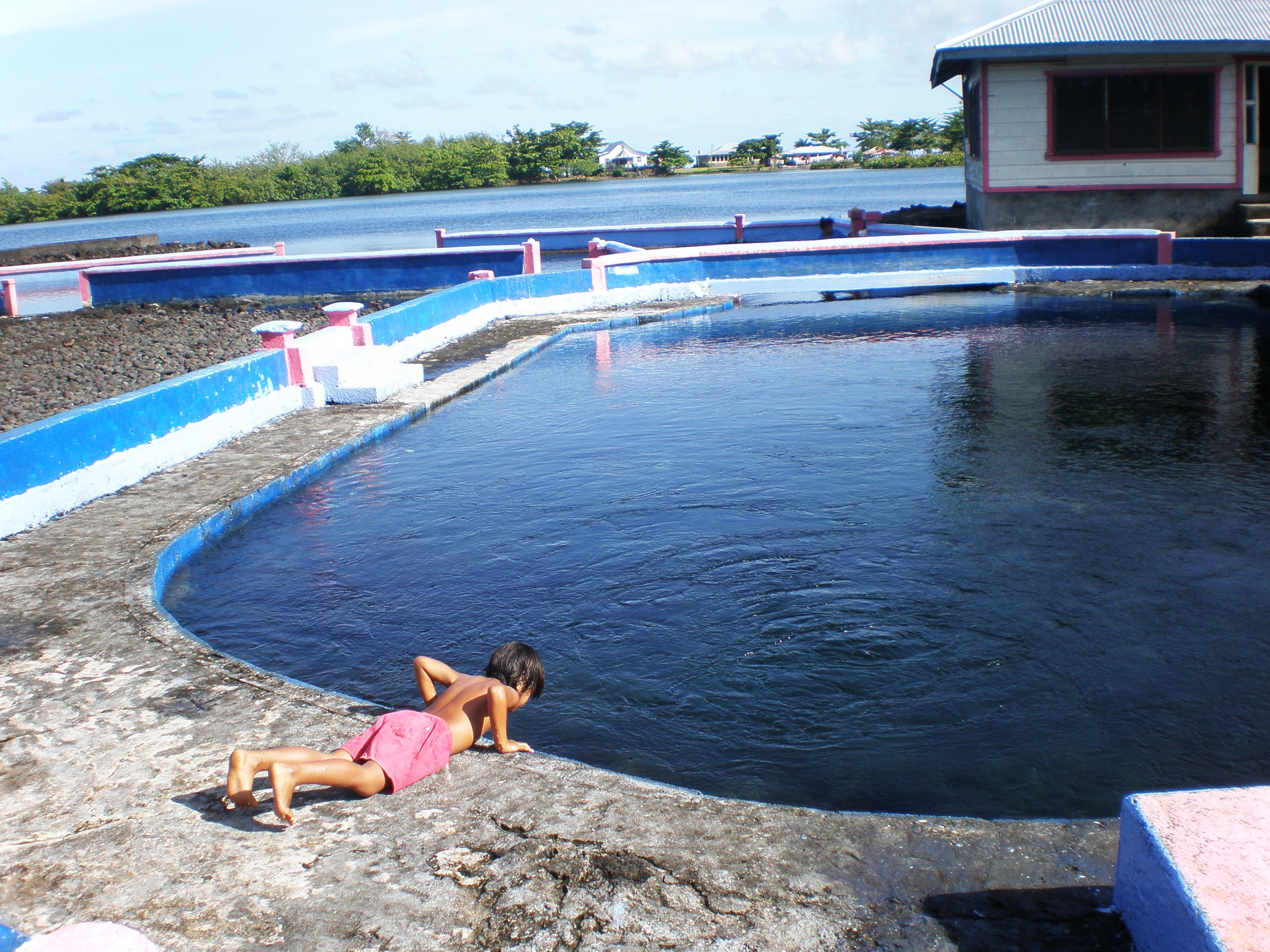
Mata o le Alelo pool on Savai'i

== See also ==
- Lava tube
- Falemauga Caves
