= Vaega =

Village in Samoa

Coordinates: 13°46′S 172°20′W

Vaega is a village on the island of Savai'i in Samoa. It is situated on the south coast of the island in the district of Satupa'itea and the electoral district of Satupa'itea. The population is 571.
