= Architecture of Samoa =

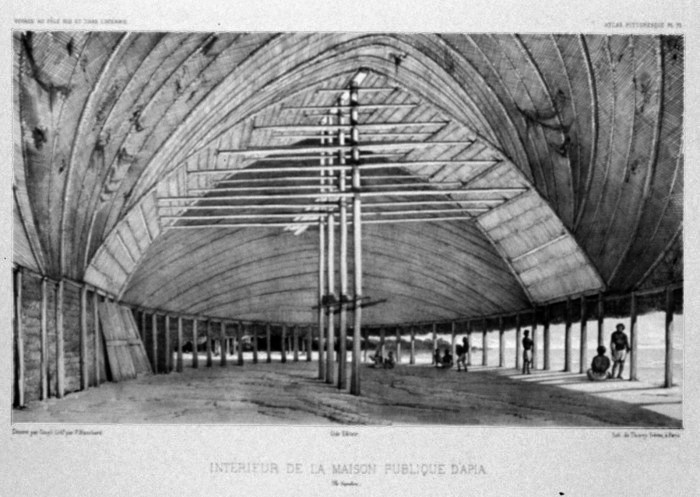
Interior fale, Apia, D'Urville, 1842

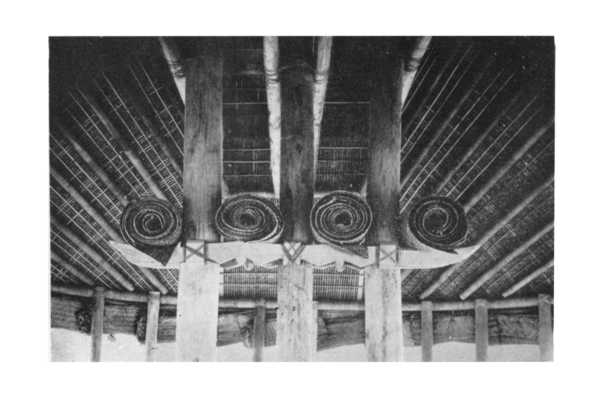
Interior fale tele with central pillars and curved rafters

The architecture of Samoa is characterised by openness, with the design mirroring the culture and life of the Samoan people who inhabit the Samoa Islands. Architectural concepts are incorporated into Samoan proverbs, oratory and metaphors, as well as linking to other art forms in Samoa, such as boat building and tattooing. The spaces outside and inside of traditional Samoan architecture are part of cultural form, ceremony and ritual.

Fale is the Samoan word for all types of houses, from small to large.

In general, traditional Samoan architecture is characterized by an oval or circular shape, with wooden posts holding up a domed roof. There are no walls. The base of the architecture is a skeleton frame.

Before European arrival and the availability of Western materials, a Samoan fale did not use any metal in its construction.

== Lashing ʻafa ==
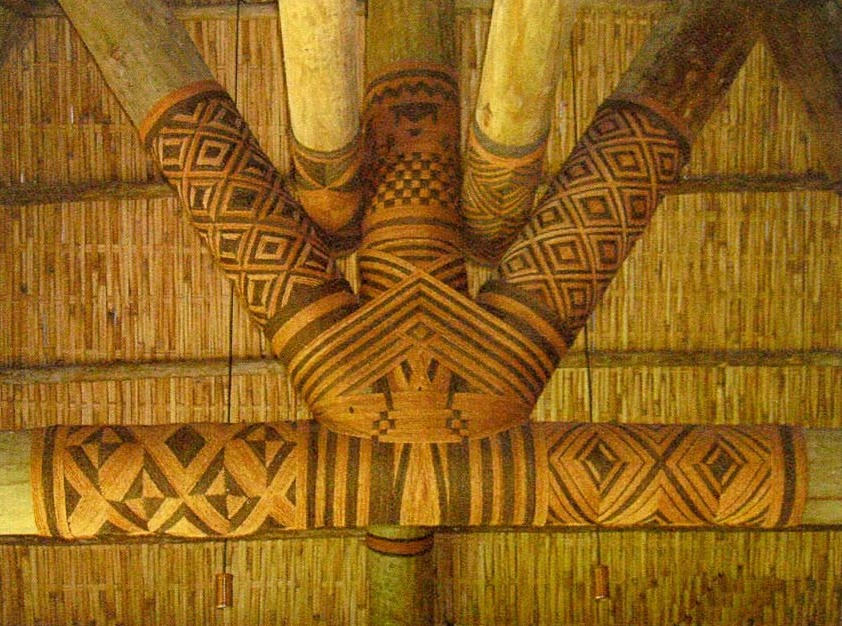
Similar Fijian lashing (magimagi)

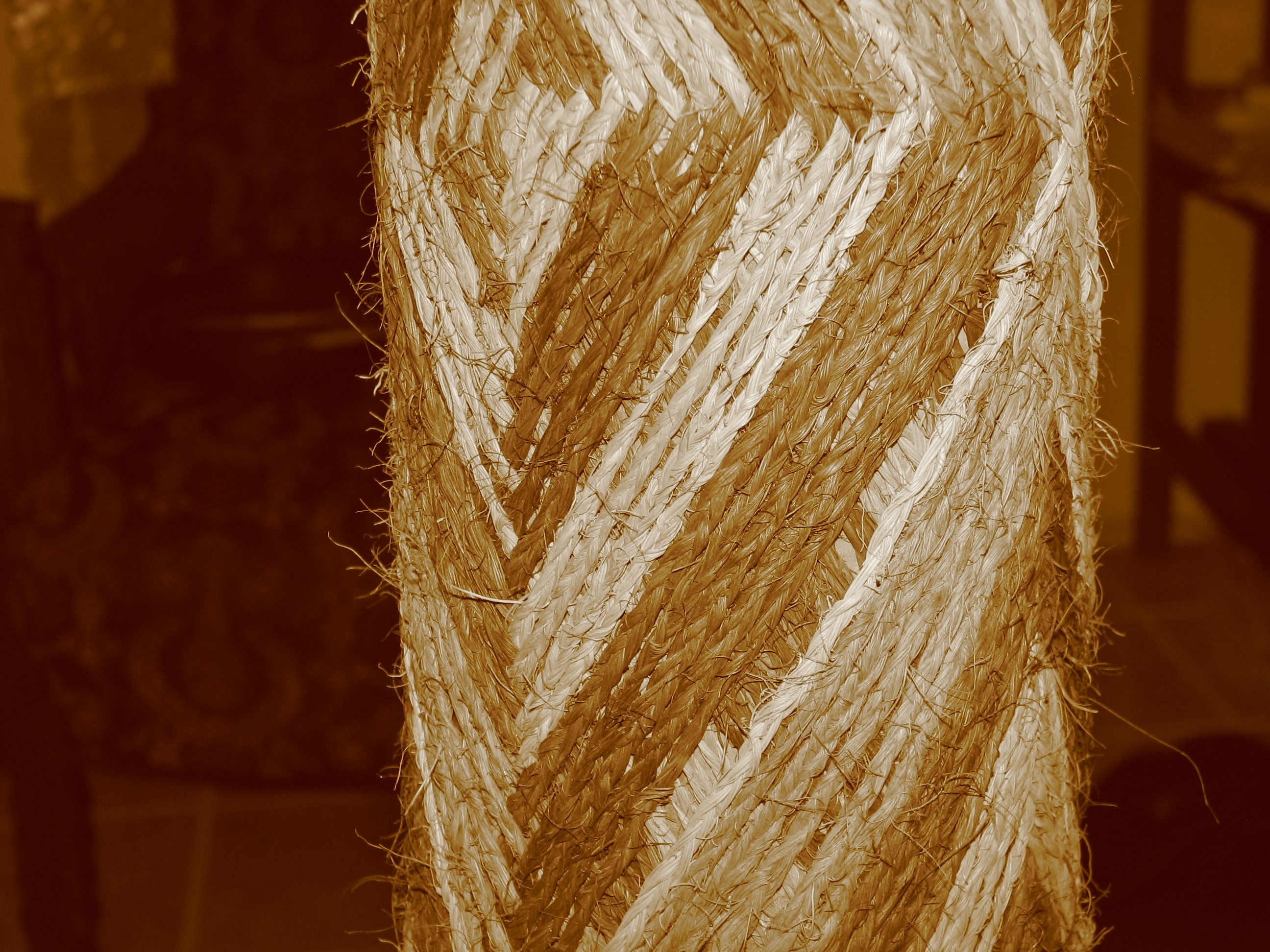
ʻAfa woven pattern

The fale is lashed and tied together with a plaited sennit rope called ʻafa, handmade from dried coconut fibre. The ʻafa is woven tight in complex patterns around the wooden frame, and binds the entire construction together. ʻAfa is made from the husk of certain varieties of coconuts with long fibres, particularly the niuʻafa (afa palm). The husks are soaked in fresh water to soften the interfibrous portion. The husks from mature nuts must be soaked from four to five weeks, or perhaps even longer, and very mature fibre is best soaked in salt water, but the green husk from a special variety of coconut is ready in four or five days. Soaking is considered to improve the quality of the fibre. Old men or women then beat the husk with a mallet on a wooden anvil to separate the fibres, which, after a further washing to remove interfibrous material, are tied together in bundles and dried in the sun. When this stage is completed, the fibres are manufactured into sennit by plaiting, a task usually done by elderly men or matai, and performed at their leisure. This usually involves them seated on the ground rolling the dried fibre strands against their bare thigh by hand, until heavier strands are formed. These long, thin strands are then woven together into a three-ply plait, often in long lengths, which is the finished sennit. The sennit is then coiled in bundles or wound tightly in very neat cylindrical rolls.

Making enough lengths of ʻafa for an entire house can take months of work. The construction of an ordinary traditional fale is estimated to use 30,000 to 50,000 feet (9,100 to 15,200 m) of ʻafa. The lashing construction of the Samoan fale is one of the great architectural achievements of Polynesia. A similar lashing technique was also used in traditional boat building, where planks of wood were 'sewn' together in parts. ʻAfa has many other uses in Samoan material culture, including ceremonial items, such as the fue fly whisk, a symbol of orator status. This lashing technique was also used in other parts of Polynesia, such as the magimagi of Fiji.

== Cultural space ==
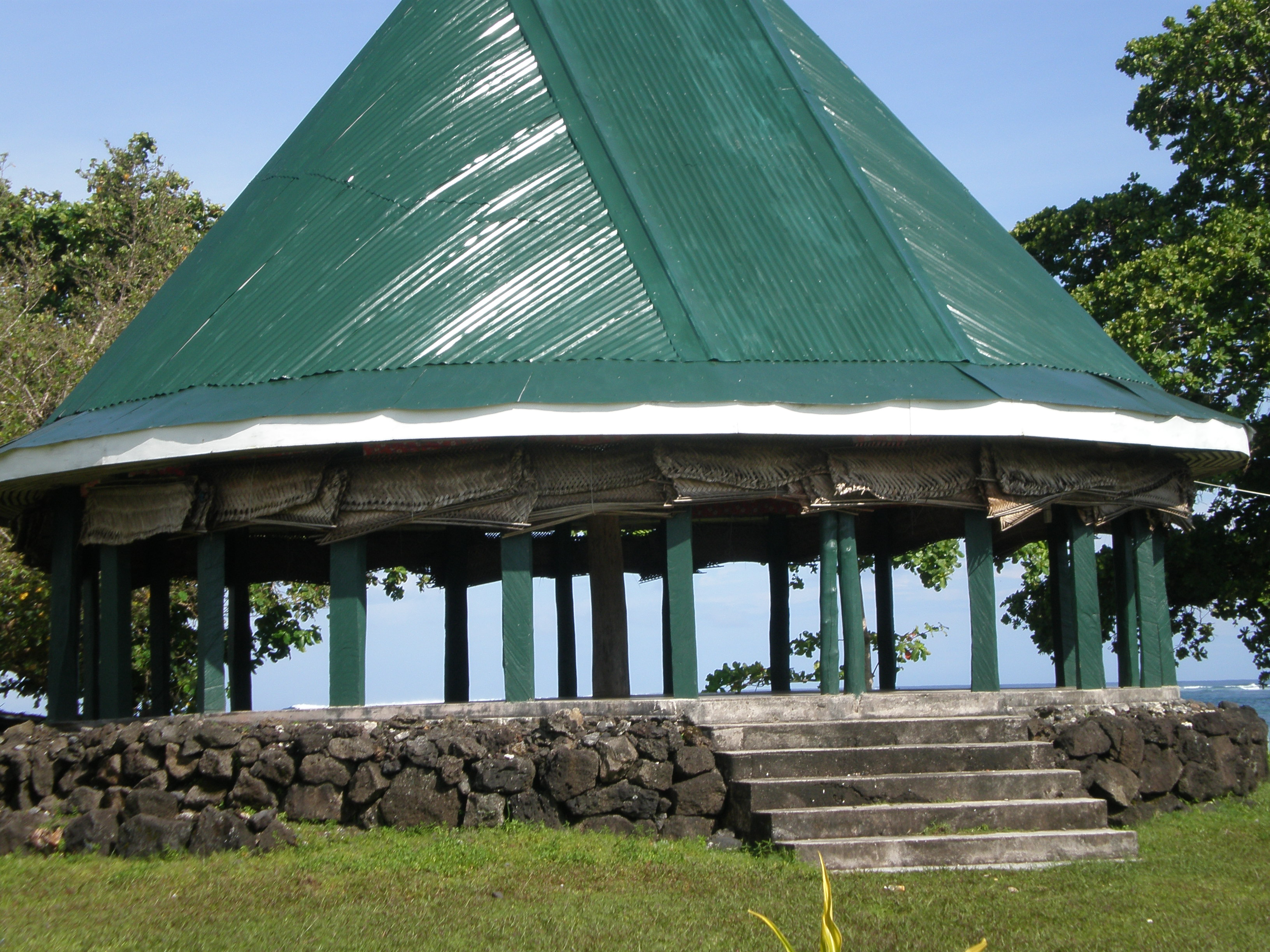
Situated by the beach and raised a meter off the ground, this fale tele in Lelepa village on Savai'i Island has an iron roof replacing traditional thatching for the roof, although pola (suspended in photo), traditional 'wall blinds' around the poles of the fale are still used.

The form of a fale, especially the large meeting houses, creates both physical and invisible spatial areas, which are clearly understood in Samoan custom, and dictate areas of social interaction. The use and function of the fale is closely linked to the Samoan system of social organisation, especially the Fa'amatai chiefly system.

Those gathered at a formal gathering or fono are always seated cross-legged on mats on the floor, around the fale, facing each other with an open space in the middle. The interior directions of a fale, east, west, north and south, as well as the positions of the posts, affect the seating positions of chiefs according to rank, the place where orators (host or visiting party) must stand to speak or the side of the house where guests and visitors enter and are seated. The space also defines the position where the ʻava makers (aumaga) in the ʻava ceremony are seated and the open area for the presentation and exchanging of cultural items such as the ʻie toga fine mats.

The front of a Samoan house is that part that faces the main thoroughfare or road through the village. The floor is quartered, and each section is named: tala luma is the front side section, tala tua the back section, and tala, the two end or side sections. The middle posts, termed matua tala are reserved for the leading chiefs and the side posts on the front section, termed pou o le pepe are occupied by the orators. The posts at the back of the house, talatua, indicate the positions maintained by the ʻava makers and others serving the gathering.

The immediate area exterior of the fale is usually kept clear, and is either a grassy lawn or sandy area if the village is by the sea. The open area in front of the large meeting houses, facing the main thoroughfare or road in a village, is called the malae, and is an important outdoor area for larger gatherings and ceremonial interaction.

The word fale is also constructed with other words to denote social groupings or rank, such as the faleiva (house of nine) orator group in certain districts. The term is also used to describe certain buildings and their functions. The word for hospital is falemaʻi, 'house of the ill'.

The simplest types of fale are called faleoʻo, which have become popular as eco-friendly and low-budget beach accommodations in local tourism. Every family complex in Samoa has a fale tele, the meeting house or 'big house'.

The site on which the house is built is called tulaga fale (place to stand).

== Diagrams of fale Samoa ==
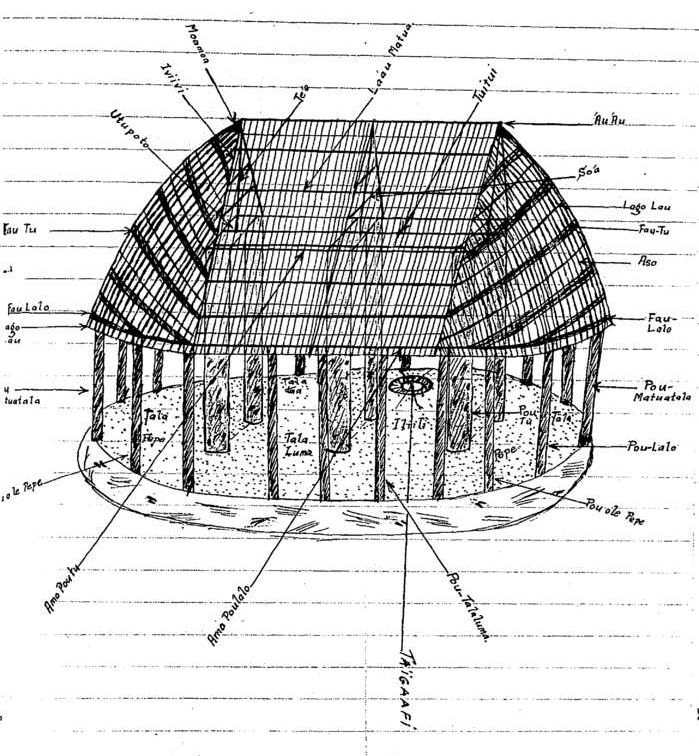

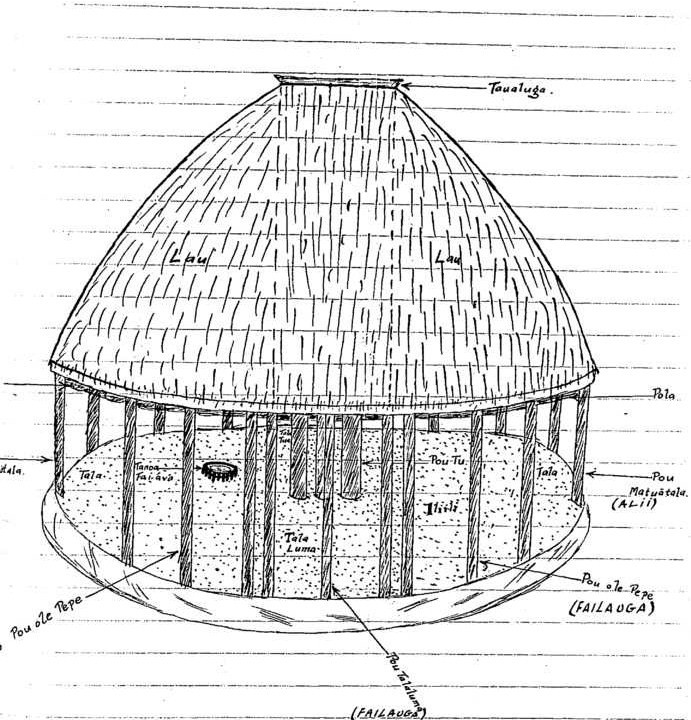

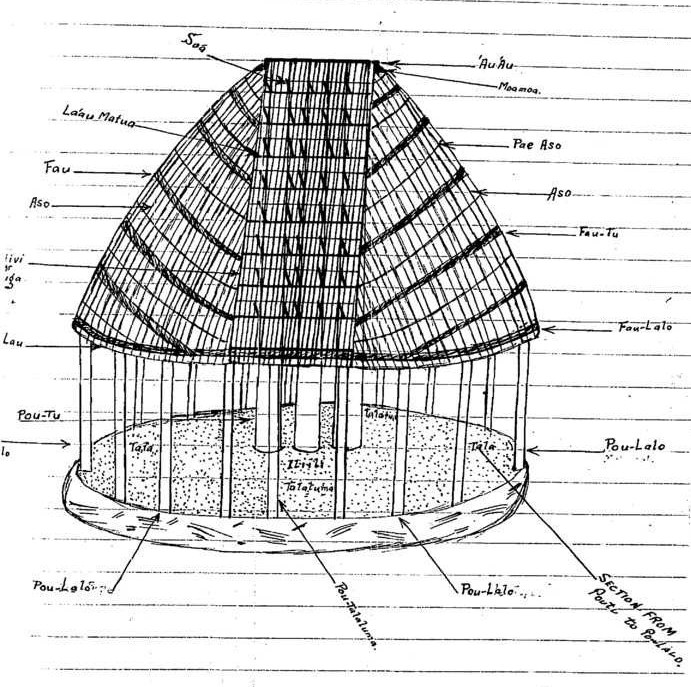

Diagrams of fale showing architectural parts of a traditional house in the Samoan language; from An Account of Samoan History up to 1918 by Samoan historian Teo Tuvale.

== Tufuga fau fale ==
The builders in Samoan architecture were also the architects, and they belonged to an exclusive ancient guild of master builders, Tufuga fau fale. The Samoan word tufuga denotes the status of master craftsmen who have achieved the highest rank in skill and knowledge in a particular traditional art form. The words fau-fale mean house builder. There were Tufuga of navigation (Tufuga fau vaʻa) and Samoan tattooing (Tufuga ta tatau). Contracting the services of a Tufuga fau fale required negotiations and cultural custom.

== Types of fale ==
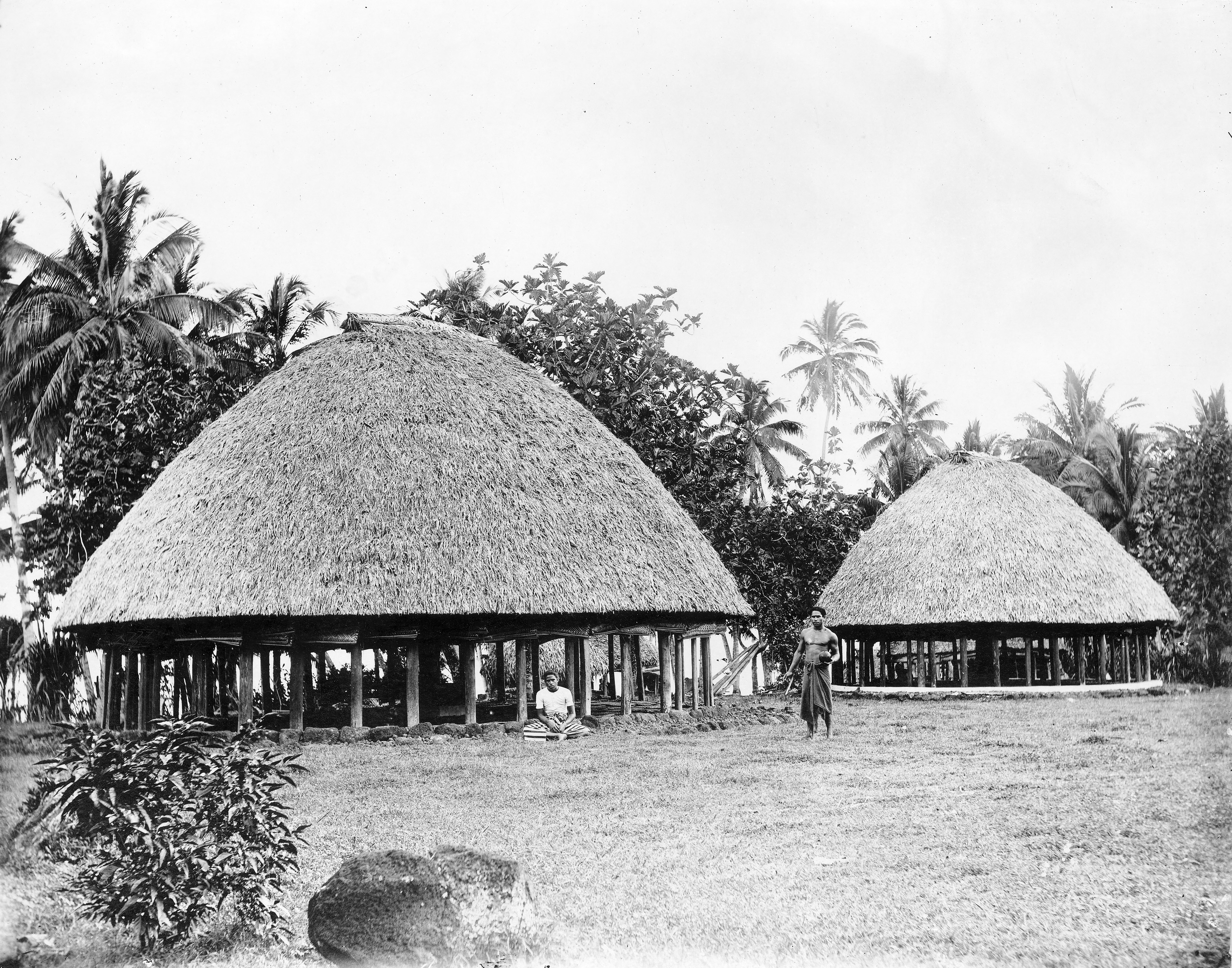
Fale tele in a village

The fale tele (big house), the most important house, is usually round in shape, and serves as a meeting house for chief council meetings, family gatherings, funerals or chief title investitures. The fale tele is always situated at the front of all other houses in an extended family complex. The houses behind it serve as living quarters, with an outdoor cooking area at the rear of the compound. At the front is an open area, called a malae. The malae, (similar to the concept of marae in Māori and other Polynesian cultures), is usually a well-kept, grassy lawn or sandy area. The malae is an important cultural space where interactions between visitors and hosts or outdoor formal gatherings take place.

The open characteristics of Samoan architecture are also mirrored in the overall pattern of house sites in a village, where all fale tele are situated prominently at the fore of all other dwellings in the village, and sometimes form a semicircle, usually facing seawards.

In modern times, with the decline of traditional architecture and the availability of western building materials, the shape of the fale tele has become rectangular, though the spatial areas in custom and ceremony remain the same.

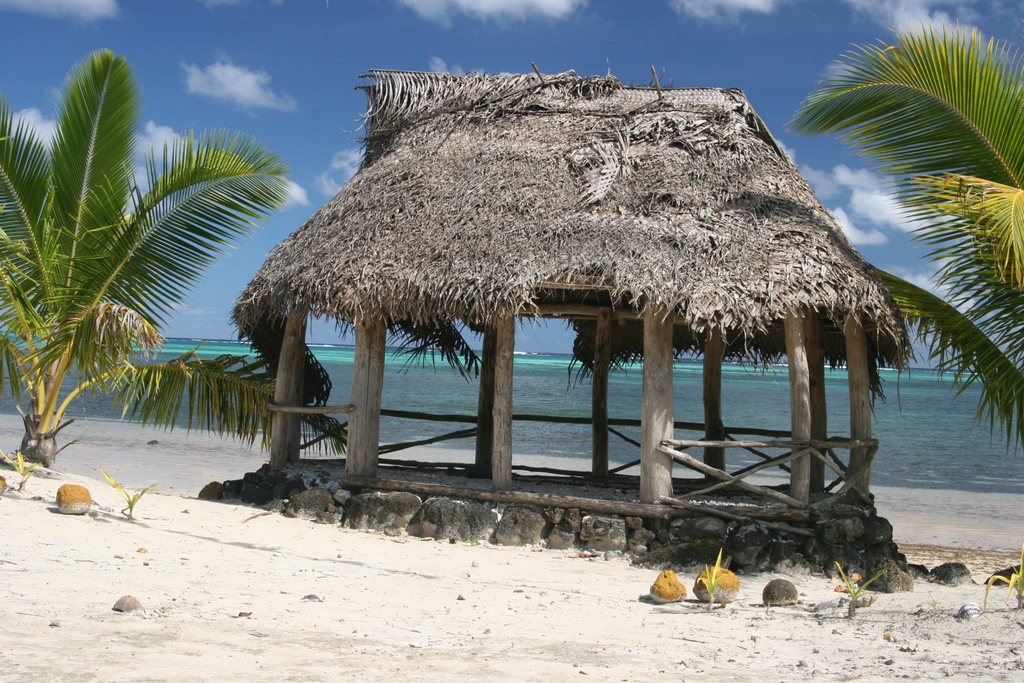
Faleoʻo (beach fale) with simple roof thatching on Manono Island, 2009

Traditionally, the afolau (long house), a longer fale shaped like a stretched oval, served as the dwelling house or guest house.

The faleoʻo (small house), traditionally long in shape, was an addition to the main house. It is not so well-constructed and is situated always at the back of the main dwelling. In modern times, the term is also used for any type of small and simple fale, which is not the main house of dwelling. Popular as a "grass hut" or beach fale in village tourism, many are raised about a meter off the ground on stilts, sometimes with an iron roof. In a village, families build a faleoʻo beside the main house or by the sea for resting during the heat of the day or as an extra sleeping space at night if there are guests.

The tunoa (cook house) is a flimsy structure, small in size, and not to be considered as a house. In modern times, the cook house, called the umukuka, is at the rear of the family compound, where all the cooking is carried out in an earth oven, umu, and pots over the fire. In most villages, the umukuka is a simple open shed made with a few posts with an iron roof to protect the cooking area from the weather.

== Construction ==
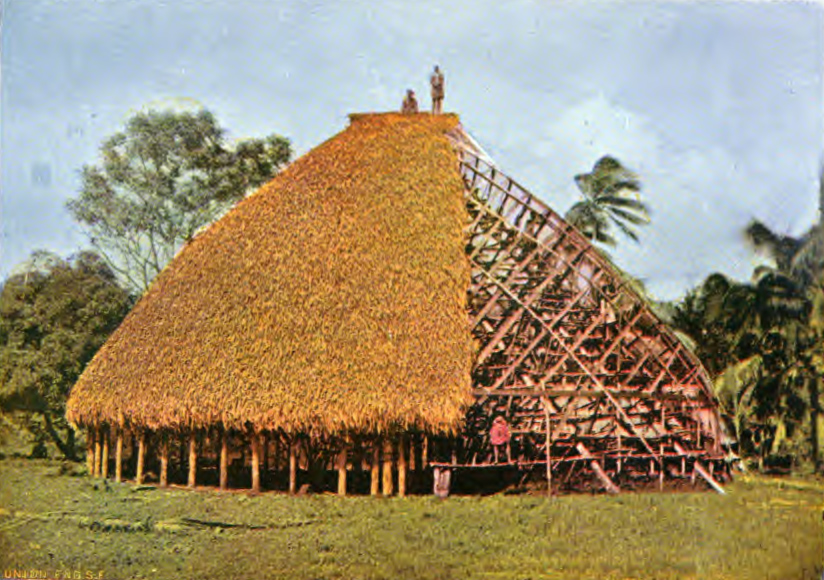
Samoan fale construction 1896

Construction of a fale, especially the large and important fale tele, often involves the whole extended family and help from their village community.

The Tufuga fai fale oversees the entire building project. Before construction, the family prepares the building site. Lava, coral, sand or stone materials are usually used for this purpose. The Tufuga, his assistants (autufuga) and men from the family cut the timber from the forest.

The main supporting posts, erected first, vary in number, size and length depending on the shape and dimensions of the house. Usually they are between 16 and 25 feet (4.9 and 7.6 m) in length and 6 to 12 inches (15 to 30 cm) in diameter, and are buried about 4 feet (1.2 m) in the ground. The term for these posts is poutu (standing posts); they are erected in the middle of the house, forming central pillars.

Attached to the poutu are cross pieces of wood of a substantial size called soʻa. The soʻa extend from the poutu to the outside circumference of the fale and their ends are fastened to further supporting pieces called laʻau faʻalava.

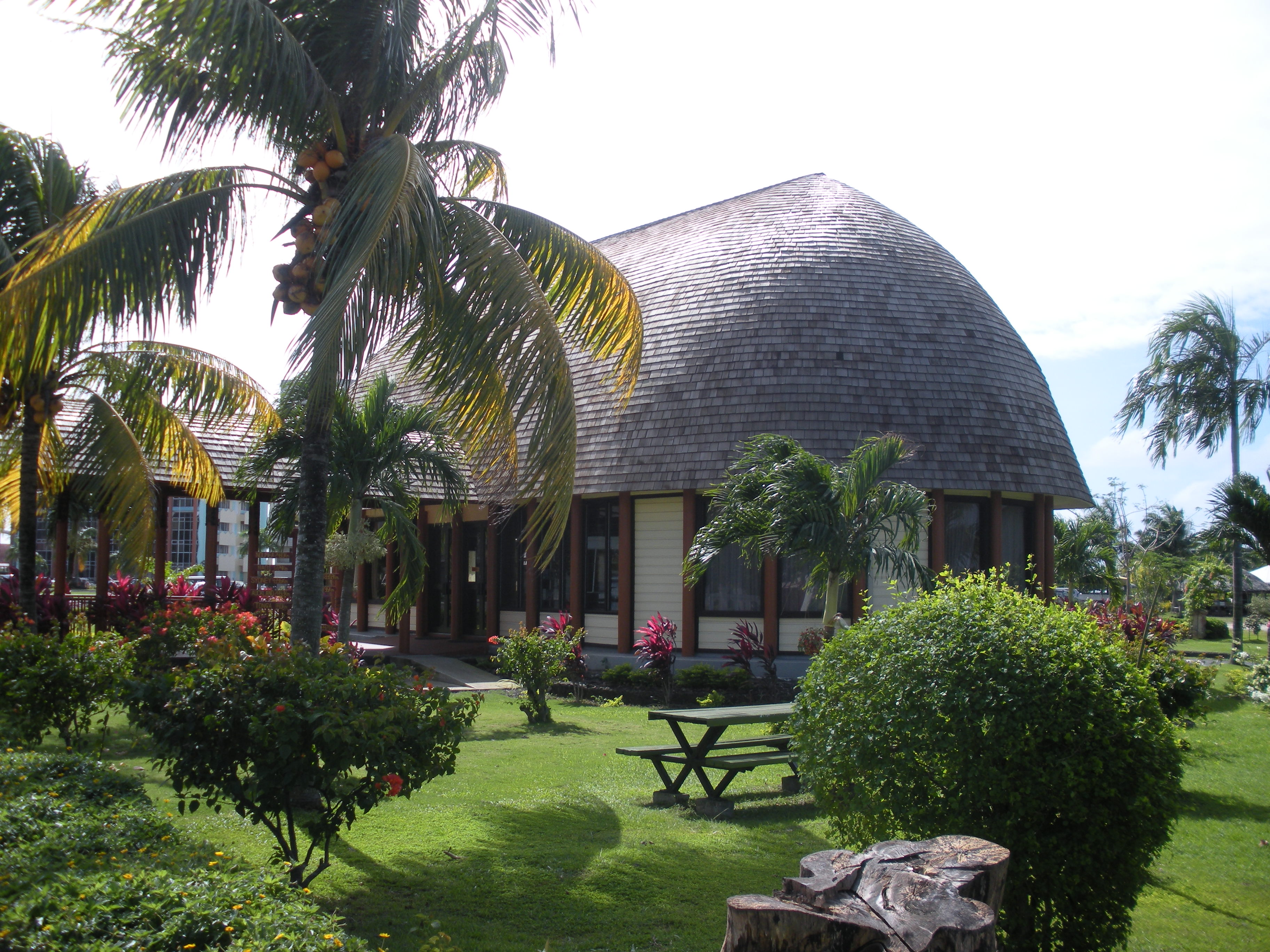
Samoa tourism office in Apia incorporating traditional design of a fale

The laʻau faʻalava, placed horizontally, are attached at their ends to wide strips of wood continuing from the faulalo to the auau. These wide strips are called iviʻivi. The faulalo is a tubular piece (or pieces) of wood about 4 inches (10 cm) in diameter running around the circumference of the house at the lower extremity of the roof, and is supported on the poulalo. The auau is one or more pieces of wood of substantial size resting on the top of the poutu. At a distance of about 2 feet (0.61 m) between each are circular pieces of wood running around the house and extending from the faulalo to the top of the building. They are similar to the faulalo.

The poulalo are spaced about 3–4 feet (0.91–1.22 m) apart and are sunk about 2 feet (0.61 m) in the ground. They average 3–4 inches (7.6–10.2 cm) in diameter, and extend about 5 feet (1.5 m) above the floor of the fale. The height of the poulalo above the floor determines the height of the lower extremity of the roof from the ground.

On the framework are attached innumerable aso, thin strips of timber (about .5 by .25 inches (1.27 by 0.64 cm) by 12 to 25 feet (3.7 to 7.6 m) in length). They extend from the faulalo to the iviʻivi, and are spaced from 1 to 2 inches (2.5 to 5.1 cm) apart. Attached to these strips at right angles are further strips, paeaso, the same size as aso. As a result, the roof of the fale is divided into an enormous number of small squares.

== Timber ==
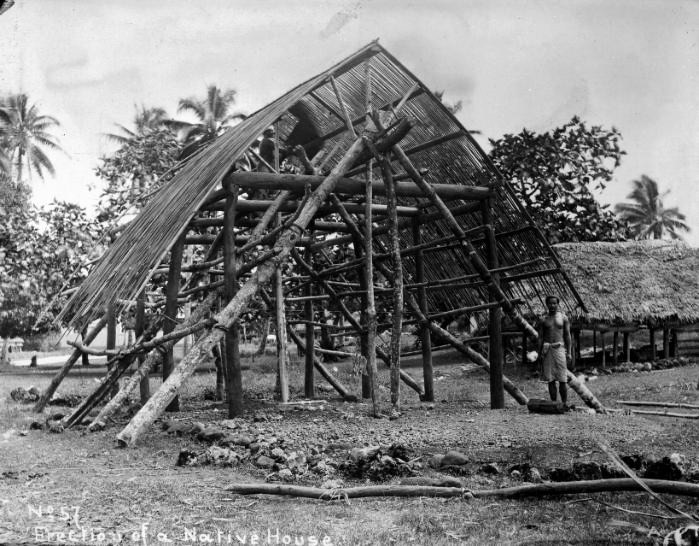
Fale under construction, 1914

Most of the timber is grown in forests on family land. The timber was cut in the forest and carried to the building site in the village. The heavy work involved the builder's assistants, members of the family and help from the village community.

The main posts were from the breadfruit tree (ulu), or ifi lele or pou muli if this wood was not available. The long principal rafters had to be flexible, so coconut wood (niu) was always selected. The breadfruit tree was also used for other parts of the main framework.

In general, the timbers most frequently used in the construction of Samoan houses are:

Posts (poutu and poulalo): ifi lele, pou muli, asi, ulu, talia, launiniʻu and aloalovao.

Fau: ulu, fau, niu, and uagani

Aso and paeso: niuvao, ulu, matomo and olomea

The auau and talitali use ulu and the soʻaʻ used both ulu and niu.

== Thatch ==
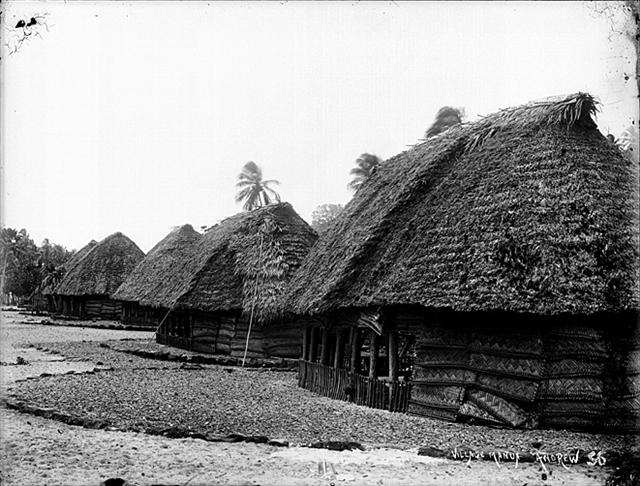
Samoan fale in the Manu'a island group, showing thatched roof and woven pola blinds, circa 1890–1910

The completed, domed framework is covered with thatch (lau leaves), which is made by the women. The best quality of thatch is made with the dry leaves of the sugarcane. If sugarcane leaf was not available, the palm leaves of the coconut tree were used in the same manner. The long, dry leaves are twisted over a 3-foot (0.91 m) length of lafo, which are then fastened by a thin strip of the frond of the coconut being threaded through the leaves close up to the lafo stem.

These sections of thatch are fastened to the outside of the framework of the fale beginning at the bottom and working up to the apex. They are overlapped, so each section advances the thatching about 3 inches (7.6 cm). This means there is a double layer of thatch covering the whole house. The sections are fastened to the aso at each end by afa.

Provided the best quality of thatch is used and it has been properly laid, it will last about seven years. On an ordinary dwelling house, about 3000 sections of thatch are laid.

== Pola ==
Protection from sun, wind or rain, as well as from prying eyes, was achieved by suspending from the fau running round the house several of a sort of drop-down Venetian blind, called pola. The fronds of the coconut tree are plaited into a kind of mat about a foot wide and three feet long. A sufficient number of pola to reach from the ground to the top of the poulalo are fastened together with ʻafa and are tied up or let down as the occasion demands. Usually, one string of these mats covers the space between two poulalo and so on round the house. They do not last for long, but being quickly made, are soon replaced. They afford ample protection from the elements, and it is possible to let them down in sections; seldom is the whole house is closed up.

== Flooring ==
The natural foundations of a fale site are coral, sand, and lava, with sometimes a few inches of soil in some localities. Drainage is therefore good. The top layers of the flooring are smooth pebbles and stones. When occupied, the house floors are usually covered or partially covered with native mats.

In modern times, concrete is used for flooring.

== Mythology ==
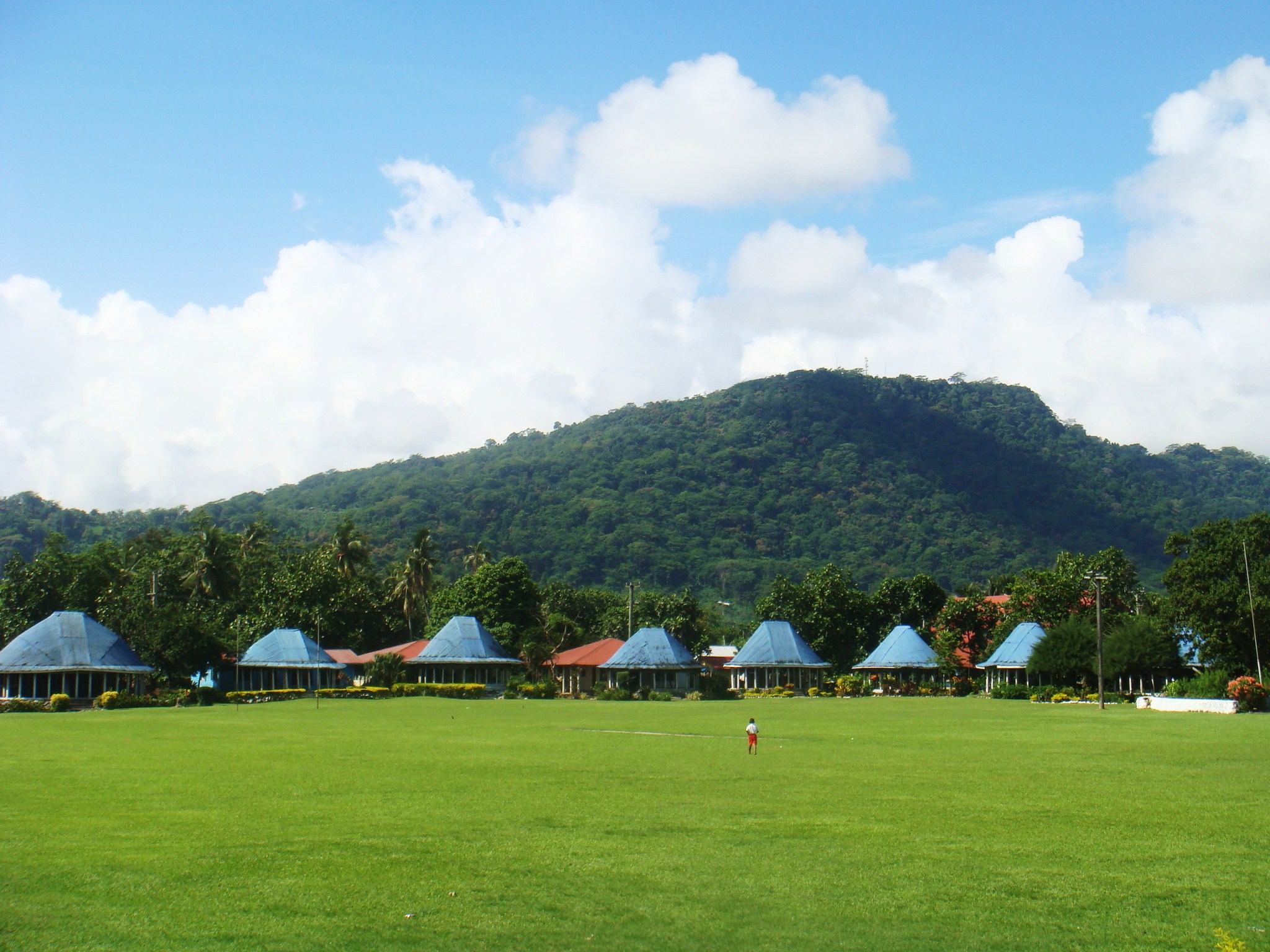
Round fale tele in Lepea village, with Mount Vaea beyond, the burial place of Robert Louis Stevenson

In Samoan mythology, an explanation of why Samoan houses are round is explained in a story about the god Tagaloa, also known as Tagaloalagi (Tagaloa of the Heavens).

Following is the story, as told by Samoan historian Te'o Tuvale in An Account of Samoan History up to 1918:

- During the time of Tagaloalagi, the houses in Samoa varied in shape, and this led to many difficulties for those who wished to have a house built in a certain manner. Each carpenter was proficient in building a house of one particular shape only, and it was sometimes impossible to obtain the services of the carpenter desired. A meeting of all the carpenters in the country was held to try to decide on some uniform shape. The discussion waxed enthusiastic, and as there seemed no prospect of a decision being arrived at, it was decided to call in the services of Tagaloalagi. After considering the matter, he pointed to the dome of Heaven and to the horizon and he decreed that in future, all houses built would be of that shape, and this explains why all the ends of Samoan houses are as the shape of the heavens extending down to the horizon.

An important tree in Samoan architecture is the coconut palm. In Samoan mythology, the first coconut tree is told in a legend called Sina and the Eel.

== European architecture ==
Church architecture in Samoa

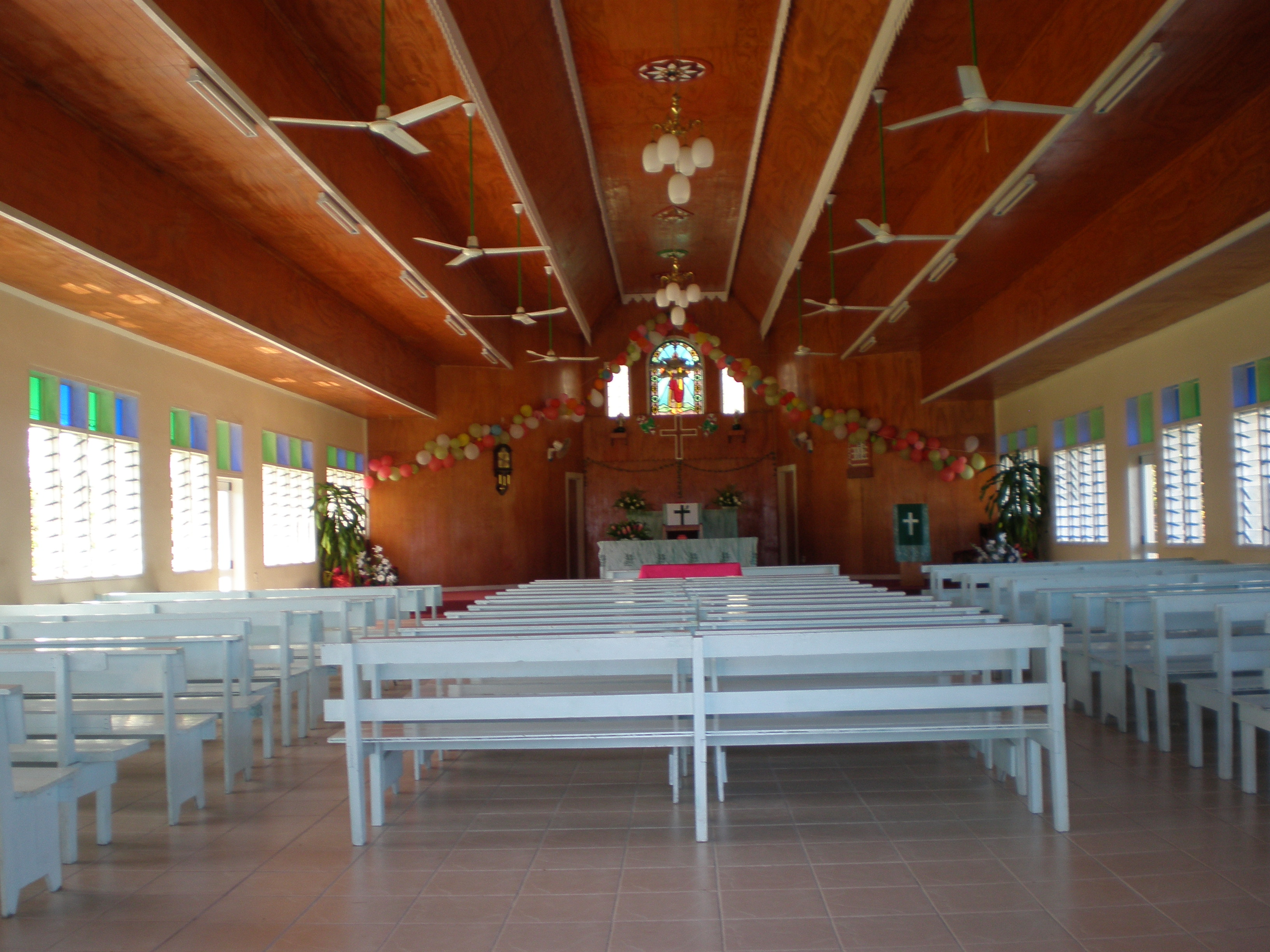
Church interior, Matavai village in Safune, Savai'i Island

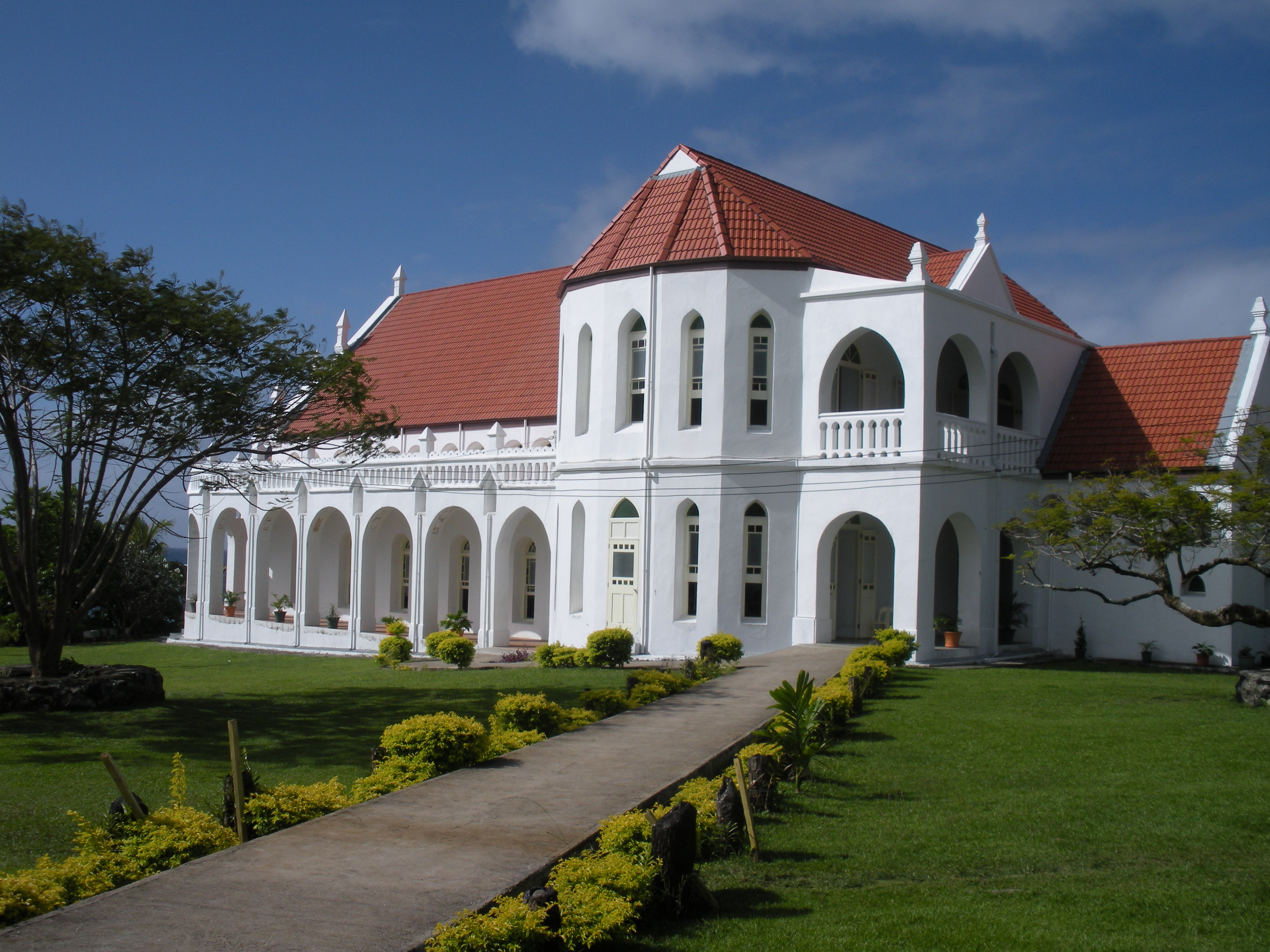
Methodist chapel at Piula Theological College

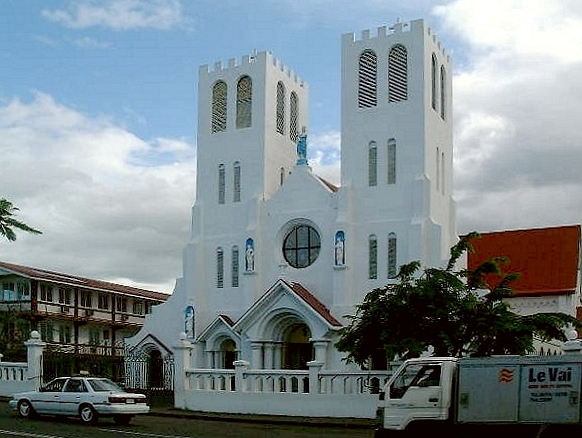
Catholic church in Apia

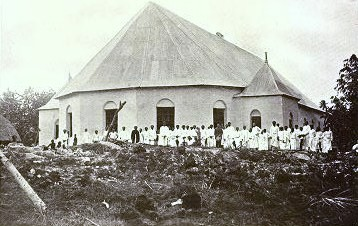
Stone church in Satupa'itea on Savai'i, circa 1908

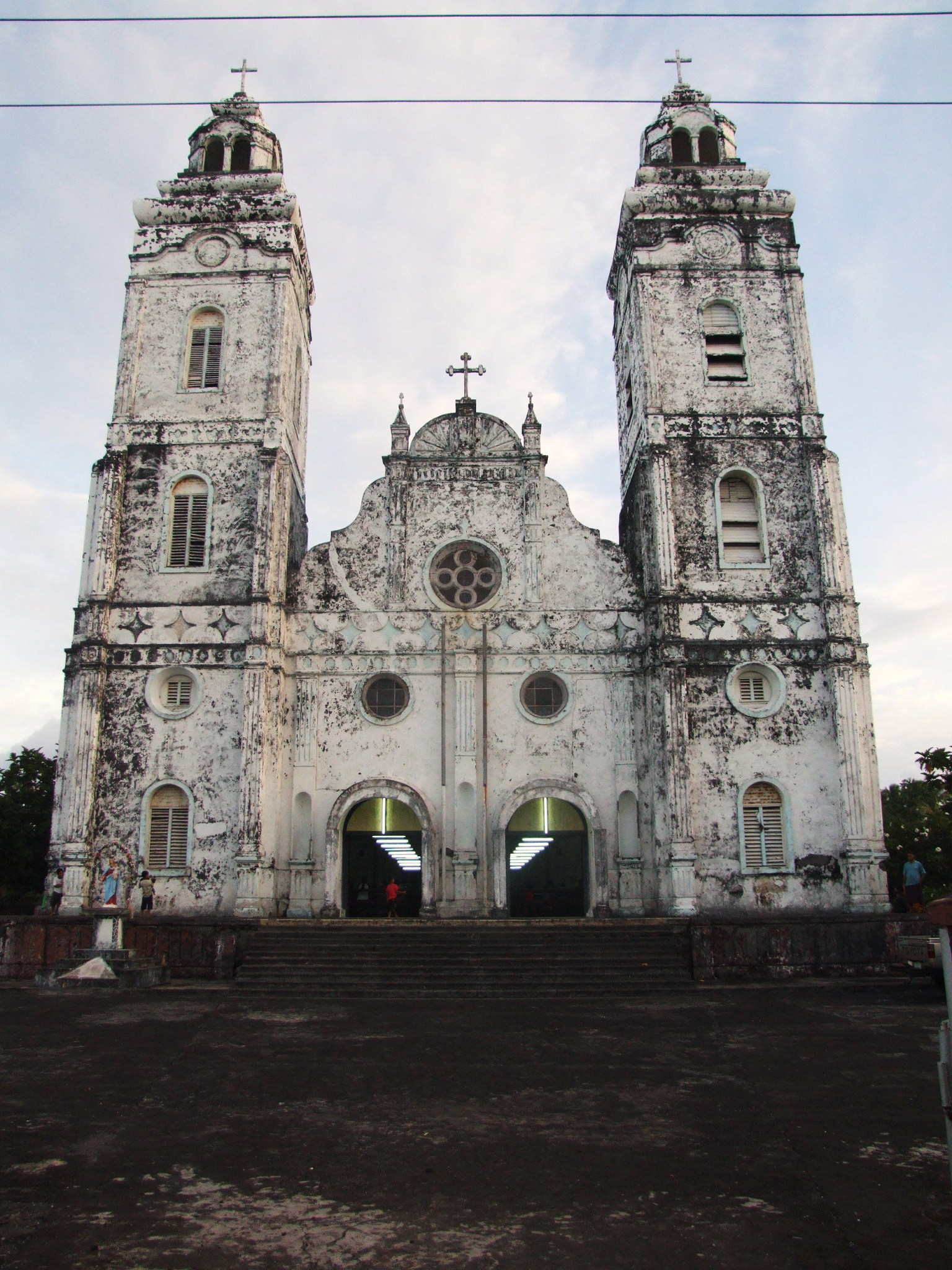
Historic church in Safotu village, Savai'i
Colonial buildings in Samoa

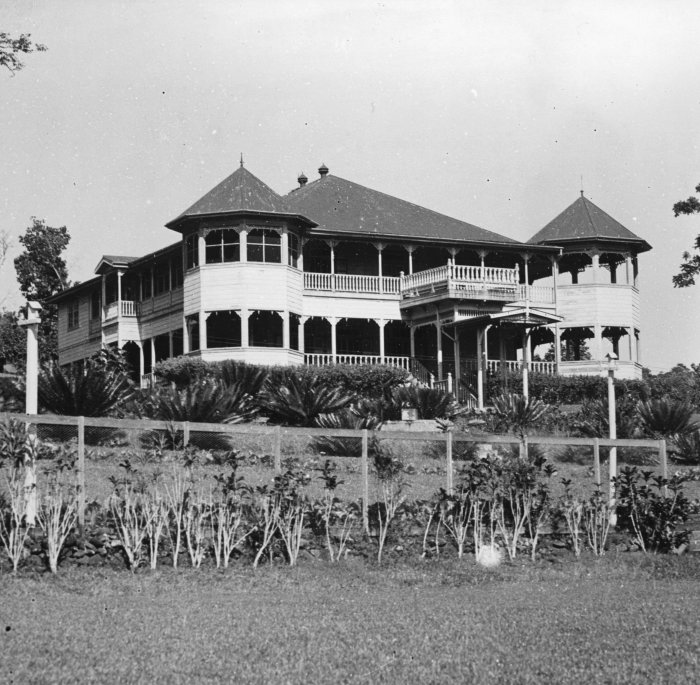
Home of Mau leader Olaf Frederick Nelson on Upolu island, circa 1936

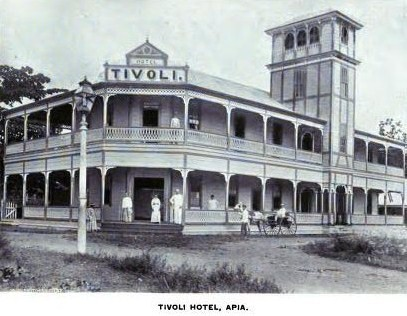
Tivoli Hotel in the capital Apia, 1896

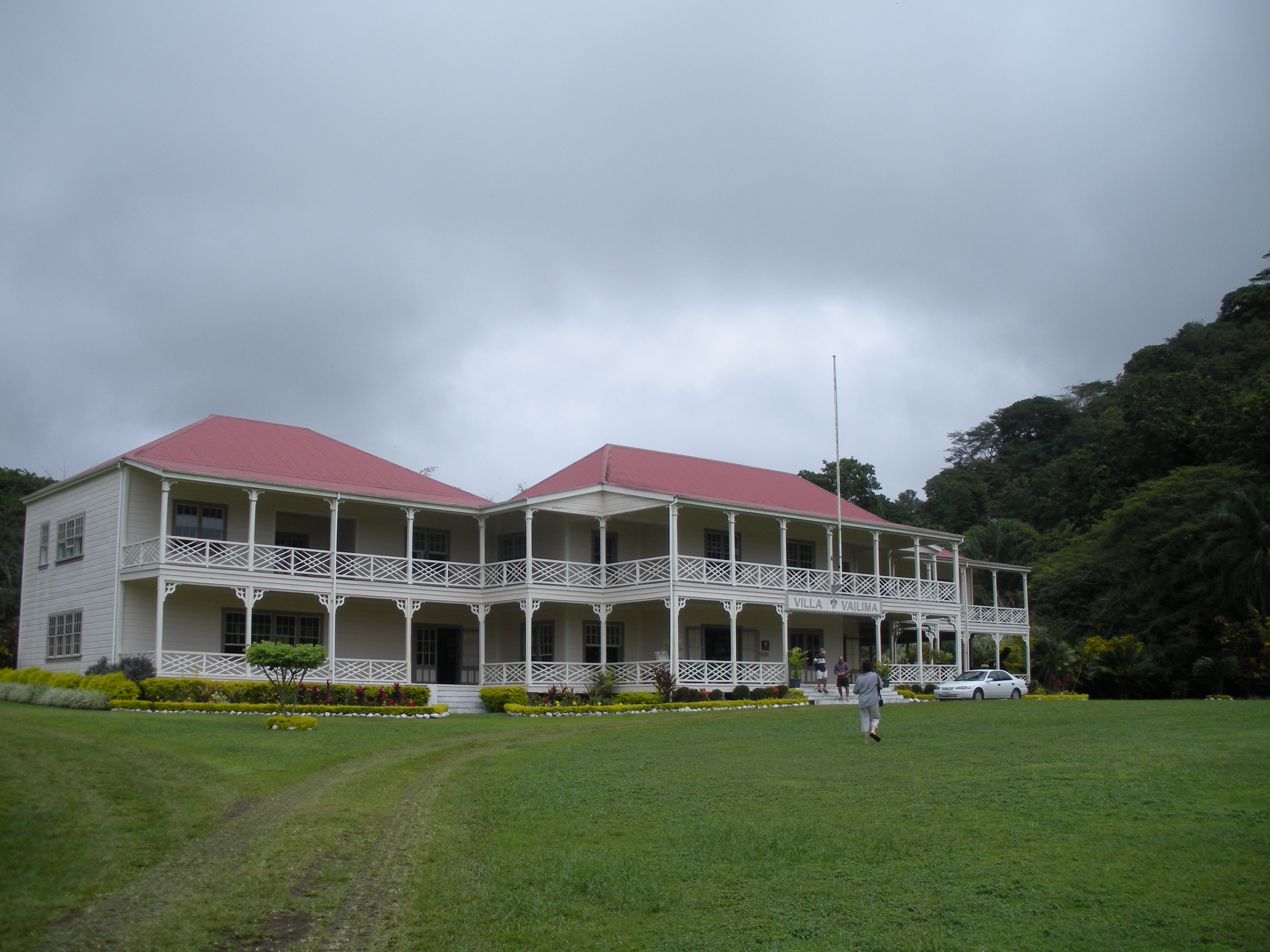
Vailima, home of writer Robert Louis Stevenson in Samoa

== See also ==
- Fa'amatai, the chiefly system of Samoa
- Culture of Samoa
- Hawaiian architecture
- Indigenous architecture
