= Pitonu'u =

Village

Coordinates: 13°45′21.8″S 172°19′22.61″W

Pitonu'u is a village on the island of Savai'i in Samoa. It is situated on the south coast of the island in the district of Satupa'itea and the electoral district of Satupa'itea. The population is 283.

The word pito nu'u means "a smaller part of a larger village" in the Samoan language.
