= Moasula =

Coordinates: 13°45′25.07″S 172°19′18.17″W

Moasula is a village on the island of Savai'i in Samoa. It is situated on the south coast of the island in the district of Satupa'itea. The population is 685.
