= Magimagi =

Fibrous product made from coconut husk

Magimagi is a fibrous product made from coconut husk.

The process of weaving the husk into the traditional look is very labor-intensive. The earliest record of the unique Magimagi design is listed in the Narrative of the United States Exploring Expedition by Wilkes (Wilkes, 1845). Concerning the huts named bures that were on the island Wilkes says, “The walls and roof of the mbure [bure] are constructed of canes about the size of a finger, and each one is wound round with sennit [Magimagi] as thick as cod-line, made from the cocoa-nut husk” (p. 119). The forefathers of the current inhabitants of the Vulaga islands used Magimagi in the construction of their houses and canoes. The unique weaved design is accomplished by Vulaga teams that are able to design many graphics into the look.

Magimagi coconut trees take about five years to bear fruit. The husks from the nuts are braided and woven into a strong, thin rope "as thick as a cod line". The Magimagi coconut only grows in the Lau group of island in the nation of Fiji Islands. It is used for art by the people of Vulaga.

== Types ==
There are three different types of weaving;

1. Talitali – this is the weaving that is done on horizontal beams.
2. Lalawa - this is the weaving that is done on vertical beams.
3. Malo/Lairo - this weaving is the design insert.
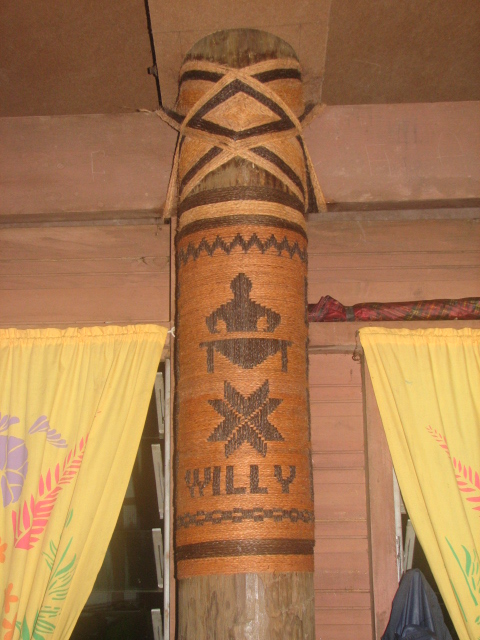

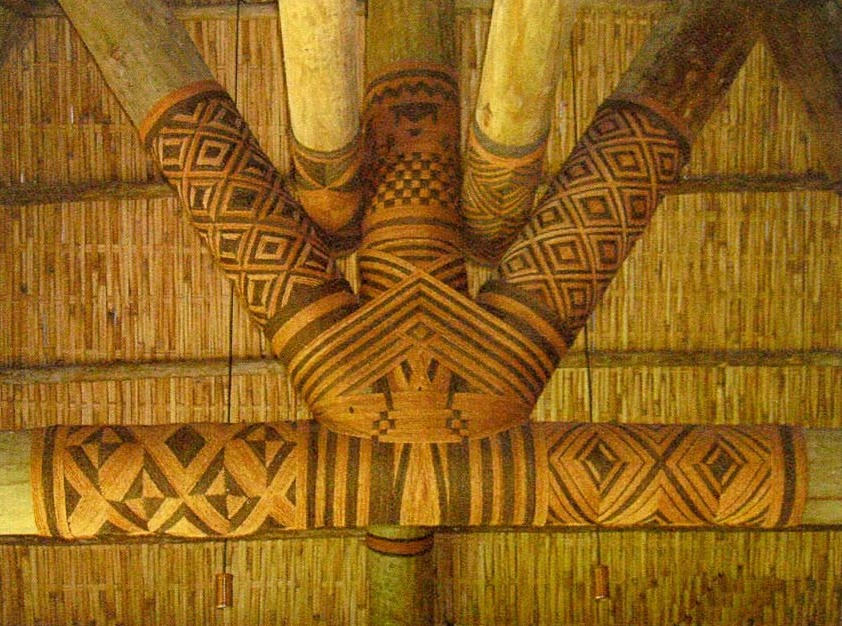

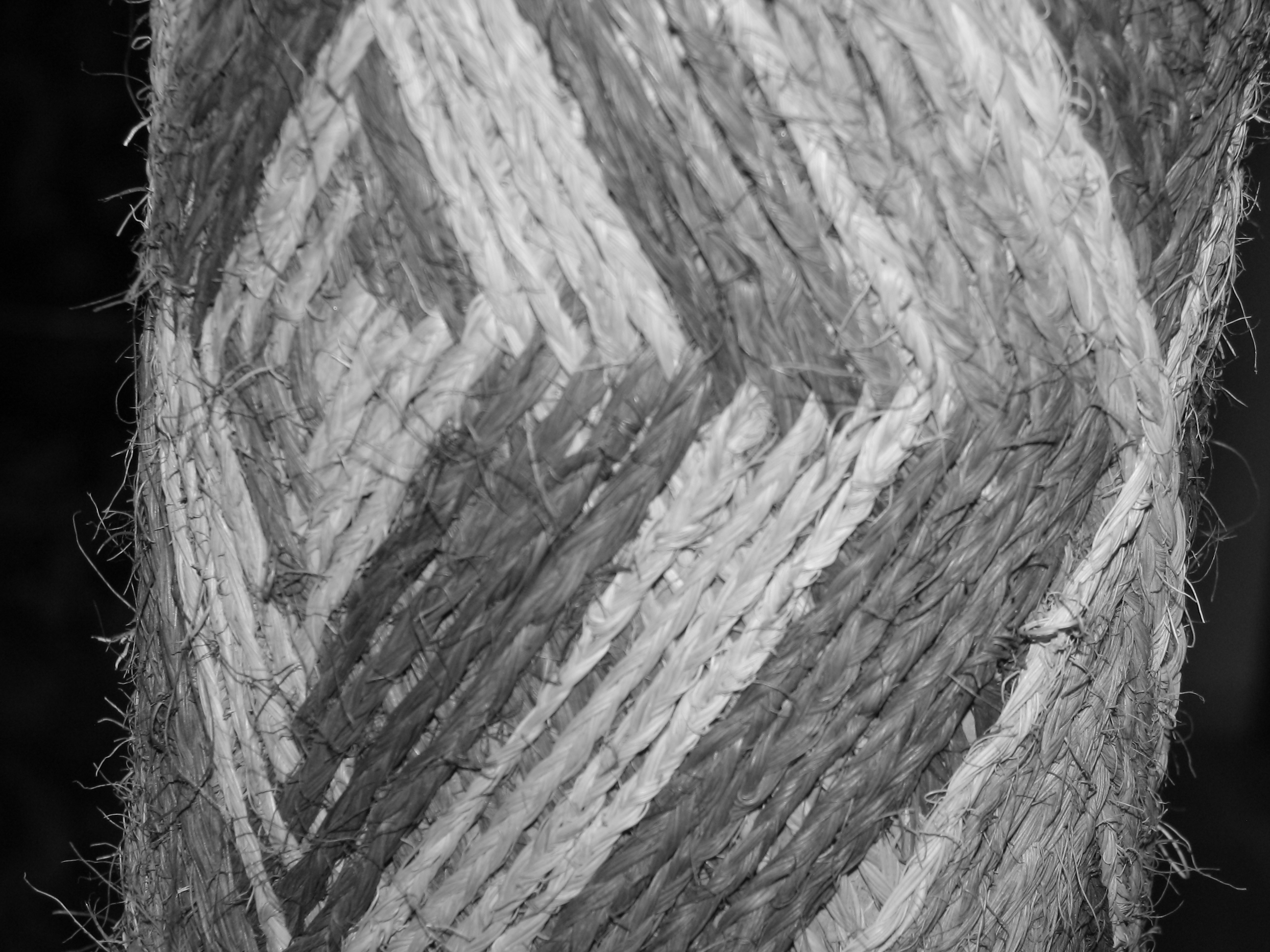

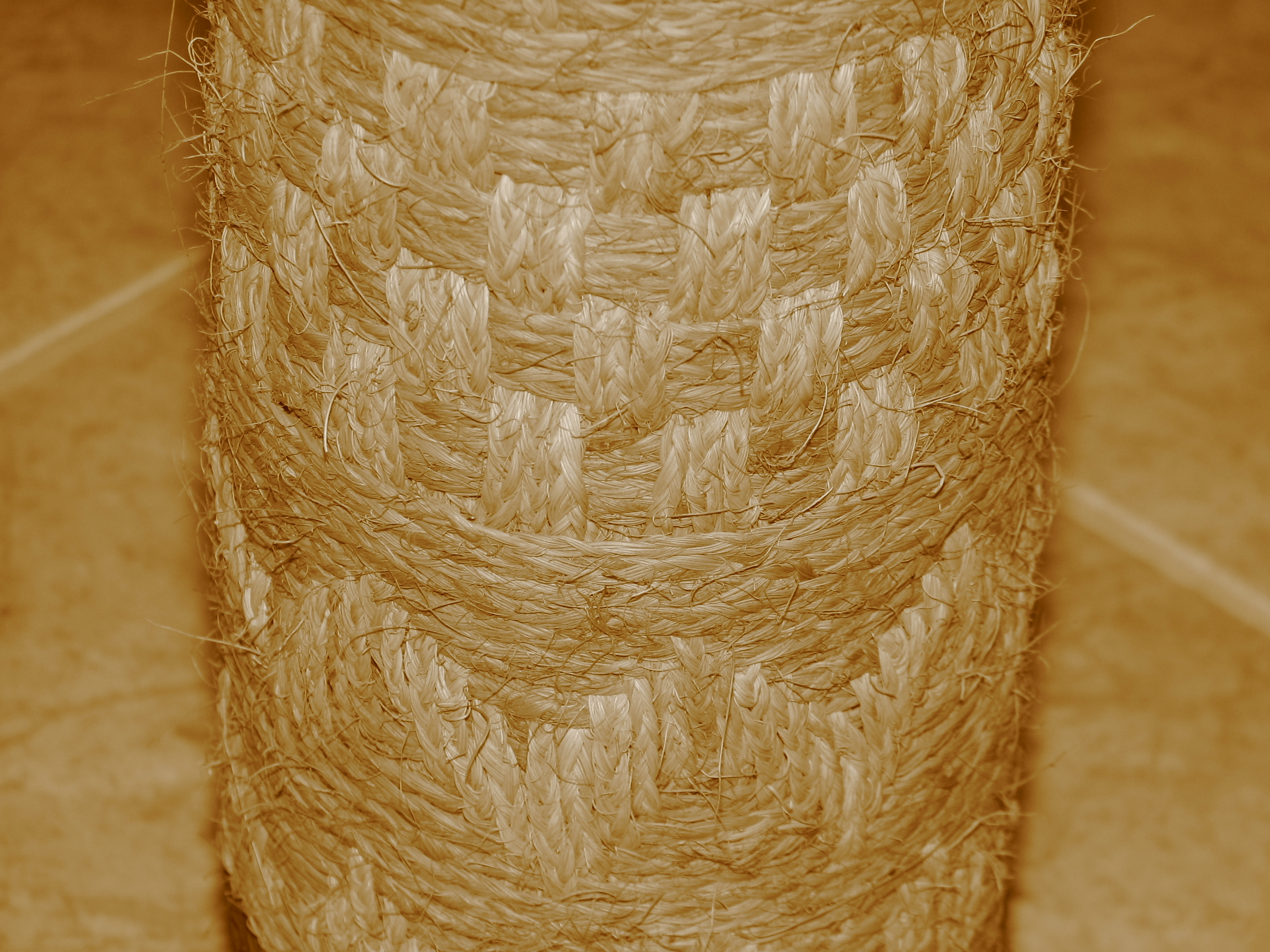

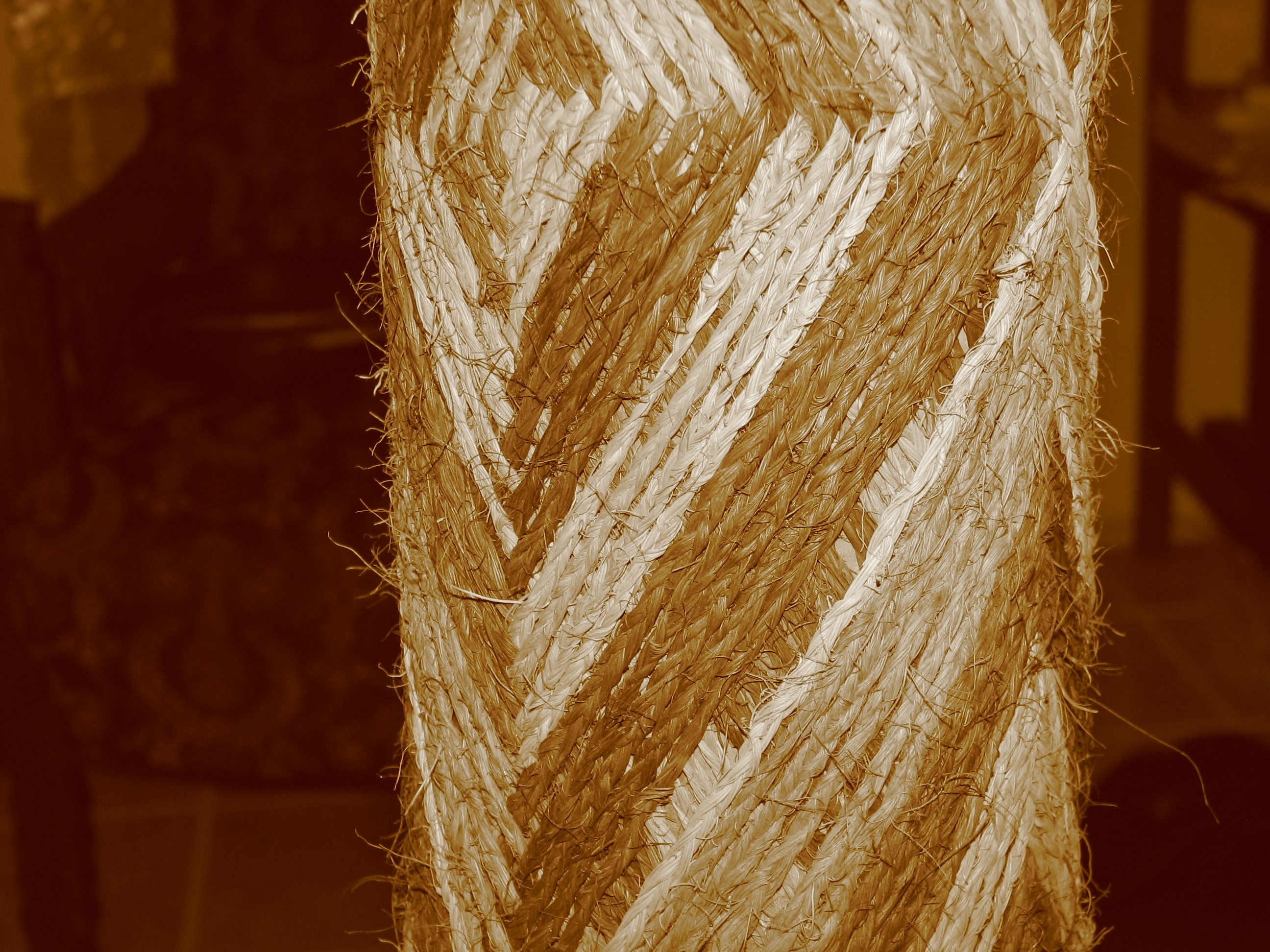

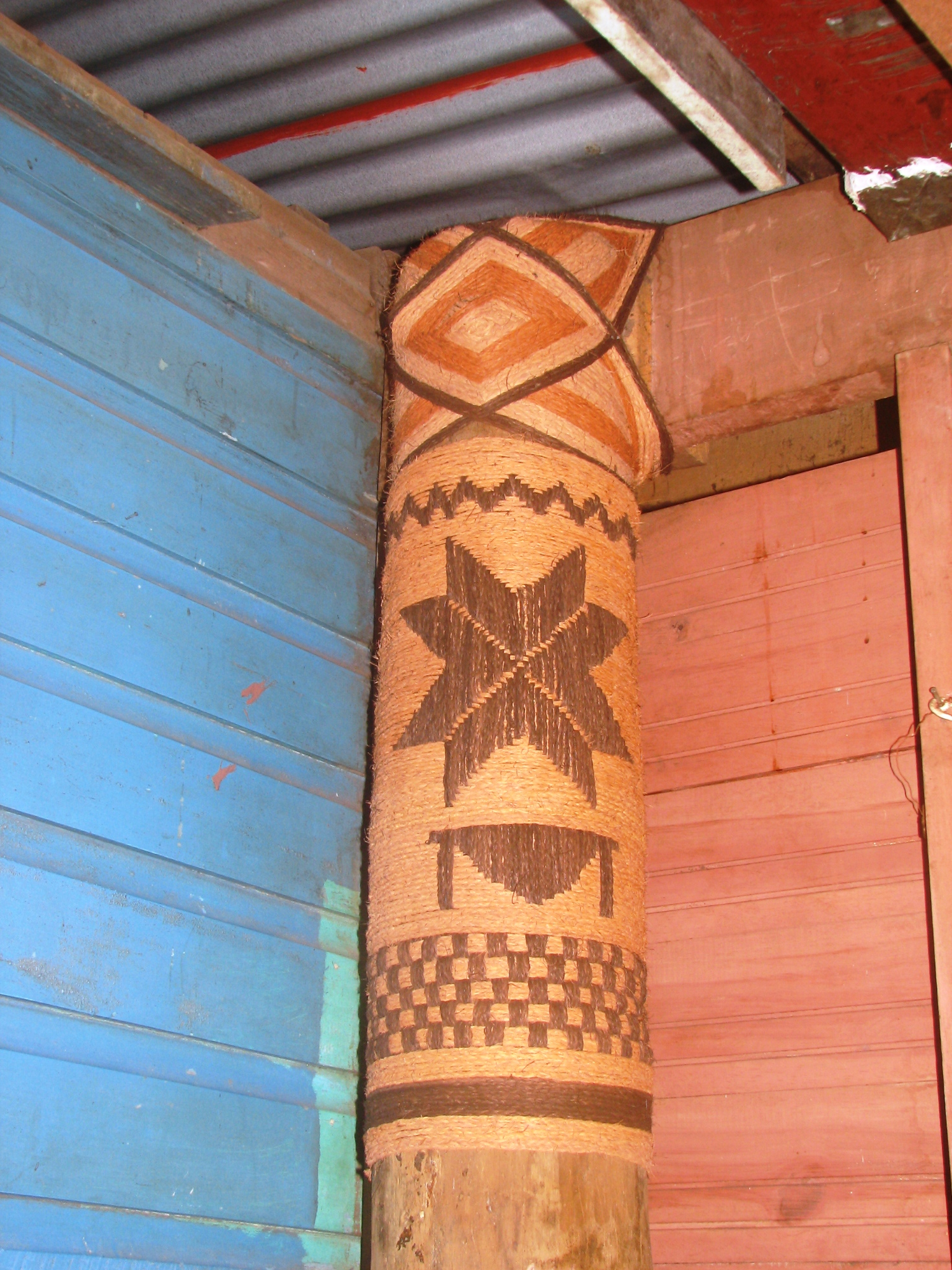

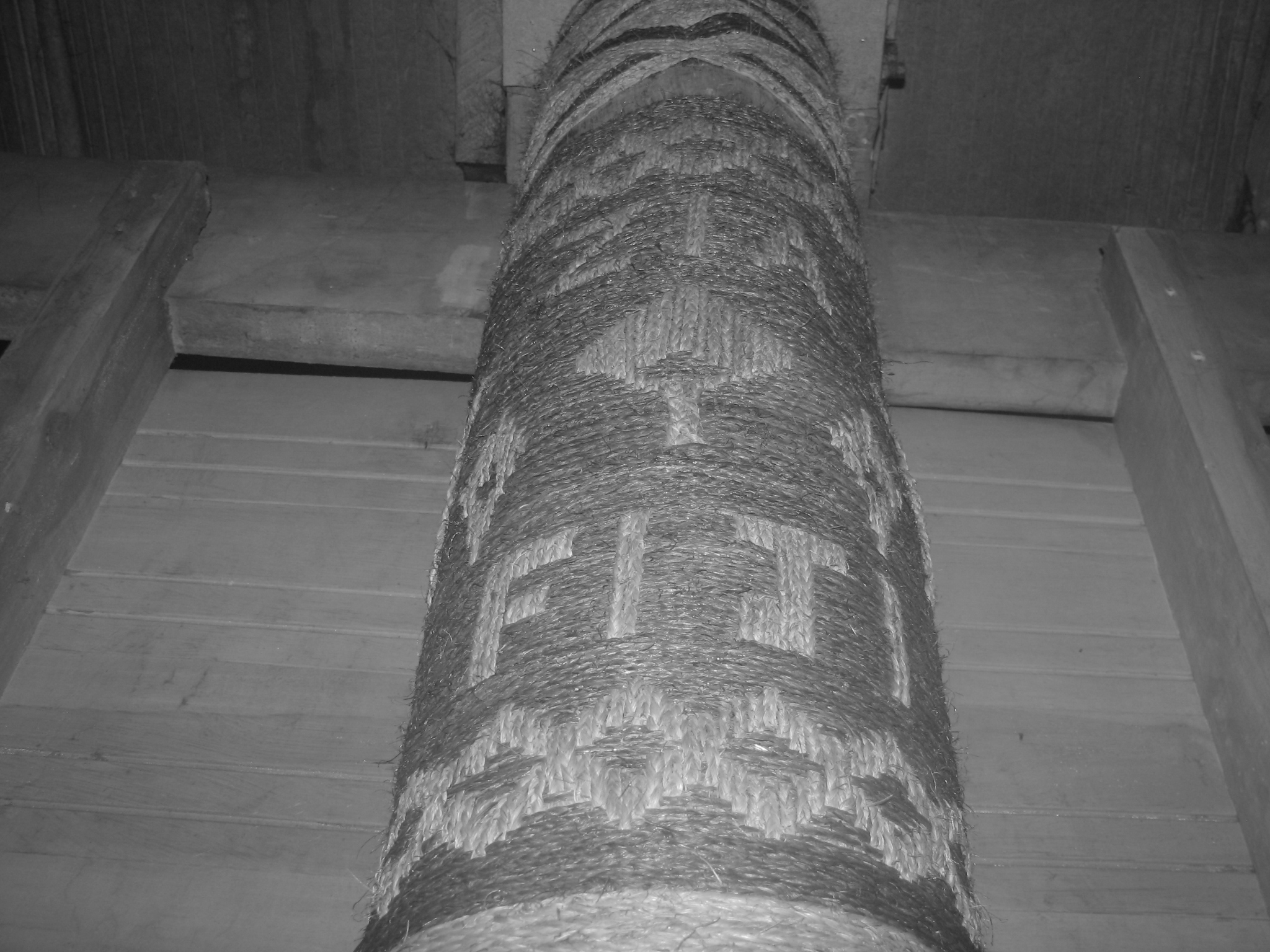

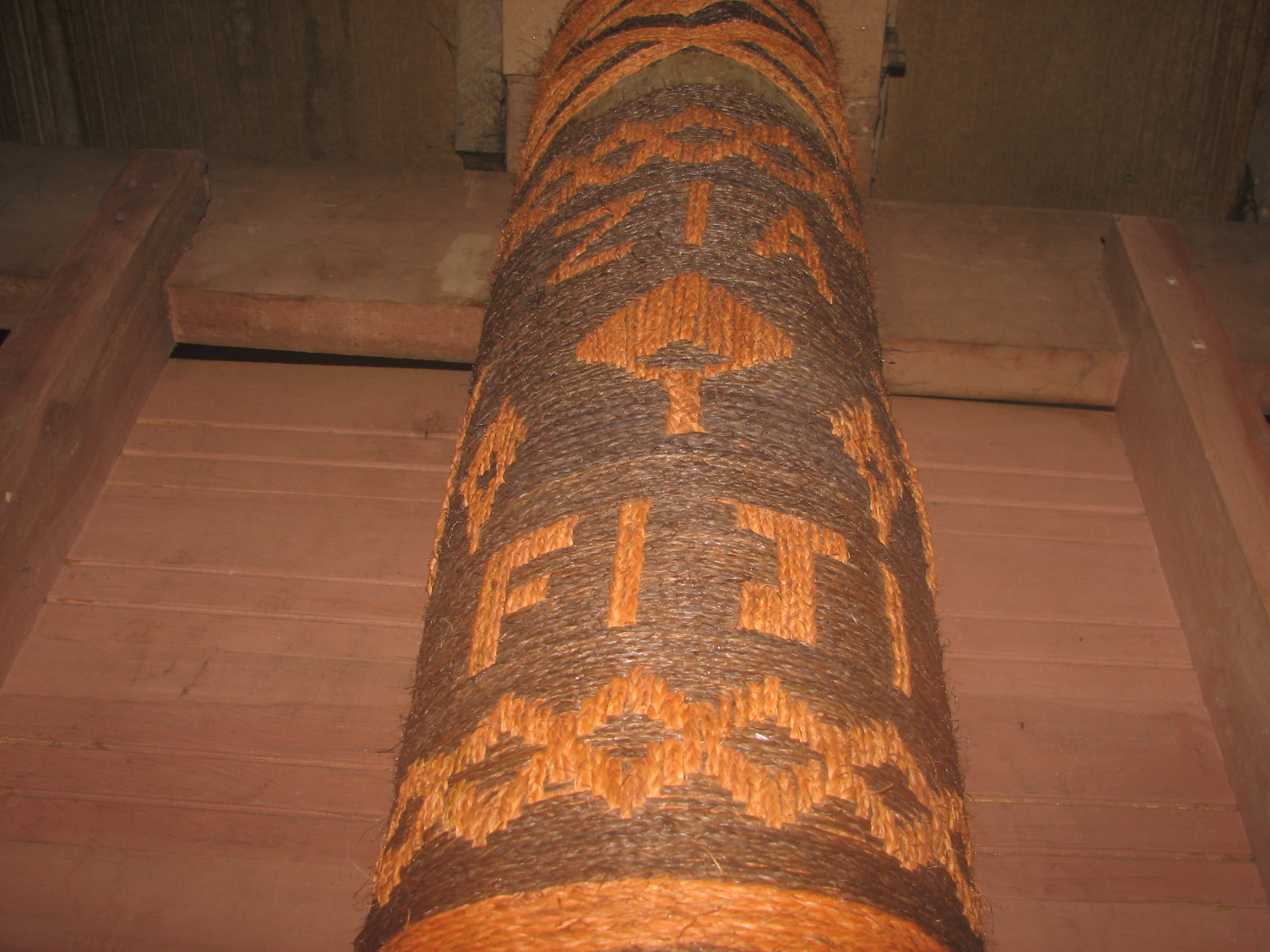

== Notable people ==
- Joana Monolagi - self-taught masi and magimagi artist.

== See also ==
- Architecture of Samoa
