= Satupaʻitea =

Coordinates: 13°38′S 172°38′W

- District
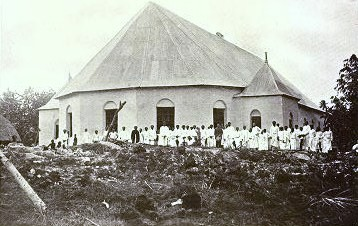
- Stone Methodist church, Satupa'itea c. 1908

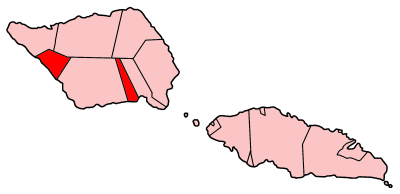
- Map of Samoa showing Satupaʻitea district
- Country: Samoa

Population (2016)
  - Total: 5,261
- Time zone: +13

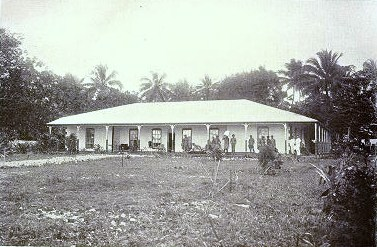
Mission house, Satupaʻitea, c. 1908

Satupaʻitea is a large village district with four sub-villages on the south east coast of Savaiʻi Island in Samoa.

In the country's modern political divisions, Satupaʻitea is also a Political District (Itumalo), one of 11 in the country, which now includes the traditional area of Salega.

== Satupaʻitea village enclave ==
The four villages in Satupaʻitea village enclave are Moasula, Pitonuʻu, Satufia and Vaega. The total population of Satupa'itea village enclave is 2112.

== Satupaʻitea Political District ==
In modern politics, Satupaʻitea district incorporates the larger traditional area of Salega (population 3,461).

Geographically, the district consists of two divisions separated by Palauli district.

The paramount chiefly title of the district is Tonumaipeʻa, with special relevance in the Alataua sub-district (the western half of the district).

== 19th century Methodist mission ==
During the 19th century, Satupaʻitea was an important stronghold for the early Methodist mission in Samoa. The English Methodist missionary George Brown (1835–1917) arrived in Samoa in 1860 and lived with his wife Lydia in Satupa'itea. They lived in a bamboo hut for the first two years and later constructed a mission house. In 1863, Brown began to train teachers at Satupa'itea for the ministry. The 'training' for the Methodist ministry was later established, in 1868, at Lufilufi on the north coast of Upolu island as the Piula Theological College.

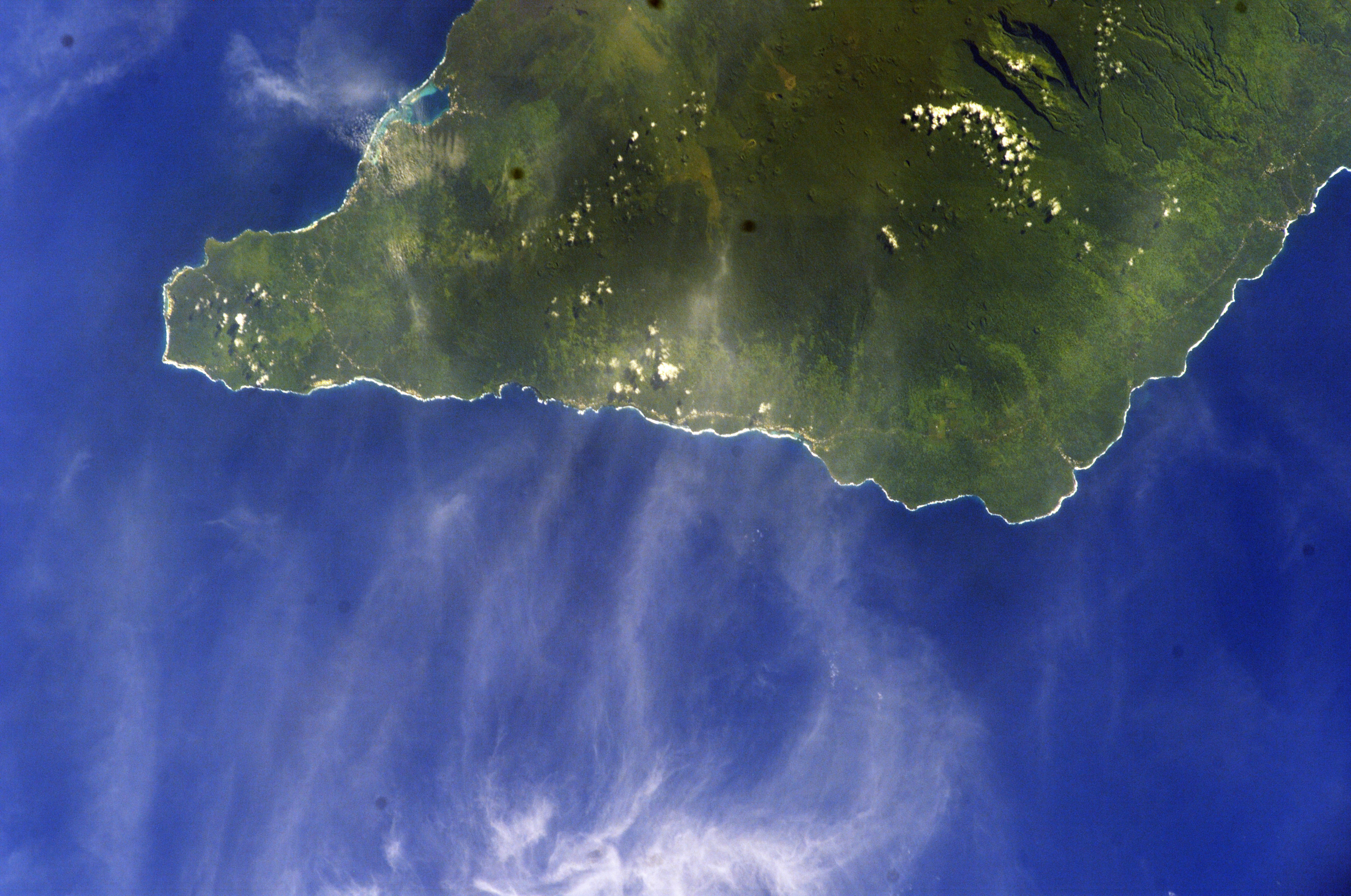
South west of Savaiʻi including Salega and parts of Satupaitea and Palauli. (NASA photo)

== Electoral results ==
2021 Samoan general election
Party	Candidate	Votes	%	±%
HRPP	Lautafi Fio Selafi Purcell	514	53.3	
HRPP	Tavui Asiata Tiafau Tafu Salevao	451	46.7	
HRPP hold				

2016 Samoan general election (uncontested)
Party	Candidate	Votes	%	±%
HRPP	Lautafi Fio Selafi Purcell			
HRPP hold				
