= Sennit =

Cordage made by plaiting strands of fibre

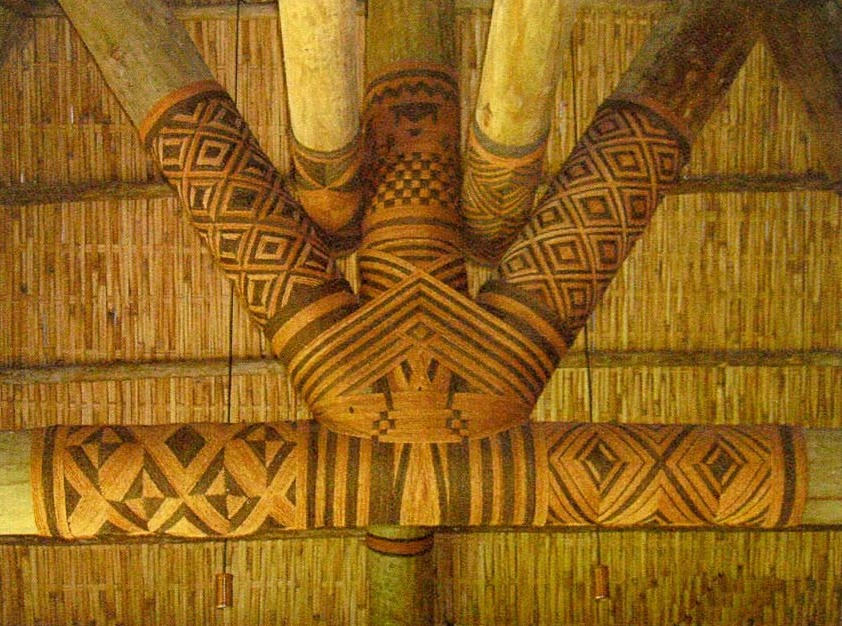
Magimagi sennit of Fiji around wooden ceiling posts.

Sennit is a type of cordage made by plaiting rope fibres or strands of dried fibre or grass. In western European nautical traditions, it was used to make flat plaited straps for use aboard ship. It can be used ornamentally in crafts, like a kind of macramé, or to make straw hats. Sennit is an important material in the cultures of Oceania, where it is used in traditional architecture, boat building, fishing and as an ornamentation.

== Oceania ==
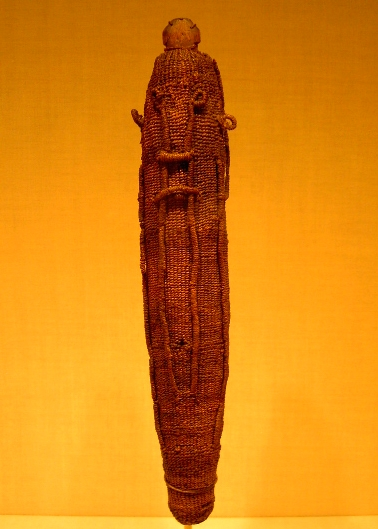
A sacred god figure wrapping in sennit for the Tahitian war god 'Oro.

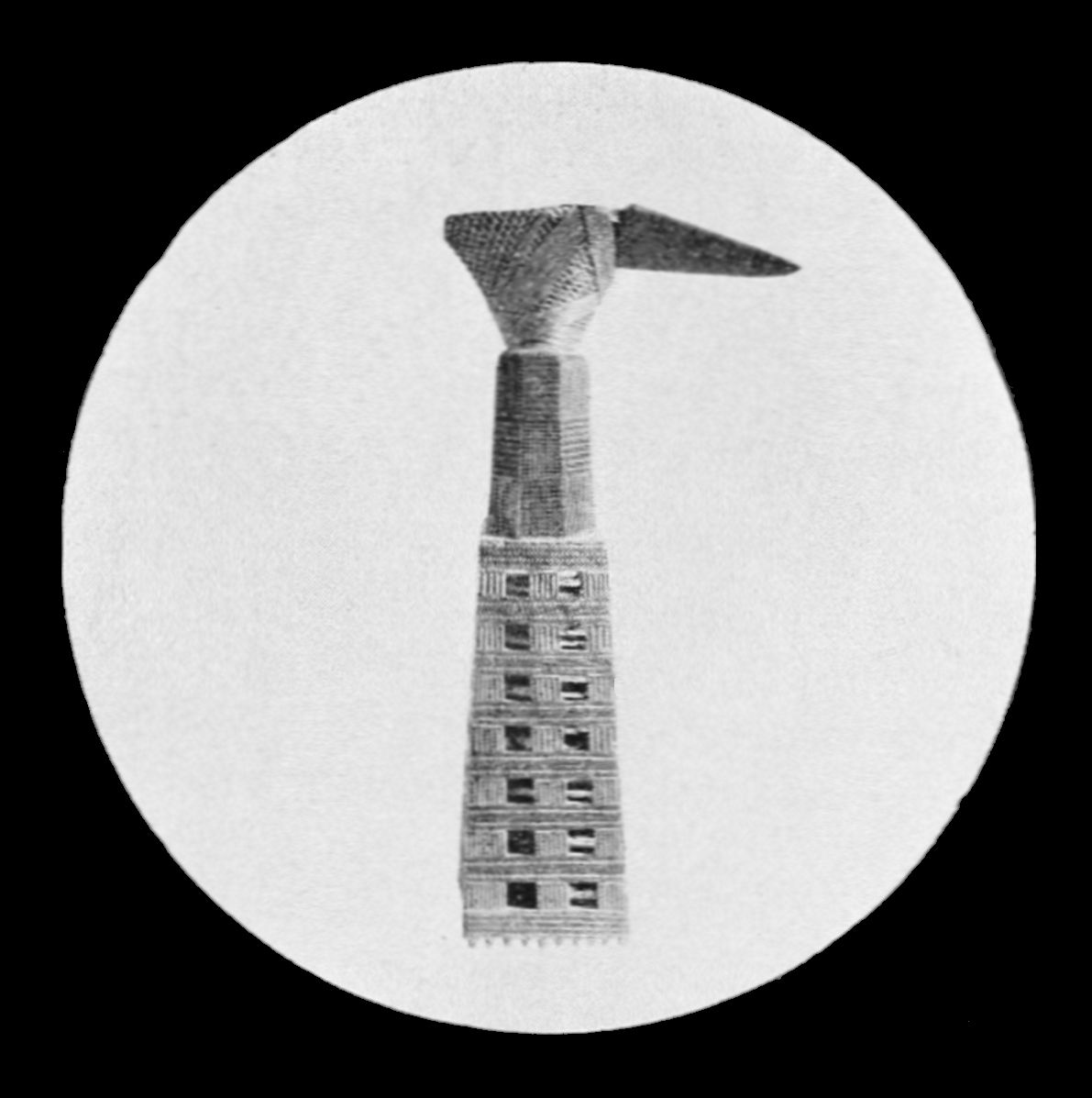
Polynesian ceremonial stone adze (toʻi or toki in Polynesian languages) lashed in sennit around the blade with carved handle, 1891-1892

=== Tonga ===
Sennit in Tonga is called kafa.

=== Fiji ===
The Fijian term used is magimagi, a craft product of the Fiji Islands.

=== Hawai'i ===
The term is also used in Hawaii and throughout Polynesia for cordage made by braiding the fibers of coconut husks. It was important in attaching the ʻama (outrigger float) via the iako (spars) to the hull of canoes, stones to war-club handles, erecting hale (houses), etc.

=== Samoa ===
In the Samoan language, sennit is called ʻafa. It was used as cordage in the construction of traditional Samoan architecture, boat building with many other functional uses. ʻAfa is handmade from dried coconut fibre from the husk of certain varieties of coconuts with long fibres, particularly the niuʻafa (afa palm).

Sennit is mentioned in Robert Gibbings' book Over the Reefs (1948). He refers to its use in Samoa in 1946, where he was able to observe its being made on many occasions. He notes that its crafting was a constant occupation in Samoan villages, because so much of the material was required. A significant quote from the book, made by a village chief to Gibbings, emphasises the importance of sennit in Samoan culture: "In your country," said a chief to me, "only a few men can make nails, but in Samoa, everyone can make nails" (p. 118). He was referring to the sennit that is used to bind the structures or huts in which they lived. Sennit had a variety of other uses, including in shark fishing, where it was used as a noose that was placed over the shark's head as it came alongside the canoe.

"They showed me the sennit noose they had used—five years old and as good as new. They said it would last another five years if cared for." Robert Gribbings.

== See also ==
- Chain sinnet
- Sennit hat
