= Piula Theological College =

Methodist training institution in Samoa

Coordinates: 13°52′25.63″S 171°35′49.52″W

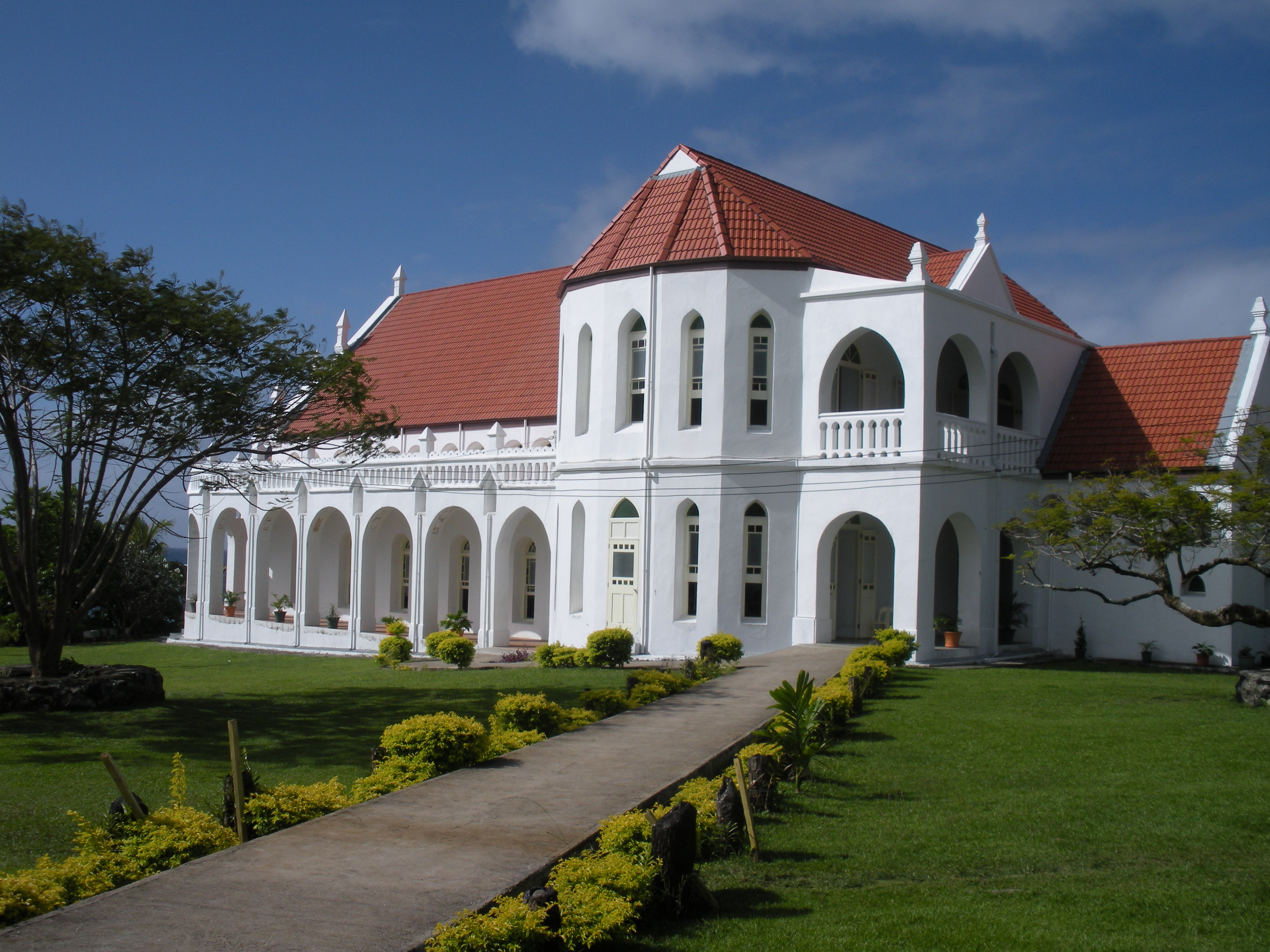
Piula Chapel

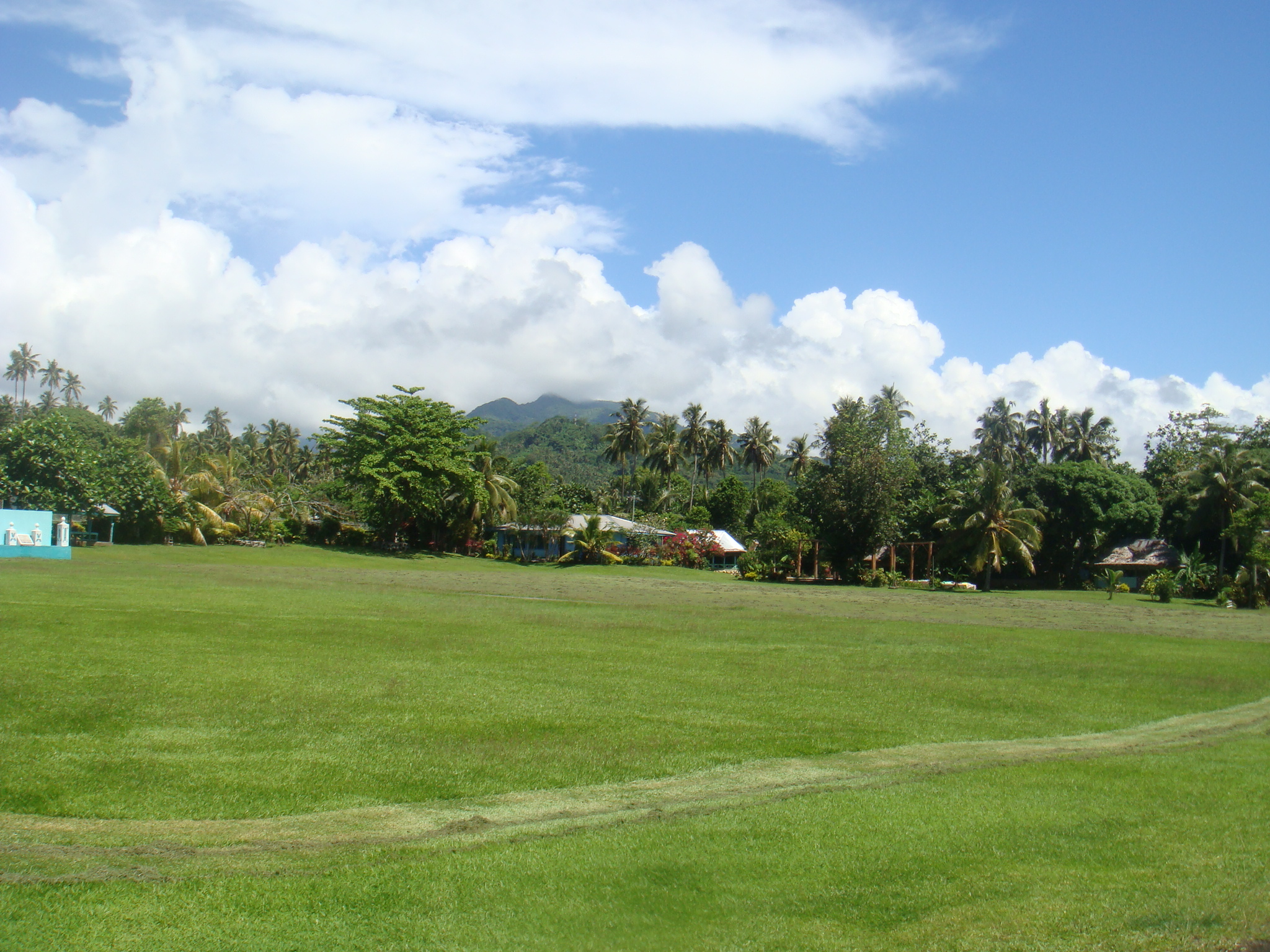
College grounds

Piula Theological College is a Methodist training institution in Samoa. It was established in 1868 in Lufilufi on the north coast of Upolu island after its initial beginnings in 1859 at Satupa'itea on the south coast of Savai'i island. The Methodist Mission in Samoa purchased the land at the Methodist leaning district and later named their training center Piula Theological College. The name Piula is a transliteration of the biblical name Beulah which means married (to the Lord).

The college includes the recently renovated historic Piula chapel, large open grounds, and Samoan fale. At the front of the chapel are steps leading down to the sea where Fatumea, the oval Piula Cave Pool is, a popular swimming hole for locals and visitors.

== History ==
In Samoa, the Methodist religion is referred to as 'lotu tonga' through the early initial contact with converts and the church's mission in Tonga during the early 19th century.

The decision to set up the training institution came about from an annual church meeting held on Manono Island, a stronghold of the church at the time, on 21 September 1859.

A key figure during the early years of the Methodist church in Samoa was the Rev. George Brown who lived in Samoa for 14 years, between 1860 and 1874. He worked with his wife Lydia at the mission in Satupa'itea on Savai'i island. Brown learned the Samoan language and regarded the people as his friends. Like many other missionaries to the Pacific, Brown recorded his experience in Samoa in journals which include significant historical information about the Methodist church and Samoan history and culture.

== Academics ==
The theological college offers a four-year course leading to a Diploma in Theological Studies with the possibility of going on to secure a Bachelor of Divinity degree. The training prepares people for Ministry in the Samoa Methodist Church. Some of the students are married and the wives undertake courses to prepare them for the role they will play as minister's wives.

A guiding principle to all college activity has been the notion that Piula should be, as near as possible, a Christian village. Students are taught how to take part in a proper manner in Samoan custom and society.

== Location ==
On Upolu island, the college is 26 km east along the northern coastal road from the capital Apia. Entry to the campus is through a blue and yellow painted stone wall beside the main island road.

Gallery

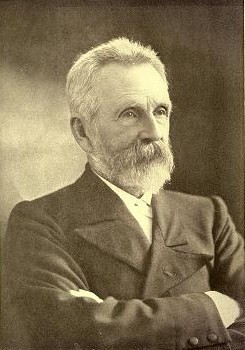
George Brown (1835-1917), a founder of the college.

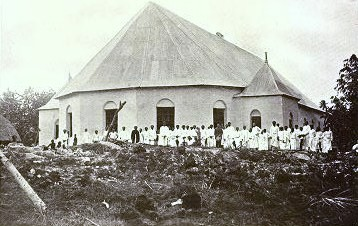
Methodist stone church, Satupa'itea, c. 1908

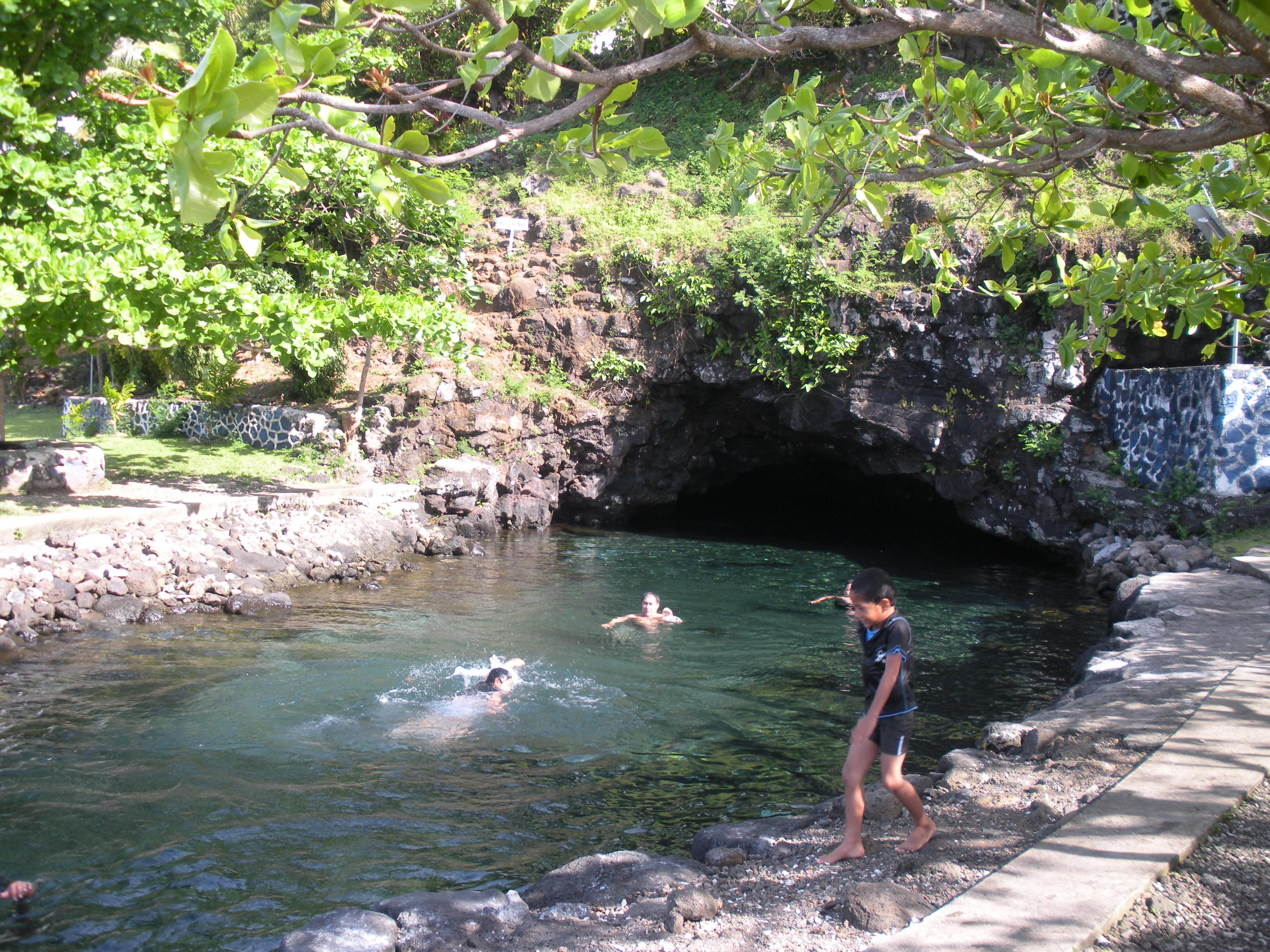
Piula Cave Pool by the sea below the chapel.

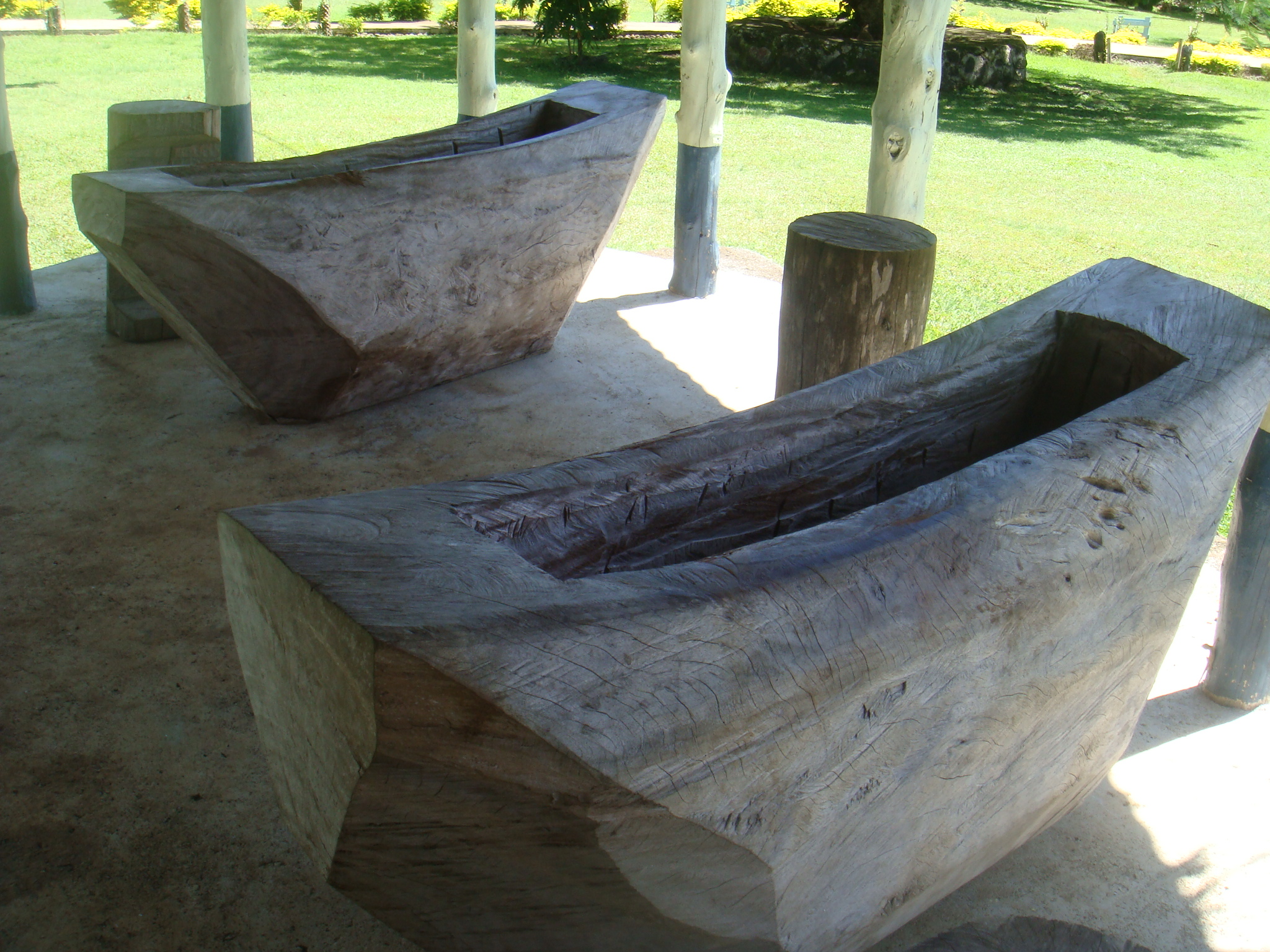
Lali, Samoan wooden log drums, each 2m long used to beat out sound and signal times.

== See also ==
- Religion in Samoa
- Architecture of Samoa
- History of Samoa
- German Samoa
