= Satufia =

Village on Savai'i in Samoa

Coordinates: 13°46′26.03″S 172°19′38.88″W

Satufia is a village on the island of Savai'i in Samoa. It is situated on the south coast of the island in the district of Satupa'itea and the electoral district of Satupa'itea. The population is 573.
