= George Brown (missionary) =

English missionary and ethnographer (1835–1917)

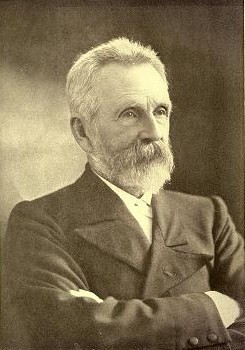
Rev George Brown circa 1908

George Brown (7 December 1835 – 7 April 1917) was an English Methodist missionary and ethnographer.

== Early life and education ==
George Brown was born in Barnard Castle, County Durham, England. He was the son of George Brown, barrister, and his wife Elizabeth, née Dixon. Elizabeth's sister Sarah was married to Rev. Thomas Buddle, a missionary in New Zealand. Brown reacted badly to his stepmother's discipline and attempted to run away to sea.

== Conversion and missionary work ==
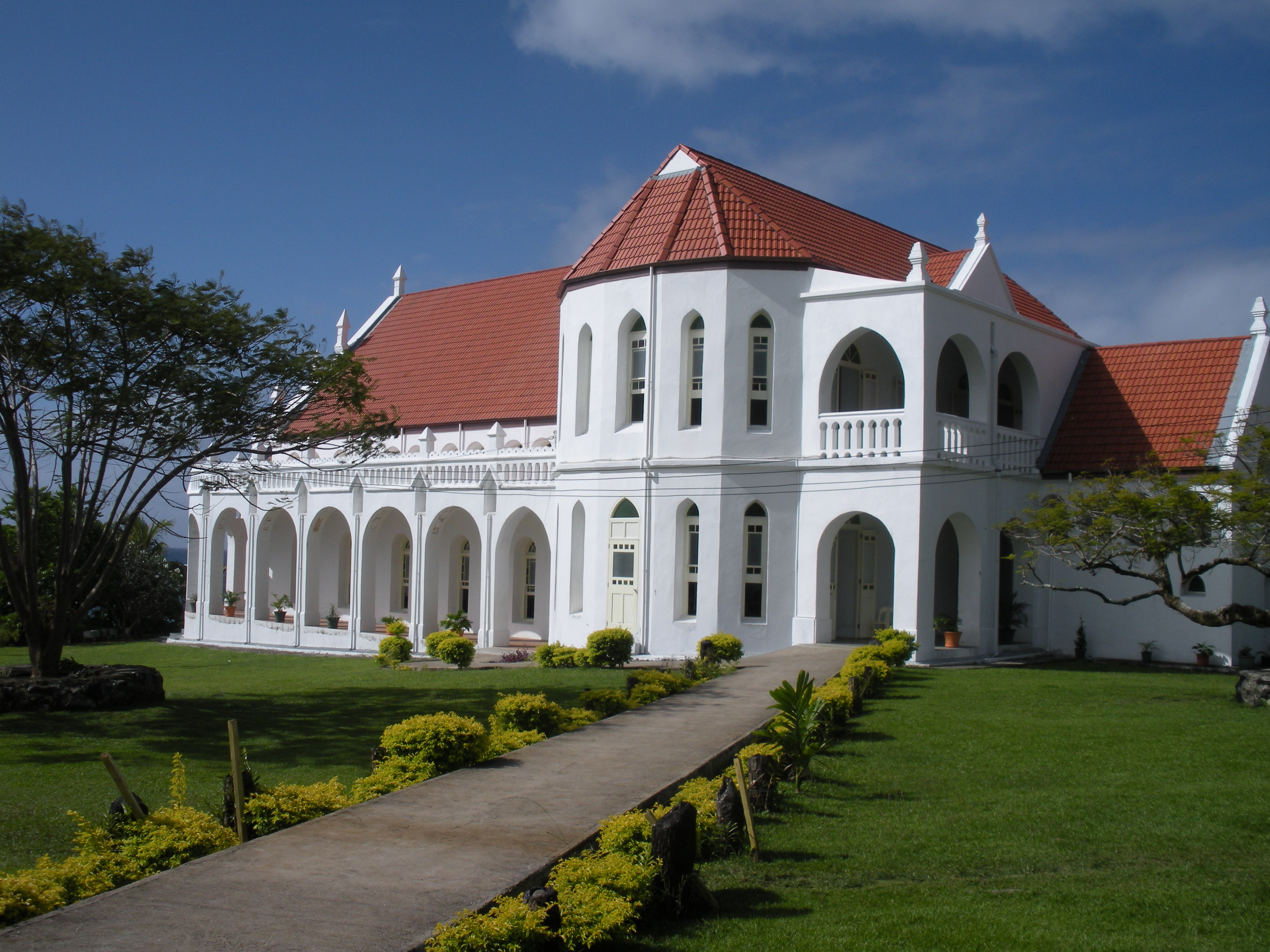
Piula Theological College in Samoa

He lived in Samoa between 1860 and 1874, mostly on the island of Savai'i. He learned the language and wrote about Samoan culture.

Brown was a key figure in the early days of training Samoans for the ministry and the establishment of Piula Theological College on the north coast of Upolu Island in Samoa. Brown began writing his manuscript journals in Samoa, recording his experience as a missionary in the Pacific.

He had declined an offer by his friend, Robert Louis Stevenson, to write his biography.

Ten volumes of Brown's manuscript journals survive.

Brown died at Sydney on 7 April 1917..

== Zoological specimens ==
Brown was also a collector of plants and some animals. The George Brown Collection, with over 800 ethnographic samples, is housed in the National Museum of Ethnography, Osaka, Japan.

== See also ==
- Mary Elizabeth Brown
