= List of cities, towns and villages in Samoa =

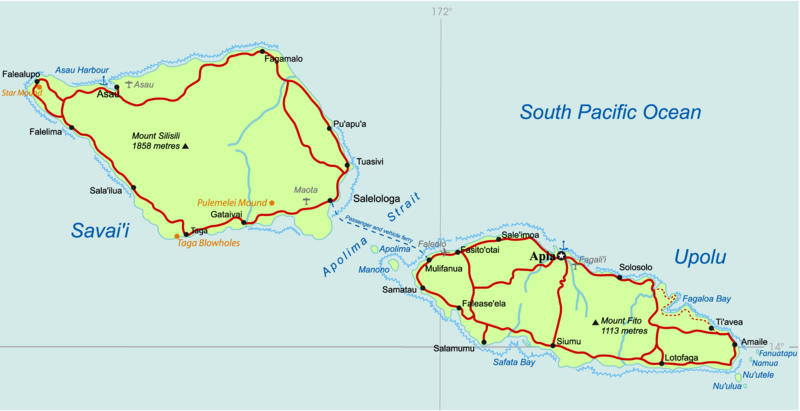
Map of Samoa

This article shows a list of cities, towns and villages in Samoa. It includes settlements in the two main Western Samoan islands of Upolu and Savaiʻi. Most towns and villages are located in the level areas of the islands, near the ocean.

== List ==
=== Main townships ===
- Apia, capital of Samoa situated on Upolu island.
- Salelologa, main 'township' & ferry terminal on Savai'i island.

=== Villages ===
- Afega
- Afiamalu
- Alafua
- Alamagoto
- Aleipata
- Aleisa
- Amaile
- Amouli
- Aopo
- Apai
- Apolima Tai
- Apolima Uta
- Asaga
- Asau
- Auala
- A'ufaga
- Aele
- Elisefou
- Faiaai
- Faatoia
- Faga
- Fagali'i
- Fagaloa
- Fagamalo
- Falealili
- Falealupo
- Faleasiu
- Faleatiu
- Falefa
- Falelatai
- Falelima
- Fale'olo
- Falease'ela, Lefaga
- Faletagaloa
- Faleu
- Faleula
- Falevao
- Faleapuna
- Fasito'otai
- Fasito'outa
- Fatausi
- Foailuga
- Foailalo
- Fogapoa
- Fogasavai'i
- Fogatuli
- Fuailoloo
- Fusi
- Gataivai
- Iva
- Lalomauga
- Lano
- Lalomalava
- Lalomanu
- Lalovaea
- Laulii
- Leauva'a
- Lefaga
- Lefagoali'i
- Lepea
- Lepa
- Letava
- Letogo
- Leiifiifi
- Leufisa
- Leulumoega
- Leulumoega Fou
- Lotofaga, Aleipata
- Lotofagā, Safata
- Lona, Fagaloa
- Luatuanu'u
- Lufilufi
- Magiagi
- Malie
- Malifa
- Malua
- Manase
- Manono
- Manunu
- Matafaa
- Matatufu
- Matautu
- Matautu, Falealili
- Matautu, Lefaga
- Matautu-tai
- Matautu-uta
- Moata'a
- Moamoa
- Motootua
- Mulinuʻu
- Musumusu
- Mutiatele
- Magiagi
- Neiafu
- Nofoali'i

Olosega (vaisaili, satui, vaiapi, pouono)

- Palauli
- Patamea
- Poutasi
- Puapua
- Puipa'a
- Pesega
- Saaga
- Saasaai
- Saipipi
- Safotu
- Safotulafai
- Safune
- Sagone
- Salailua
- Salamumu
- Salani
- Saleamua
- Saleaula
- Saleilua
- Saleimoa
- Salelavalu Tai
- Salelavalu Uta
- Salelologa
- Saletele
- Salesatele
- Salua
- Samamea
- Samata I Tai
- Samata Uta
- Samatau
- Samusu
- Safaato'a, Lefaga
- Saoluafata
- Sapapali'i
- Sapunaoa
- Sapo'e
- Satalo
- Sataoa
- Satapuala
- Sataua
- Satitoa
- Satoʻalepai
- Satupa'itea
- Satuimalufilufi
- Sauniatu
- Savalalo
- Savaia
- Siufaga
- Siuniu
- Siumu
- Sinamoga
- Sogi
- Solosolo
- Ta’u (fitiuta, faleasao, luma, Siufaga)
- Tafatafa
- Tafua
- Tafagamanu
- Tafaigata
- Tafitoala
- Tafuna
- Taga
- Tanugamanono
- Tapueleele
- Toomatagi
- Tuana'i
- Tufulele
- Tufutafoe
- Uafato
- Utualii
- Utulaelae, Falealili
- Vaiala
- Vaigaga
- Vailima
- Vailoa
- Vailu'utai
- Vaimoso
- Vaiola
- Vaisala
- Vaisigano
- Vaiee
- Vaito'omuli
- Vaitele
- Vaiusu
- Vaivase Tai
- Vaivase Uta
- Vavau
- Vailele
- Vaipu'a
- Vaipuna
- Vaoala
- Ulutogia
- Ulai
- Vaitogi
- Aasufou
- Nua ma Se'etaga
- Toamua
- Puipaa
- Sagapu
- Fagagasi
- Salu
- Saina
- Tia'vea
- Saleapaga
- Taufusi

== See also ==
- Districts of Samoa
