= List of schools in Savaiʻi =

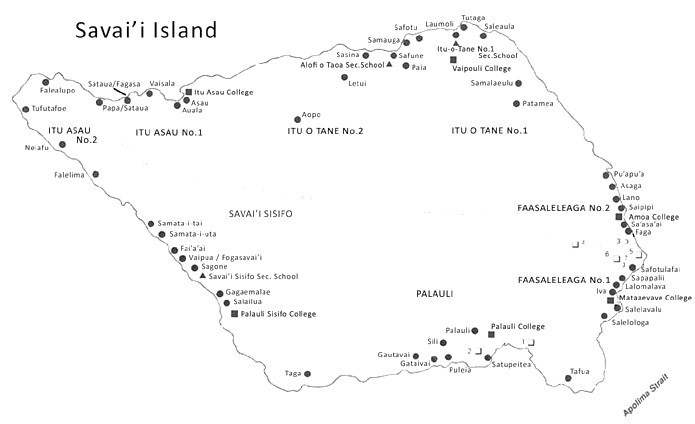
Map of Savai'i schools, 2009

This is a list of schools in Savai'i island, Samoa.

Education in Samoa is compulsory for children aged 5-years to 14-years or until the completion of Year 8. It consists mainly of public schools administered by the government and villages. There are 9 secondary schools and 48 primary schools in Savai'i.

- Primary education - Year 1 - 8 (8-years)
- Secondary education - Year 9 - 13 (5-years)

== Secondary schools ==
Secondary schools and colleges on Savai'i island listed by the Samoa government's Ministry of Education, Sport and Culture.

School	Locality/Village	School District	District	Years	Gender	Type
Amoa College	Saipipi	Fa'asaleleaga No. 2 school district	Fa'asaleleaga	9 - 13	Coeducational	Public school
Mata'aevave College	Iva	Fa'asaleleaga No. 1 school district	Fa'asaleleaga	9 - 13	Coeducational	Public school
Alofi o Taoa Secondary School	near Safune	Itu-o-Tane No. 2 school district	Gaga'ifomauga	9 - 13	Coeducational	Public school
Itu Asau College	Asau	Itu Asau school district	Vaisigano	9 - 13	Coeducational	Public school
Savai'i Sisifo College		Savai'i Sisifo school district	Satupa'itea	9 - 13	Coeducational	Public school
Palauli Sisifo College	Salailua	Savai'i Sisifo school district	Palauli	9 - 13	Coeducational	Public school
Palauli College		Palauli School district	Palauli	9 - 13	Coeducational	Public school
Itu o Tane Secondary School	Avao	Itu o Tane No. 1 school district	Gaga'emauga	9 - 13	Coeducational	Public school
Vaipouli College	Matautu	Itu o Tane No. 1 school district	Gaga'emauga	9 - 13	Coeducational	Public school

== Primary schools ==
There are 48 primary schools in Savai'i located in different school districts around the island.

School District	School	Locality/Village
Itu Asau No. 1	Asau Primary School	Asau
	Auala Primary School	Auala
	Papa/Sataua Primary School	Papa Uta/Sataua
	Sataua/Fagasa Primary School	Sataua/Fagasa
	Vaisala Primary School	Vaisala
Itu Asau No. 2	Falealupo Primary School	Falealupo
	Falelima Primary School	Falelima
	Neiafu Primary School	Neiafu
	Tufutafoe Primary School	Tufutafoe
Savai'i Sisifo	Fai'a'ai Primary School	Fai'a'ai
	Gagaemalae Primary School	
	Sagone Primary School	Sagone
	Salailua Primary School	Salailua
	Samata-i-Tai Primary School	Samata-i-Tai
	Samata-i-Uta Primary School	Samata-i-Uta
	Taga Primary School	Taga
	Fogasavai'i Primary School	Fogasavai'i
Palauli	Gataivai Primary School	Gataivai
	Gautavai Primary School	Gautavai
	Palauli Primary School	Palauli
	Puleia Primary School	Puleia
	Satupaitea Primary School	Satupa'itea
	Sili Primary School	Sili
	Tafua Primary School	Tafua
Fa'asaleleaga No. 1	Iva Primary School	Iva
	Lalomalava Primary School	Lalomalava
	Safotulafai Primary School	Safotulafai
	Salelavalu Primary School	Salelavalu
	Salelologa Primary School	Salelologa
	Sapapali'i Primary School	Sapapali'i
Fa'asaleleaga No. 2	Asaga Primary School	Asaga
	Faga Primary School	Faga
	Lano Primary School	Lano
	Pu'apu'a Primary School	Pu'apu'a
	Sa'asa'ai Primary School	Sa'asa'ai
	Saipipi Primary School	Saipipi
Itu o Tane No. 1	Laumoli Primary School	
	Patamea Primary School	Patamea
	Saleaula Primary School	Saleaula
	Samalaeʻulu Primary School	Samalaeʻulu
	Tutaga Primary School	Fagamalo
Itu o Tane No. 2	Aopo Primary School	Aopo
	Letui Primary School	Letui
	Paia Primary School	Paia
	Safotu Primary School	Safotu
	Safune Primary School	Safune
	Samauga Primary School	Samauga
	Sasina Primary School	Sasina

== School calendar ==
=== Terms ===
School Terms	Dates	Duration
Term 1	1 February - 15 May	(15 weeks)
Term 2	7 June - 3 September	(13 weeks)
Term 3	20 September - 10 December	(12 weeks)

=== 2010 School holidays ===
- 15 May - 6 June
- 4–19 September
- 11 December - 30 January

== See also ==
- Districts of Samoa
- Samoan language
