= Salega =

Coordinates: 13°38′54.45″S 172°39′39.55″W

Salega is a traditional district on the island of Savai'i in Samoa. It is situated on the south side of the island. The population is 3,461 (2006 Census).

== Electoral constituency (Faipule District) ==
In modern politics, Salega is also an electoral constituency (Faipule district), one of 41 divisions based on traditional districts in the country. Salega electoral constituency falls within the larger political district (Itumalo) of Satupa'itea.

Salega constituency has two seats in Samoa's Parliament.

The constituency comprise 8 villages; Fagafau, Samata-i-Tai, Samata-i-Uta, Fogatuli, Fai'a'ai, Vaipua, Fogasavai'i and Sagone.
