= Health in Samoa =

Expenditure on health in Samoa was 7.2% of GDP in 2014, US$418 per capita.

Life expectancy at birth was estimated at 72 years for men in 2016 and 78 for women.

Prevalence of obesity in the adult population, top countries (2016), Samoa has the sixth highest rate in the world.

The Human Rights Measurement Initiative finds that Samoa is fulfilling 75.5% of what it should be fulfilling for the right to health based on its level of income. When looking at the right to health with respect to children, Samoa achieves 98.7% of what is expected based on its current income. In regards to the right to health amongst the adult population, the country achieves 95.4% of what is expected based on the nation's level of income. Samoa falls into the "very bad" category when evaluating the right to reproductive health because the nation is fulfilling only 32.4% of what the nation is expected to achieve based on the resources (income) it has available.

== Healthcare ==
There is a National Health Service. The main hospital, the Tupua Tamasese Meaole Hospital, is located at Motootua. It has 200 beds. Tertiary care is mainly provided through arrangement with the New Zealand health care system.

The Malietoa Tanumafili II Hospital is at Tuasivi. There are district hospitals in Sataua, Safotu, Foailalo, Leulumoega, Lalomanu and Poutasi.

== Health issues ==
The obesity rate is one of the highest in the world.
