= Asaga, Samoa =

Asaga
- Village
- Location within Samoa
- Coordinates: 13°35′56″S 172°12′17″W
- Country: Samoa
- District: Fa'asaleleaga
- Elevation: 3 m (9.8 ft)

Population (2016)
  - Total: 269
- Time zone: +13
- Climate: Af

Asaga is a village on the north east coast of Savai'i island in Samoa, situated between the villages of Lano to the south and Pu'apu'a to the north. The village is part of the electoral constituency (Faipule District) Fa'asaleleaga 5 which is within the larger political district (Itumalo) of Fa'asaleleaga.

The population is 269.
