= Fusi (disambiguation) =

Fusi is a brand of motorcycles.

Fusi may also refer to:

== Places ==
- Fusi, Samoa, a village
- Alcara li Fusi, a comune in Sicily, Italy
- Fusi Mountain in the People's Republic of China

== Other uses ==
- Fusi (name)
- Fusi (pasta), a type of pasta
- Virgin Mountain (Icelandic: Fúsi), a 2015 Icelandic film

== See also ==
- Fuzi, a fly-whisk used as a symbol in Buddhism and Taoism
