= Salelavalu =

Salelavalu may refer to:

- Salelavalu Tai, village in Samoa
- Salelavalu Uta, village in Samoa
