= Lotofaga =

- Village & Electoral Constituency
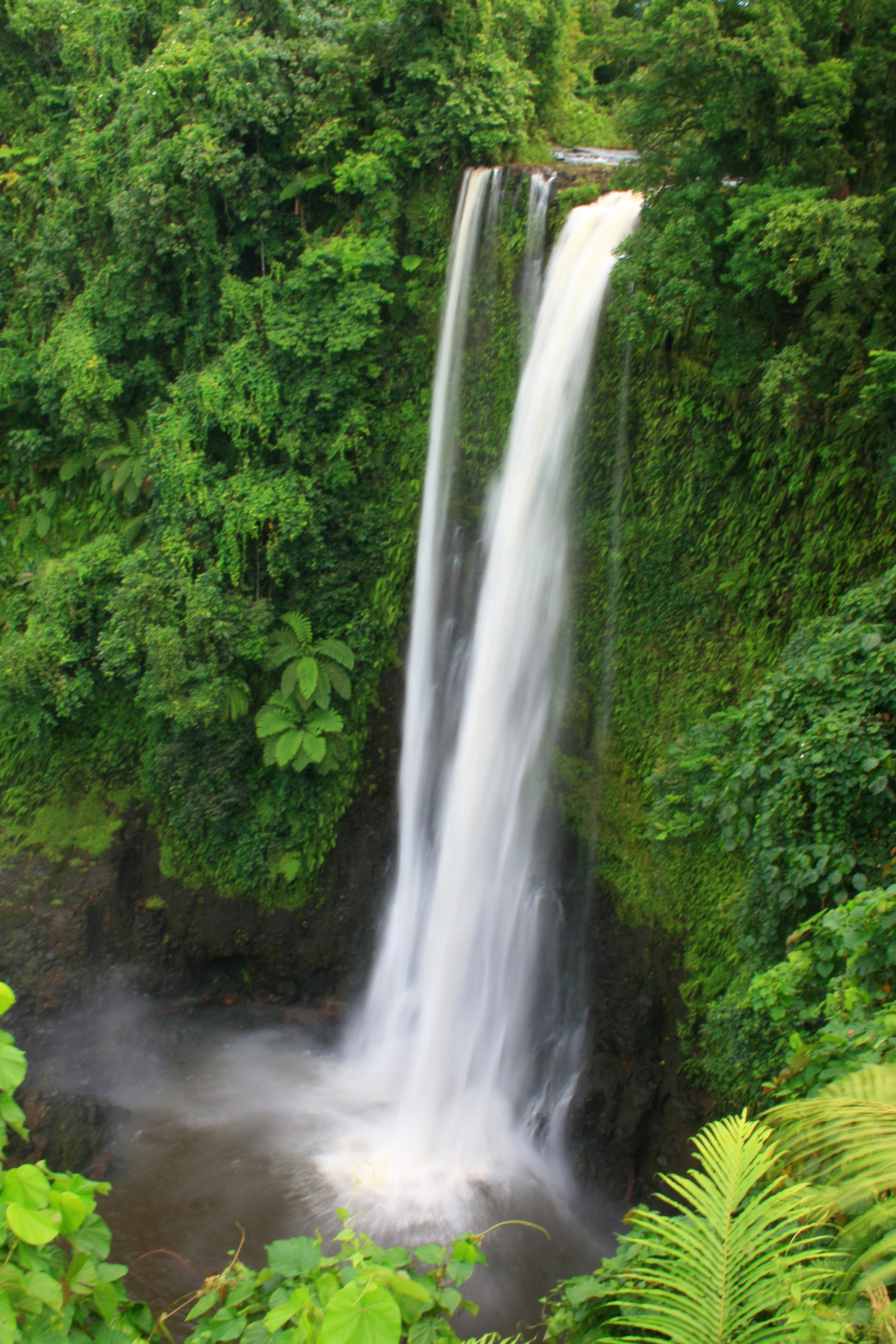
- Fuipisia Falls in Lotofaga

- Location within Samoa
- Coordinates: 14°2′34″S 171°34′11″W
- Country: Samoa
- District: Atua

Population (2016)
  - Total: 971
- Time zone: +13

Lotofaga is a village on the south coast of Upolu island in Samoa. Lotofaga is also the name of the larger Lotofaga Electoral Constituency (Faipule District) which includes Lotofaga village and two other villages, Vavau and Matatufu. The population of Lotofaga village is 971.

== Archaeology ==
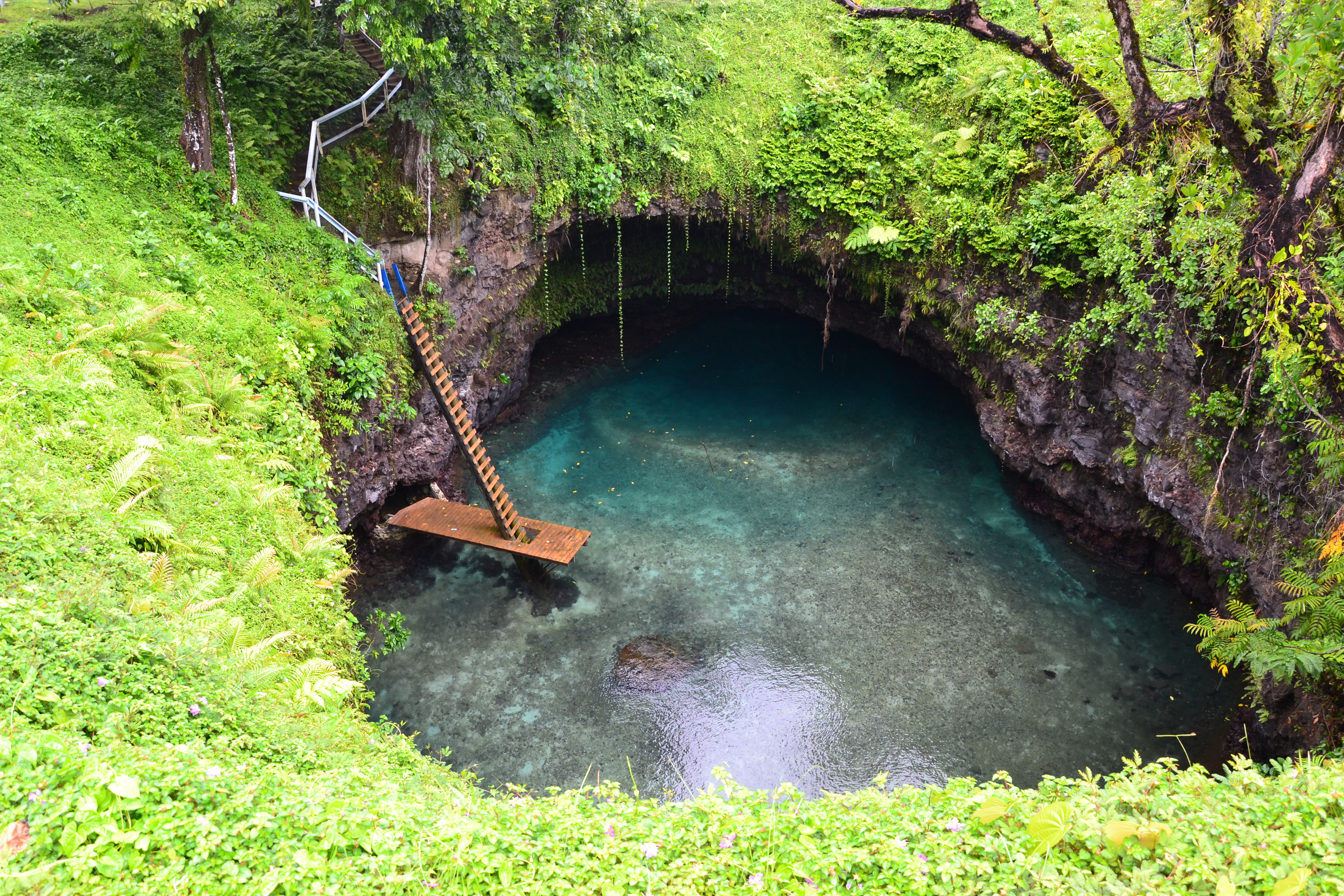
To Sua ocean trench in Lotofaga

During the 1960s, archaeologists investigating the early settlement of the Pacific Islands uncovered a prehistoric settlement inland from Lotofaga in an area marked Tafagamanu Sand. The date obtained from the cultural deposit was 735 plus or minus 85 years BP. Tafagamanu Sand is a geological name given to beach and beach ridge deposits of carbonate sand occurring up to 2 m or more above sea level.

== Politics ==
The population of Lotofaga Electoral Constituency is 1,816. The villages and Lotofaga Electoral Constituency all come within the larger political district of Atua.

The first Prime Minister of Samoa, Fiame Mata'afa Faumuina Mulinu'u II (5 August 1921 – 20 May 1975), a paramount chief, entered politics at the 1957 general election from the Lotofaga Electoral Constituency. The high chief title Fiame is from Lotofaga. His wife was Laulu Fetauimalemau Mata'afa, who was bestowed the chief title of Laulu, also from Lotofaga. At her husband's death in 1975, Laulu Featauimalemau Mata'afa entered politics, winning the Lotofaga seat in the same year and becoming only the second woman in Samoa to become a Member of Parliament.

Their daughter, Fiame Naomi Mata'afa, a high chief with the Fiame chief title once held by her father, has been the Member of Parliament for Lotofaga constituency for many years in the Legislative Assembly of Samoa. She is the first woman in Samoa appointed to Cabinet, the first woman to become Deputy Prime Minister and in April 2021, was elected as the nation’s first female prime minister.
