= Avata =

Village in Savai'i, Samoa

Coordinates: 13°29′36″S 172°46′44″W

Avata is a village on the island of Savai'i in Samoa. It is situated at the northwestern end of the island in the district of Vaisigano and the electoral district of Falealupo. The population is 360.
