= Va o Iva =

Village on the island of Savai'i in Samoa

Coordinates: 13°42′27.11″S 172°12′47.23″W

Va o Iva is a village on the island of Savai'i in Samoa. It is situated on the east coast of the island in the district of Fa'asaleleaga and the electoral district of Fa'asaleleaga 2.
