= Saloga =

Saloga is a village on the island of Savai'i in Samoa. It is situated on the east coast of the island in the district of Fa'asaleleaga and the electoral district of Fa'asaleleaga 1.
