= Neiafu =

Neiafu is the name of several places in Polynesia:

== Tonga ==
- Neiafu (Vava'u) – the second largest town in Tonga, located on Vava'u island.
- Neiafu (Tongatapu) – a small village at the western end of Tongatapu island.

== Samoa ==
- Neiafu (Samoa) – a village on Savai'i island.
