= Corruption in Samoa =

Corruption in Samoa describes the prevention and occurrence of corruption in Samoa. Samoa has made strides in addressing corruption, with ongoing efforts to strengthen transparency and governance. According to the International Monetary Fund, the threat posed by corruption and bribery in the country is considered moderate. In 2021, 50 percent of Samoans viewed corruption as a significant issue—a figure notably lower than the regional average of 61 percent. The country has performed well in improving transparency but challenges remain as demonstrated in recurring problem of misuse of public funds.

== Corruption cases ==
While corruption perception and governance indicators have improved in the past decades, Samoa still grapples with corruption, particularly, in the public sector. This is evident in cases of the misuse of public funds in government agencies responsible for infrastructure and development projects. Samoa’s Office of the Controller and Auditor General uncovered significant discrepancies in budget allocations, revealing instances where funds designated for public services were either misappropriated or redirected. One notable case, the "grass cuttings scandal," exposed a troubling misuse of government contracts. Investigations found that contractors hired for routine roadside maintenance, such as grass cutting, continued receiving payments for months despite failing to fulfill their obligations.

In October 2024, the Samoa Observer reported a specific instance of corruption in the Fa'asaleleaga No. 2 district where $175,000 in public funds allocated for development projects was allegedly misappropriated. The Attorney General's legal opinion to the Ministry of Finance deemed the disappearance of these funds as potential theft, emphasizing the need for police investigation and accountability. The report also noted the lack of transparency surrounding the Ministry of Finance's findings and the fairness of potentially penalizing the entire district council when specific individuals were allegedly responsible.

Freedom House have also identified notable cases of grand corruption such as in 2014, when five high-ranking Education Ministry officials were charged with theft. It also cited a parliamentary inquiry that found dishonesty among revenue ministry staff in tax collection, suggesting potential embezzlement of funds. The report also cited the case involving the finance minister who allegedly used public funds to purchase a high-end vehicle for personal use, leading to his resignation.

The election in 2021 of Fiamē Naomi Mata’afa, who became the country’s first-ever female prime minister, was also marred with allegations of corruption. Running on an anti-corruption platform, Mataʻafa openly criticized the leadership of her former party, which had dominated Samoan politics for over two decades, accusing them of entrenched corrupt practices. She asserted that her predecessor and political opponent, Tuilaepa Sailele Malielegaoi, along with several lawmakers, had attempted to manipulate the nation's judicial system for political gain.

== Corruption control ==
Samoa has acceded to the United Nations Convention Against Corruption (UNCAC) in 2018 and has committed to combating corruption through legal and institutional reform. Specific measures adopted to address the problem include the passage of Crimes Act of 2013, which criminalizes various forms of corruption such as bribery of public officials, judicial officers, ministers, members of the Parliament, and law enforcement officers.

Samoa's legal framework for combating corruption also includes key legislations such as the Extradition Act 1974 (amended 1994). This law enables international cooperation in criminal investigations and the extradition of individuals accused of corruption-related offenses. Furthermore, the Proceeds of Crime Act 2007 (previously mentioned as "Crime Act 2007" which typically refers to a broader criminal code) specifically criminalizes money laundering activities, often associated with corrupt practices. Complementing these laws is the Mutual Assistance in Criminal Matters Act 2007, which establishes the procedures and frameworks for providing and receiving mutual legal assistance in criminal matters, including the sharing of evidence and facilitating extradition requests.

Samoa also introduced its National Anti-Corruption Policy and Strategy 2023-2028. Launched in June 2024, it seeks to establish an anti-corruption culture across the nation, encompassing the public sector, private sector, and civil society organizations. The strategy systematically addresses and mitigates the risks and impact of corruption by strengthening anti-corruption mechanisms, enhancing prevention and response, and the promotion of transparency.

The institutional mechanisms that help Samoa investigate and prosecute corrupt practices include the Public Service Commission, which coordinates anti-corruption efforts. This agency also drafted the National Anti-Corruption Policy. There is also the Samoa Audit Office, which audits public sector finances and reports irregularities to the Parliament. As part of its UNCAC commitment, Samoa is also in the process of establishing an Integrity Commission to support its anti-corruption efforts.

The anti-corruption measures have allowed Samoa to make some strides in its performance. In 2021, the incidence of reported bribery among voters is 11 percent while those involving public services was at 17 percent. These figures are around half of the regional averages (26 and 32, respectively). Authorities also reported that Samoa is less vulnerable to corruption from foreign forces since it is less likely to be used as a transit hub since it has less attractive shipping and logistics infrastructure. The 2022 Worldwide Governance Indicators reported that Samoa has greater control over corruption in comparison with its Pacific neighbors except American Samoa and Tuvalu.
