= Falefia =

Samoan village

Coordinates: 13°43′50.57″S 172°12′42.48″W

Falefia is a village at the east end of Savai'i island in Samoa. The village is part of the electoral constituency (Faipule District) Fa'asaleleaga I which is within the larger political district (Itumalo) of Fa'asaleleaga.

The population is 415 (2006 Census).
