= Vaimaga =

Village on the island of Savai'i in Samoa

Coordinates: 13°39′35″S 172°25′55″W

Vaimaga is a village on the east coast of Savai'i island in Samoa. The village is part of the electoral constituency (Faipule District) Fa'asaleleaga 3 which is within the larger political district (Itumalo) of Fa'asaleleaga.

The population is 382.
