= Sapini =

Samoan village

Coordinates: 13°39′05″S 172°11′18″W

Sapini is a village on the island of Savai'i in Samoa. It is situated on the east coast of the island in the district of Fa'asaleleaga and the electoral district of Fa'asaleleaga 4.
