= Utuloa =

Village in Vaisigano, Savai'i, Samoa

Coordinates: 13°30′29″S 172°38′07″W

Utuloa is a village on the island of Savai'i in Samoa. It is situated at the northwestern end of the island in the district of Vaisigano and the electoral district of Vaisigano 1. The population is 20.
