= Sapulu =

Coordinates: 13°43′38.53″S 172°12′23.05″W

Sapulu is a village at the east side of Savai'i island in Samoa. The village is part of the electoral constituency (Faipule District) Fa'asaleleaga 1 which is within the larger political district (Itumalo) of Fa'asaleleaga.

The population is 1,221.
