= Lataitai =

Village in Samoa

Coordinates: 13.75256°S 172.58124°W

Lataitai is a village on the island of Savai'i in Samoa. It is situated on the south coast of the island in Palauli district.
