= Foailuga =

Village in Samoa

Coordinates: 13°40′S 172°33′W

Foailuga is a village on the island of Savai'i in Samoa. It is situated on the south coast of the island in the district of Palauli and the electoral district of Palauli 1. The population is 576. Spanning a 9.466 km² Area with beautiful hidden beaches and local fresh water holes.

Foailuga is near the other villages of Foailalo and Satuiatua.

Many of the villagers have emigrated overseas, mainly to the United States and New Zealand. Like the rest of Samoa, Foailuga is governed at a local level by chiefs (matai) with support from the women's committee in the village. Life remains relatively traditional with subsistence living from food and crops grown in plantations as well as fishing.

The people of Foailuga are mainly Methodist and Mormon. Sports include volleyball, basketball, and kilikiti, Samoan cricket. There is only two local family owned stalls/shops that service the basic needs of the village.
