= Luua (Samoa) =

Village on the island of Savai'i in Samoa

Coordinates: 13°38′58.93″S 172°11′19.87″W

Luua is a pitonu'u (sub-village) on the island of Savai'i as part of the village Faga in Samoa. It is situated on the east coast of the island in the district of Fa'asaleleaga and the electoral district of Fa'asaleleaga 4. The population is 300.
