= Utualiʻi =

Village in Samoa

- Village District
- Location within Samoa
- Coordinates: 13°48′3.27″S 171°54′33.10″W
- Country: Samoa
- Island: Upolu
- District: Tuamasaga

Population (June 2021)
  - Total: 540
- Time zone: +13

Utualiʻi is a small village along the central north-western coast of ʻUpolu Island, Sāmoa, within the political district of Tuamāsaga. The village is surrounded by Tufulele and Faleasiʻū to the west, and Malua and Saleʻimoa to the east. The village has one supermarket (Frankie Supermarket), nine local shops and a Vailima beer outlet.

== History ==
Utualiʻi was one of multiple villages to be hit along the north coast of ʻUpolu Island during the 1841 Bombardment of ʻUpolu. In 1899, during the Second Sāmoan Civil War, Utualiʻi was once again hit by American and British warships along with many other villages on ʻUpolu Island, burning land, crops and village residences.

In 1965–1967, Utualiʻi was one of four villages (the other three being Poutasi, Uafato and Taga) selected to be studied and investigated by Brian Lockwood examining the shift from subsistence farming to a market-orientated economy in the newly independent country of Western Sāmoa (as it was then known).

In 2024, the Commonwealth Heads of Government Meeting (CHOGM) was held in Apia, Sāmoa. Utualiʻi participated in representing the country of Canada.
