= Electoral constituencies of Samoa =

Voting districts for election to the Samoan parliament

The Fono Aoao Faitulafono (Legislative Assembly) of Samoa has 51 members representing 51 electoral constituencies. Until 1991 voting for candidates in traditional territorial constituencies was by matai (chiefs) suffrage only. After a 1990 plebiscite, universal suffrage was introduced with a voting age of 21.

Only registered matais may stand in territorial electorates.

== Previously ==
Up until the 2021 Election, there were 49 members. Of these, 47 were elected from 41 territorial constituencies based on traditional districts. Two members were elected on a non-territorial basis by voters on the Individual Voters Roll. Voters and candidates could move from the territorial constituencies rolls to the Individual Voters Roll. The eligibility of candidates and voters for the two types of constituencies was different.

Changes were implemented in 2019 with an amendment to the Samoan Constitution, and the Electoral Constituencies Act.

== Territorial constituencies ==
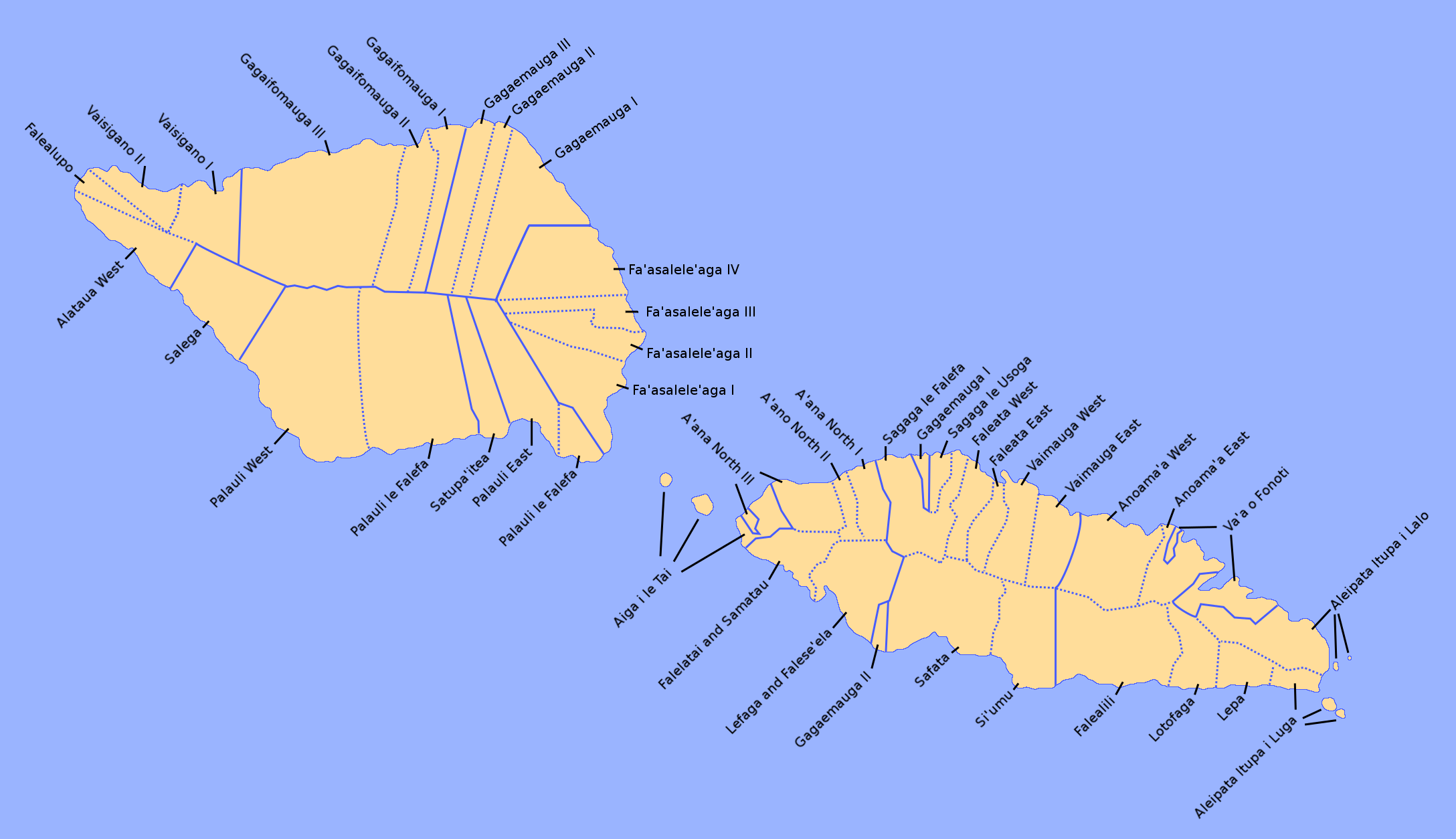

The constituencies each belong to an itūmālō (political district) and are given an official number:

No.	Constituency name	Itūmālō
1	Vaimauga No. 1	Tuamasaga
2	Vaimauga No. 2	Tuamasaga
3	Vaimauga No. 3	Tuamasaga
4	Vaimauga No. 4	Tuamasaga
5	Faleata No. 1	Tuamasaga
6	Faleata No. 2	Tuamasaga
7	Faleata No. 3	Tuamasaga
8	Faleata No. 4	Tuamasaga
9	Sagaga No. 1	Tuamasaga
10	Sagaga No. 2	Tuamasaga
11	Sagaga No. 3	Tuamasaga
12	Sagaga No. 4	Tuamasaga
13	A'ana Alofi No. 1	A'ana
14	A'ana Alofi No. 2	A'ana
15	A'ana Alofi No. 3	A'ana
16	A'ana Alofi No. 4	A'ana
17	Aiga-i-le-Tai	Aiga-i-le-Tai
18	Falelatai & Samatau	A'ana
19	Lefaga and Falese'ela	A'ana
20	Safata 1	Tuamasaga
21	Safata No. 2	Tuamasaga
22	Si'umu	Tuamasaga
23	Falealili No. 1	Atua
24	Falealili No. 2	Atua
25	Lotofaga	Atua
26	Lepa	Atua
27	Aleipata Itupa-i-luga	Atua
28	Aleipata Itupa-i-lalo	Atua
29	Va'a-o-Fonoti	Va'a-o-Fonoti
30	Anoama'a No. 1	Atua
31	Anoama'a No. 2	Atua
32	Fa'asalele'aga No. 1	Fa'asalele'aga
33	Fa'asalele'aga No. 2	Fa'asalele'aga
34	Fa'asalele'aga No. 3	Fa'asalele'aga
35	Fa'asalele'aga No. 4	Fa'asalele'aga
36	Fa'asalele'aga No. 5	Fa'asalele'aga
37	Gagaemauga No. 1	Gagaemauga
38	Gagaemauga No. 2	Gagaemauga
39	Gagaifomauga No. 1	Gagaifomauga
40	Gagaifomauga No. 2	Gagaifomauga
41	Gagaifomauga No. 3	Gagaifomauga
42	Vaisigano No. 1	Vaisigano
43	Vaisigano No. 2	Vaisigano
44	Falealupo	Vaisigano
45	Alataua Sisifo	Vaisigano
46	Salega No. 1	Satupa'itea
47	Salega No. 2	Satupa'itea
48	Palauli No. 1	Palauli
49	Palauli No. 2	Palauli
50	Satupa'itea	Satupa'itea
51	Palauli No. 3	Palauli
