= Alofaaga Blowholes =

Group of blowholes in Samoa

Coordinates: 13.8022°S 172.5197°W

The Alofaaga Blowholes, also known as the Taga Blowholes, are a natural feature located in the district of Palauli, south west of Salelologa wharf on the island of Savai'i in Samoa. The entrance to the blowholes is in the village of Taga.

In this area, lava flows have created a series of tubes connecting a flat clifftop of lava rock with the ocean below. Waves breaking against the lower end of the lava tubes send water at high pressure up through the tubes, creating fountains that spray every few seconds. As most of the land in Samoa is under customary ownership, the village charges a small admission for entry to view the blowholes. The area is unfenced and surrounded by wet, slippery rocks which can be dangerous. Falling into one of the blowholes would be almost certainly fatal. A track along the coast can be followed west to the ancient village of Fagaloa.

== Gallery ==
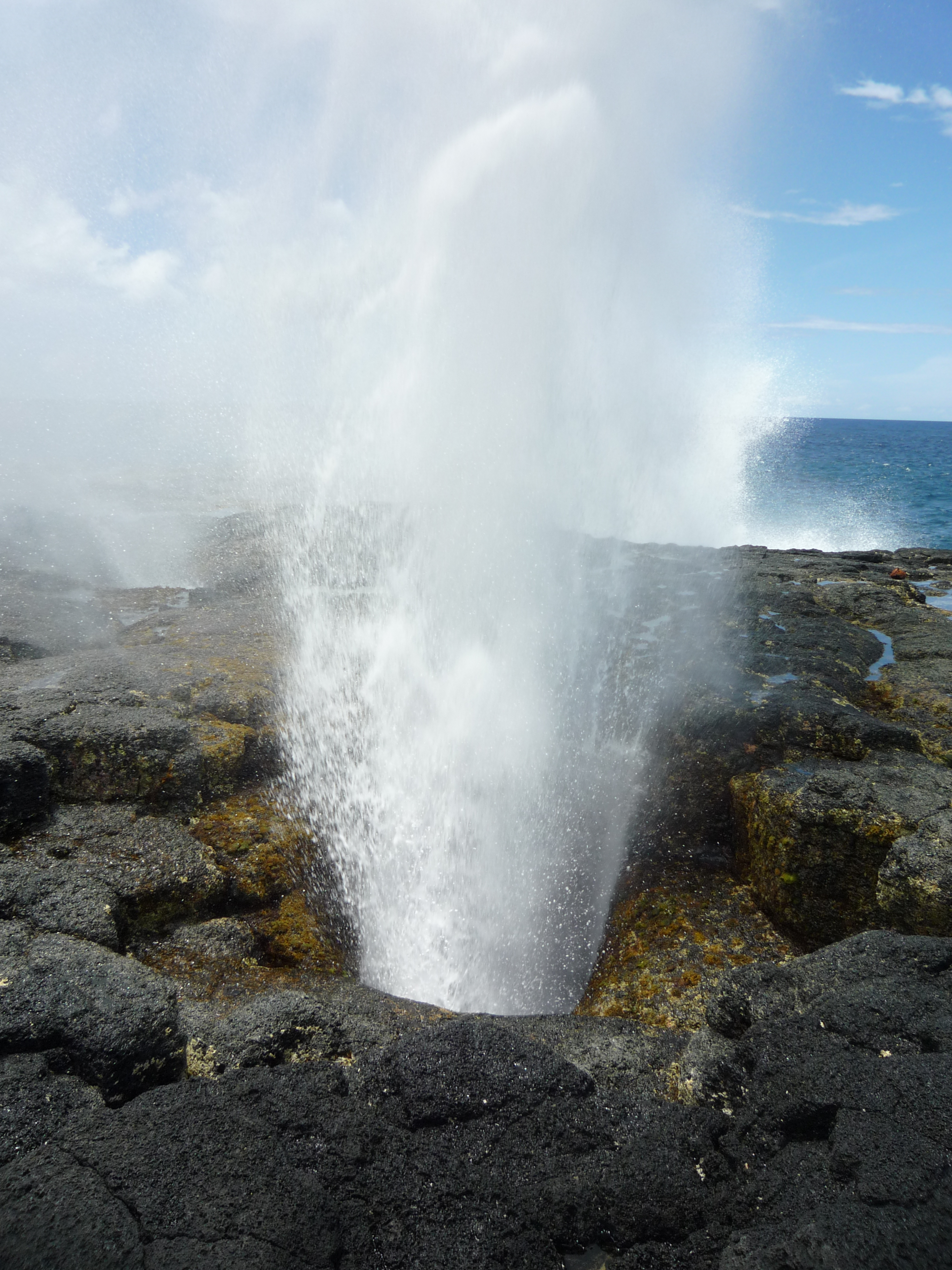

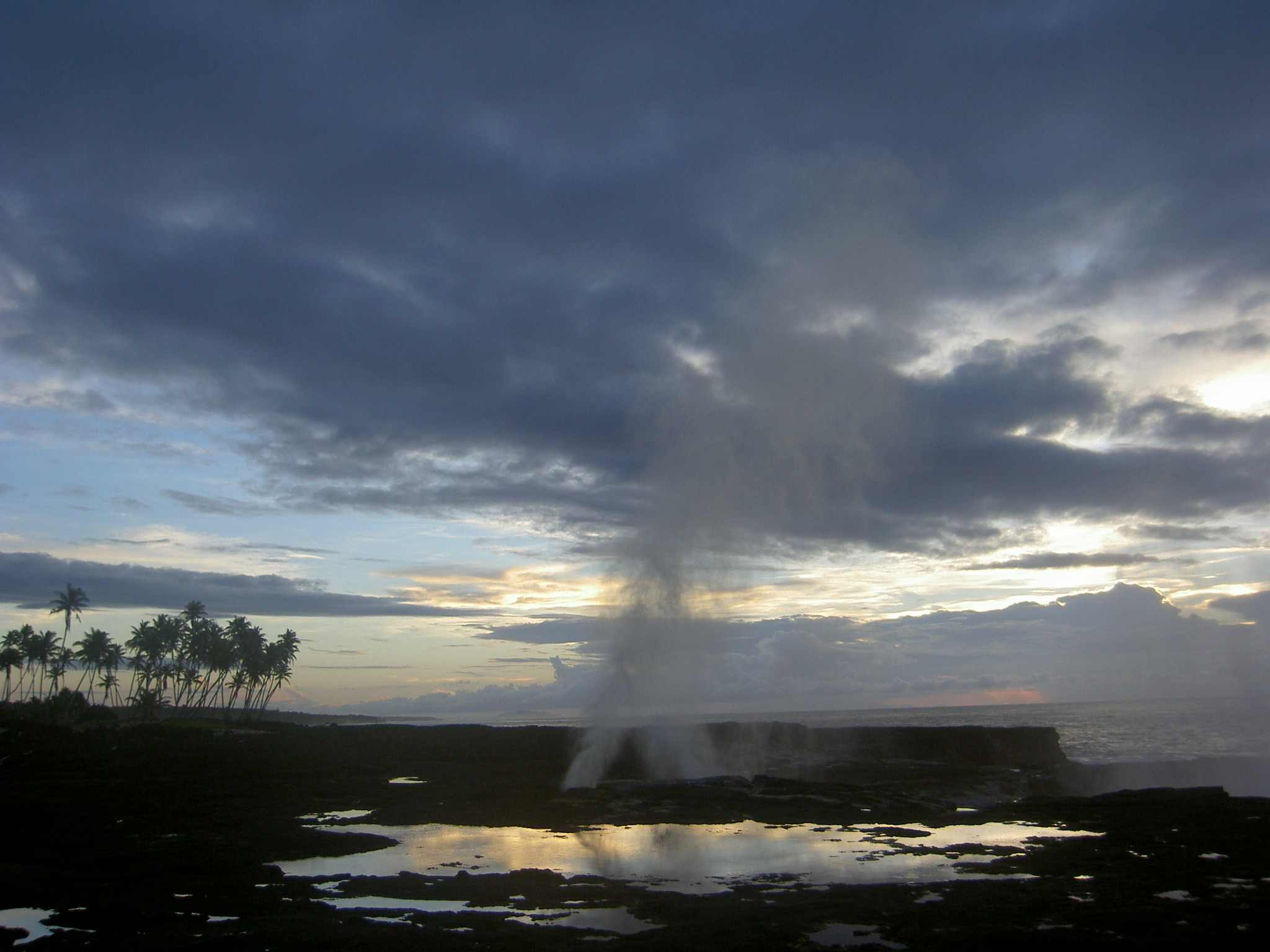

== See also ==
- Piula Cave Pool
- Mata o le Alelo Pool
- Falemauga Caves
