= Vaiee =

Coordinates: 14°00′S 171°49′W

Vaiee is a small village on the Samoan island of Upolu. It is located on the central south coast of the island. The village has a population of 565.

The village is situated in the Safata subdistrict of the larger Tuamasaga district. To the West it is bordered by Niusuatia, and to the East by Fusi Safata. The village of Vaiee is known for many activities and sports such as Samoan Cricket and Rugby. The village is predominantly Christian and has only one established and recognized denomination, being the Ekalesia Faapotopotoga Kerisiano o Samoa (CCCS). The church was founded in 1843 by the LMS Missionary Rev. George Turner and the people of Vaiee Safata, the same Rev. Turner who went on to establish and run the Malua Theological College. The village has a tapu or taboo on other denominations besides the EFKS/CCCS being formally established within the village. However, a handful of the village belong to other denominations outside the village such as Catholicism, Mormonism, Evangelical Christian Churches and others.

The village was once situated on a narrow peninsula separated from the mainland by a narrow stretch of water, part of the peninsula belonged to the village while other parts were under the administration of neighbouring villages such as Tafitoala and Fusi Safata. The village or the aai was moved twice to the mainland, it first moved to the mainland in the late 19th century but moved back to the peninsular following strict German laws on settlement structures and cleanliness. In 1955 the village council then again decided to move the village back to the mainland where it is now to allow for better access to transport infrastructure and water supplies.

The Geography of the area is mostly volcanic in composition and is characterized by rolling hills which further define smaller divisions within the village, such as: Fualalo (below the hill), Ogatotonu (middle) and Fualuga (Above the hill). A large peninsular stretches from the village of Tafitoala to the East forming an indentation of water which is only linked to the sea through a narrow opening situated in Vaiee's coastal reaches. This forms a large natural bay and natural protection from ocean surges during cyclones and extensive effects of tsunamis. The Bay allows for a complex Mangrove and Coastal Marine ecosystem to flourish which in recent times has seen a decline due to over-fishing, village neglect and unsustainable fishing practices. However through conservation legislation passed by the Government of Samoa, large tracks of mangroves and marine life are now protected.

The village also owns large tracts of lands inland, where some of the villagers have cultivated but most of which have been left abandoned due to difficulties in the terrain. Vaiee has a large diaspora centered around New Zealand and Australia as most villages in Samoa have, they have contributed greatly to the development of the village both economically and socially.

Notable Faʻamatai titles of Vaiee include the Warrior title of Te'o or sometimes referred to as the 'Anava-o-taua' which literally translates to 'instituter of war', Tuia and Maugatai or also referred to as the 'Matua' which translates to the 'eldest' or the 'first settler'. Other notable matai titles include the orator titles of Lutuimagamau, Lealaimuna, Availepule and Faiavalesua as well as usoalii and other orator titles such as Tula'i, Fuialii, Matauiau, Sagala, Ipiipi etc.
