= Matatufu =

Coordinates: 14°03′S 171°35′W

Matatufu is a small village on south east end of Upolu island in Samoa. The village is part of Lotofaga Electoral Constituency (Faipule District) which is within the larger political district of Atua.

The population is 465.

Neighbouring villages are Lotofaga and Vavau.
