= Fogatuli =

- Location within Samoa
- Coordinates: 13°37′S 172°37′W
- Country: Samoa
- District: Satupa'itea
- Electoral constituency: Salega
- Elevation: 46 m (151 ft)

Population (2016)
  - Total: 251
- Time zone: UTC+13 (UTC+13:00)
  - Summer (DST): UTC+14 (UTC+14:00)

Fogatuli is a village on the island of Savai'i in Samoa. It is situated on the south coast of the island in the district of Satupa'itea and the electoral district of Salega 1. The population is 251.
