= Auala =

- Village
- Location within Samoa
- Coordinates: 13°30′54″S 172°39′10″W
- Country: Samoa
- District: Vaisigano

Population (2016)
  - Total: 507
- Time zone: -11
- Climate: Am
- Auala includes a Turtle habitat conservation area

Auala is a small village on the northwest coast of Savai'i island in Samoa. The village is in the electoral constituency of Vaisigano East which forms part of the larger political district of Vaisigano. The village's population was 507 in 2016, a decrease from 573 in 2011.

The village has a semi-subsistence economy and the people rely mainly on fishing, farming and remittances from family members working overseas or in Apia, the country's capital on the island of Upolu.

Like most villages in Samoa, the people live in extended family groups with all land and natural resources belonging to the village as a whole under the government of the Village Council of Chiefs (fono). All the families are represented in the fono as well as the Women's Committee.

There are extended families made up of five families with tulafale oratory chiefly status and two of High Chief status. Auala's high chief titles are Leali'ifanolevalevale and Tapu (matai ali'i). Leali'ifanolevalevale and Tapu titles have been passed down by many generations. The (Toalima ) five family chiefly titles that are of 2 sub families.) 1)Ta'avaomaletagaloa, 2)Moe, 3)Paiali'i are called Sa Tapu. 4)Sululoto, 5)Matamea are called Le Ati Manutai.

Auala is also known as Safune Taufa'asala the four families of Tagaloa Safune. (Fale Fa Gafua o Safune).

Auala has one malae (open area serving as the village main ceremonial commons), Falefa'aea.

The main Taupou name (Sa'oTama'ita'i) in Auala is Filiamata which is the name given to the daughter of the high chief and they perform the Samoa 'ava ceremony and Taualuga. The main Aumaga name (Sa'oAumaga) is Leota.

There are two churches in the village which has a fairly small coastal frontage fringed by a reef.

The neighbouring villages are Vaisala and Asau.

== Marine Park ==
Auala bay is a conservation area with a turtle habitat which is being managed by the Auala Women's Committee.

== Communications ==
The committee also run a feso'ota'i centre (telecentre/ICT centre). This makes ICT available for people to keep in touch and up-to-date with the latest technologies in the world. Fair prices and a variety of services including, internet, passport photos, family and group photos, colour printing, copying, scanning, phone, fax, webcam, projector hire and CD burning give people access to a variety of services they previously would have had to travel to the capital for.
