= Vailoa =

- Village
- Location within Samoa
- Coordinates: 13°45′21″S 172°18′23″W
- Country: Samoa
- District: Palauli

Population (2016)
  - Total: 784
- Time zone: -11

Vailoa (Vailoa i Palauli) is a village on the island of Savaiʻi in Samoa. Vailoa is the capital of Palauli district on the south east of the island. The population is 784.

Vailoa attained the status of Pule (traditional political authority) sometime in the 19th century. The village is associated with the chiefly title of Lilomaiava. It is referred to as Vailoa i Palauli (Vailoa in Palau district).

Like most villages in Samoa, the local economy is based on subsistence living. The people live off their land from crops grown in plantations behind the village or fishing.

== Customary land claim ==
In recent years, village chiefs have been involved in a legal claim for customary land lost during the German era of Samoan colonialism. The dispute dates back to 1886 when customary land was sold to the family of Olaf Frederick Nelson. The village claims that the land is custom held and was never lawfully alienated and couldn't therefore become freehold. In 2008, the Samoa Court of Appeal turned down the claim for the second time.

The disputed land includes an area known in modern times as the Nelson Plantation where extensive prehistoric settlement remains and monuments have been surveyed and studied, including Pulemelei Mound.

== Notable people ==
- Uale Mai, from Vailoa village, is a rugby union player and a former captain of the Samoa Sevens team and one of the great players in the international sport. He is the only Samoan to be awarded the IRB International Sevens Player of the Year which he received for the 2005–06 World Sevens Series.
