= Nofoali'i =

Village of Samoa

- Village
- Location within Samoa
- Coordinates: 13°49′S 171°58′W
- Country: Samoa
- District: A'ana

Population (2016)
  - Total: 2,018

Nofoali'i is a village on the Samoan island of Upolu. It is located on the northwestern coast of the island between Fasito'o Uta and Leulumoega. It is the sixth village from Faleolo International Airport. The village is part of A'ano Alofi 3 Electoral Constituency (Faipule District), which forms part of the larger A'ana political district.

The population of Nofoali'i is 2,018. Until 31 January 2019, the pulenu’u of Nofoali'i was Otemai Liu Ausage; however, he was terminated by the Samoan government for speaking out against it.

In 2018, Tuiatua Tupua Tamasese Efi, former Prime Minister, was banished from the village.
