= Samatau =

Village in Upolu, Samoa

Coordinates: 13°54′S 172°02′W

Samatau is a village on the island of Upolu in Samoa. It is situated on the west side of the island in the political district of A'ana.

The population is 979.
