= Pu'apu'a =

Village in savai'i Island in samoa

Coordinates: 13°35′S 172°13′W

Pu'apu'a is a village on the north east coast of Savai'i island in Samoa. The village is part of the electoral constituency (Faipule District) Fa'asaleleaga 5 which is within the larger political district (Itumalo) of Fa'asaleleaga. The population is 510.
