= Lepā, Samoa =

Lepā
- Village & Electoral Constituency
- Location within Samoa
- Coordinates: 14°2′43″S 171°26′27″W
- Country: Samoa
- District: Atua

Population (2016)
  - Total: 166
- Time zone: +13

Lepā is a small village at the southeastern end of Upolu island in Samoa. The village has a population of 166.

It is also the name of an electoral faipule district, Lepā Electoral Constituency, which consists of six villages, including Lepā village, with a total population of 1538. Lepā should not be confused with the village of Lepea, situated near Apia.

The village and Lepā Electoral Constituency are part of the larger political district of Atua.

== Lepa Electoral Constituency ==
The six villages within Lepā Electoral Constituency includes the settlements of A'ufaga, Lealatele and Saleapaga.

Lepā is the birthplace of former Samoan Prime Minister Tuila'epa Sa'ilele Malielegaoi.

The Lepā area was extensively damaged in the 2009 Samoa earthquake and tsunami. Most of Lepā village was destroyed, leaving just the church and the village's welcome sign standing.
