= Ulutogia =

- Village
- Location within Samoa
- Coordinates: 14°2′43″S 171°26′27″W
- Country: Samoa
- District: Atua

Population (2016)
  - Total: 202
- Time zone: -11

Ulutogia is a village on the east coast of Upolu island in Samoa. The village is part of the electoral constituency (Faipule District) Aleipata Itupa i Luga which is part of the political district of Atua. It has a population of 202.

Ulutogia is approximately 1 hour and 20 minutes' drive from Apia, the country's capital.

The High Chief (Ali'i Taua) title name of the village is Sagapolutele.

Ulutogia is also home to a famous saying (Alagaupu), "Ua togi pa tau i le 'ave." (The breadfruit was hit on the stalk)

== 2009 Samoa tsunami ==
Ulutogia was heavily damaged in the 2009 Samoa tsunami with fatalities following an earthquake south of the Samoa Islands on 29 September 2009. However, the village has slowly recovered in a rebuilding programme with international aid and support.
