= A'ufaga =

Coordinates: 14.041°S 171.522°W

A'ufaga is a small village on the southeast end of Upolu island in Samoa. The village is part of the electoral constituency (Faipule District) Lepa which is included in the larger political district of Atua.

The population is 468.
