= Siuniu =

Village on the Samoan island of Upolu

Coordinates: 14°00′S 171°33′W

Siuniu is a small village on the Samoan island of Upolu. It is located inland from the southeast coast of the island.
