= Fagafau =

Village on the island of Savai'i in Samoa

Coordinates: 13°35′S 172°39′W

Fagafau is a village on the island of Savai'i in Samoa. It is situated on the south coast of the island in the district of Satupa'itea and the electoral district of Salega 1. The population is 240.
