= Afiamalu =

Settlement in Samoa

Coordinates: 13°55′S 171°47′W

Afiamalu is a place on Upolu Island, Samoa. The village, which is part of the greater Apia area, had a population of 183 in 2016.
