= Vaisala, Samoa =

Vaisala
- Village
- Location within Samoa
- Coordinates: 13°30′33″S 172°40′0″W
- Country: Samoa
- District: Vaisigano

Population (2016)
  - Total: 465
- Time zone: -11

Vaisala is a small village on the northwest coast of Savai'i island in Samoa. The village lies within the political district of Vaisigano. The village's population is 465.

It is located close to the coast in the northwestern corner of the island. To the west are the neighbouring villages of Auala and Asau.

A significant family from Vaisala is the Va'ai family. Va'ai Kolone, a matai, was a Member of Parliament of the Vaisala area who became a Prime Minister of Samoa twice in the 1980s. A progressive leader, he was also the founder the Human Rights Protection Party which has since been the dominant party in Samoan politics and currently in power. Va'ai Kolone's father, a government clerk in the German administration of Samoa during colonialism, foresaw the importance of education and sent his own sons to boarding schools in the capital Apia.

The Vaisala Hotel situated at a white sandy beach is one of the largest hotels at the west end of Savai'i.

In 2009, the village council of chiefs banished their Member of Parliament for the Vaisigano No. 1 district, Va’ai Solia Papu Va’ai, over a domestic dispute. He was allowed to return a few months later following a presentation of gifts and reconciliation with the chiefs. In 2007, the same Member of Parliament had survived being shot by a gunman while attending a meeting in the village of Falealupo.
