= Fuailoloo =

Village on the island of Upolu in Samoa

Coordinates: 13°50′41.35″S 172°2′45.07″W

Fuailoloo is a village on the island of Upolu in Samoa. It is situated at the north west coast of the island in the political district of Aiga-i-le-Tai.

The population is 1209.
