= Tufutafoe =

Coordinates: 13°29′S 172°46′W

Tufutafoe is a village on the island of Savai'i in Samoa. It is situated on the west coast of the island in Vaisigano district. The village population is 434.
