= Apolima Uta =

Coordinates: 13.864°S 172.068°W

Apolima Uta is a village on the island of Upolu in Samoa. It is situated on the north-west coast of the island in the political district of Aiga-i-le-Tai.

The population is 500.
