= Fusi (name) =

Fusi may refer to the following people:

Given name

- Fusi Mazibuko (born 1980), South African basketball player

Surname

- Furio Fusi (born 1947), Italian sprinter
- Juan Pablo Fusi (born 1945), Spanish historian
- Luca Fusi (born 1963), Italian football player
- Marco Fusi (clarinet player) (born 1972), Italian clarinetist and composer
- Marco Fusi (violinist, violist), Italian violinist, violist and viola d’amore player.
- Odo Fusi Pecci (1920–2016), Italian prelate of the Roman Catholic Church
