= Matafaa =

Village on Upolu, Samoa

Coordinates: 13°56′32.65″S 171°58′43.63″W

Matafa’a, formerly known as Matafa’a-Falease’elā is a village on the island of Upolu in Samoa. The village is on the south coast of the island and is part of the Lefaga ma Falease’elā Electoral Constituency (Faipule District) which forms part of the larger A'ana political district.

It has a population of 226 people where there is one pre-school and older students have to travel by canoe or car to go to school in other areas. There is no health clinic nor any telephone lines. Recently, the Government of Samoa built a tar-sealed road to the village, a milestone for this isolated village.
