= Saipipi =

- Village
- Location in Samoa
- Coordinates: 13°37′S 172°08′W
- Country: Samoa
- Island: Savai'i
- Political district (Itumalo): Fa'asaleleaga
- Electoral constituency (Faipule District): Fa'asaleleaga 4

Population (2016)
  - Total: 689

Saipipi is a village on the east coast of Savai'i island in Samoa. The village is part of the electoral constituency (Faipule District) Fa'asaleleaga 4 which is within the larger political district (Itumalo) of Fa'asaleleaga.

The population is 689.
