= Faleapuna =

Coordinates: 13°53′S 171°36′W

Faleapuna is a village on the island of Upolu in Samoa.

== Geography ==
It is situated on the north east coast of the island in the political district of Va'a-o-Fonoti. The village is an exclave of Va'a-o-Fonoti and is geographically located further west within the district of Atua, and forms part of the Anoamaa 1 Electoral Constituency (Faipule District) which forms part of the larger A'ana political district.

As of 2021, the population was 600.

== Fa'alupega ==
The fa'alupega of Faleapuna is:

- Tulouna oe le Va'a o Fonoti o le malu o Maauga ma Lalogafu'afu'a
  - (Honors to the fleet of King Fonoti, the refuge of Maauga and Lalogafu'afu'a)
- Tulouna lau fetalaiga a Molioo, o le too o le Fua ma lo outou aiga o Sa Molioo
  - (Honors to the word of Molio'o, the oar that steers the fleet, the Molio'o clan)
- Afifio mai oulua Gafa o Tauaa ma Fonoti
  - (Welcome, Taua'aletoa and Fonoti clans)
- Tulouna le suafa o Taito ma Maeataanoa
  - (Honors to the name of Taito and Maeataanoa)
- Tulouna le alo o Sina o Tialavea
  - (Honors to the son of Sina, Tialavea)
- Tulouna oe le Ailaoa
  - (Honors to the Ailaoa)
- Tulouna lou fofoga o Malepeai o le aitu o le nuu
  - (Honors to the voice of Malepeai, the spirit of the village)

== Important names in Faleapuna ==
=== Igoa-Ipu ===
The chiefs and their Kava Cup Names are:

- Tauaaletoa - Faimalō
- Fonoti - Faleupolu usu mai
- Tialavea - Malo Taoto

=== Maota ===
The Maota of the chiefs are:

- Tauaaletoa - Papataia
- Fonoti - Vainiu
- Tialavea - Leafe
- Maeataanoa - Mulivai

=== Laoa ===
The Laoa of the Tulafale Ali'i (Orator Chief) Molio'o, is called Falepoulima or Safaletauā.

The Laoa of the Molio'o is called "Falepoulima" when the family and village of Faleapuna are all together. However, when Lufilufi and Leulumoega (the Tumua) arrive, it is called "Safaletauā". Molio'o is known as Le too'too poo le Taitai au o le Fuāvaatau a Atua (the Oar, or the commander of the fleet of Atua) or Le To'o o le Fua (the Oar that steers the fleet) for short. This comes from his appointment by King Fonoti, the Tupu Tafaifa.

=== Sa'otamaita'i ===
The Sa'otamaita'i (Supreme Ladiea) are:

- Tauaaletoa - 'Ilia
- Fonoti - Tuitagavaa
- Tialavea - Tuloutele
- Maeataanoa - Mana
- Molioo - Taga'iofoloa

=== Malae-Fono ===
The Malae-Fono (Village Green) is called Aleipatelēlemele.

=== Savali ===
The Savali (Messenger) is Fa'asii.

=== The Aitu Tau ===
The patron spirit of Faleapuna is Fagamea. The 'ausa'alo is his manifestation. If the fleet is preparing for war, then that section of the fleet will meet over the 'ava i Fiti (sacred kava), then the anchors of the spirit of Fagamea will stand down, and the 'ausa'alo is placed at the bow of the boat. They will then question it and, if the anchor declares that "Fagamea said so and so", they will act, but if he does not speak, it is treated like a piece of wood.
