= Saleapaga =

Coordinates: 14°02′S 171°30′W

Saleapaga is a village on the south east coast of Upolu island in Samoa. The village is part of Lepa Electoral Constituency (Faipule District) which is within the larger political district of Atua.

The population is 617.
