= Tuasivi =

- Village
- Location within Samoa
- Coordinates: 13°40′.77″S 172°10′38.6″W
- Country: Samoa
- District: Fa'asaleleaga

Population (2016)
  - Total: 193
- Time zone: -11

Tuasivi is a village on the north east coast of Savai'i island in Samoa. The village is in the electoral district of Fa'asaleleaga and has a population of 193.

Tuasivi is the main centre for government administration on Savai'i. There is a small government complex with offices in the village including a judicial court house and the main police station on the island.

Tuasivi Hospital (formally Malietoa Tanumafili II Hospital) is also the main public hospital on the island with about 20 beds and several doctors. It is situated on the coast side of the main road.

Tuasivi has a post office and is 10 minutes north of Salelologa township and ferry terminal. There is also a college and churches of Christian denominations.
