= Tafitoala =

Coordinates: 14°01′S 171°48′W

Tafitoala is a small village on the Samoan island of Upolu. It is located on the central south coast of the island.
