= Lalomanu =

- Village
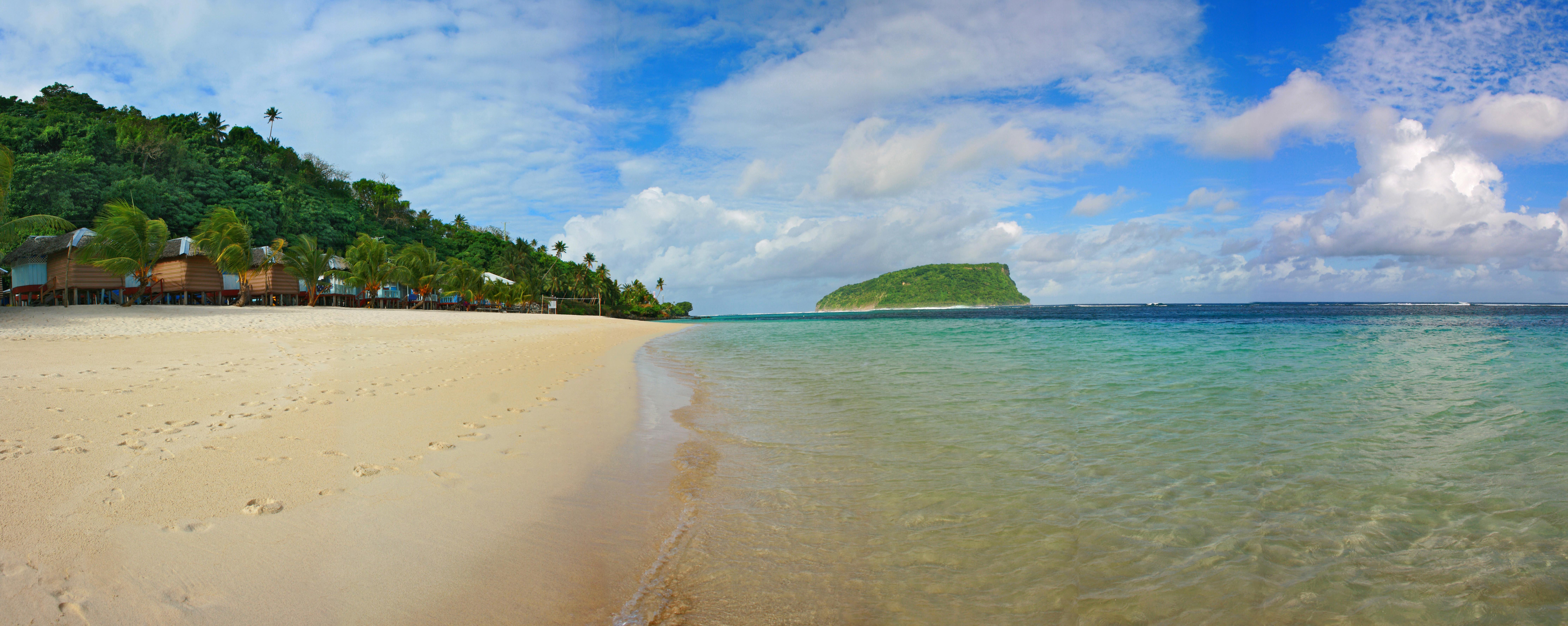

- Location within Samoa
- Coordinates: 14°2′43″S 171°26′27″W
- Country: Samoa
- District: Atua

Population (2016)
  - Total: 712
- Time zone: -11

Lalomanu is a village on the east coast of Upolu island in Samoa.The village is part of the electoral constituency (Faipule District) Aleipata Itupa i Luga which is within the larger political district of Atua. It has a population of 712.

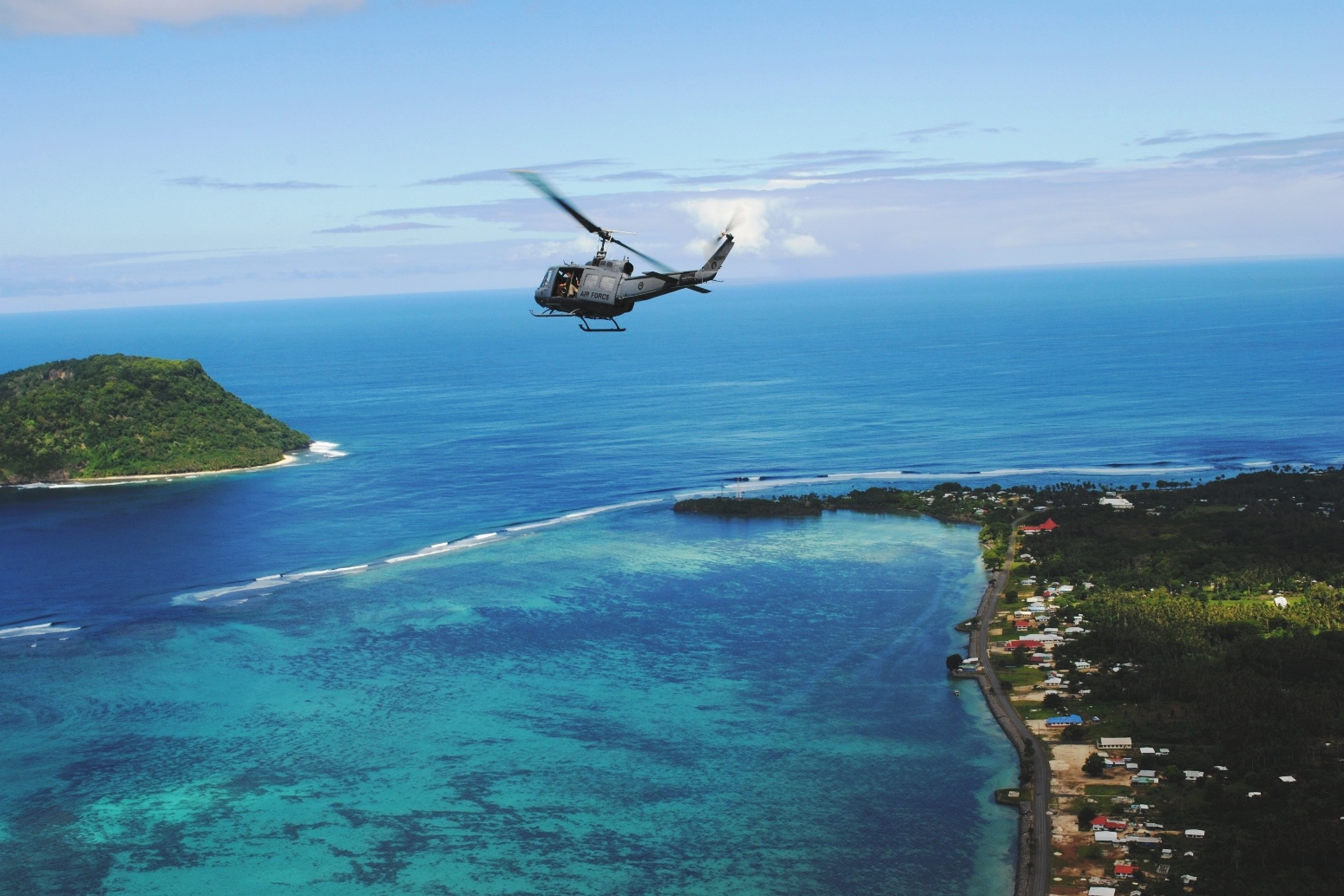
Lalomanu and Nu'utele island seen from the sky, 2012.

Lalomanu is approximately 1 hour and 15 minutes drive from the Apia, the country's capital.

== 2009 Samoa tsunami ==
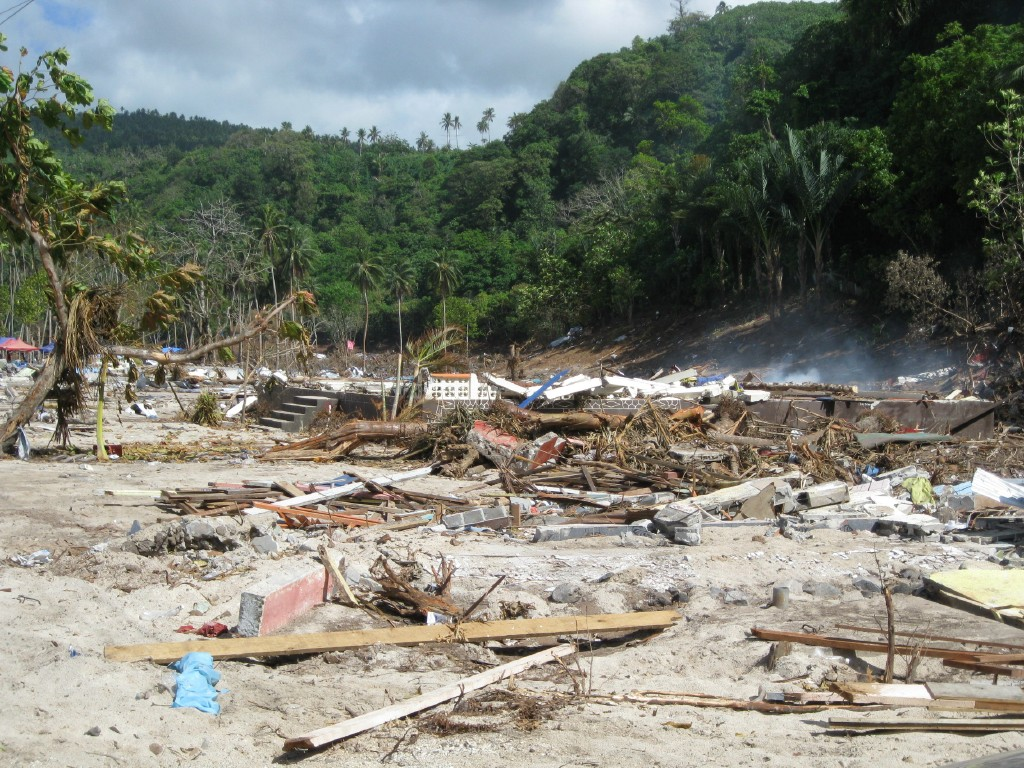
The remains of Lalomanu village after the tsunami in 2009.

Lalomanu was heavily damaged in the 2009 Samoa tsunami with fatalities following an earthquake south of the Samoa Islands on 29 September 2009.
