= Samata-i-Tai =

Coordinates: 13°39′23.92″S 172°38′49.29″W

Samata-i-Tai is a village on the island of Savai'i in Samoa. It is situated on the south coast of the island in the district of Satupa'itea and the electoral district of Salega 1. The population of the village as of the 2021 census was 496, up from 416 in 2016.
