= Lano, Samoa =

Village on the island of Savai'i in Samoa

Coordinates: 13.613°S 172.201°W

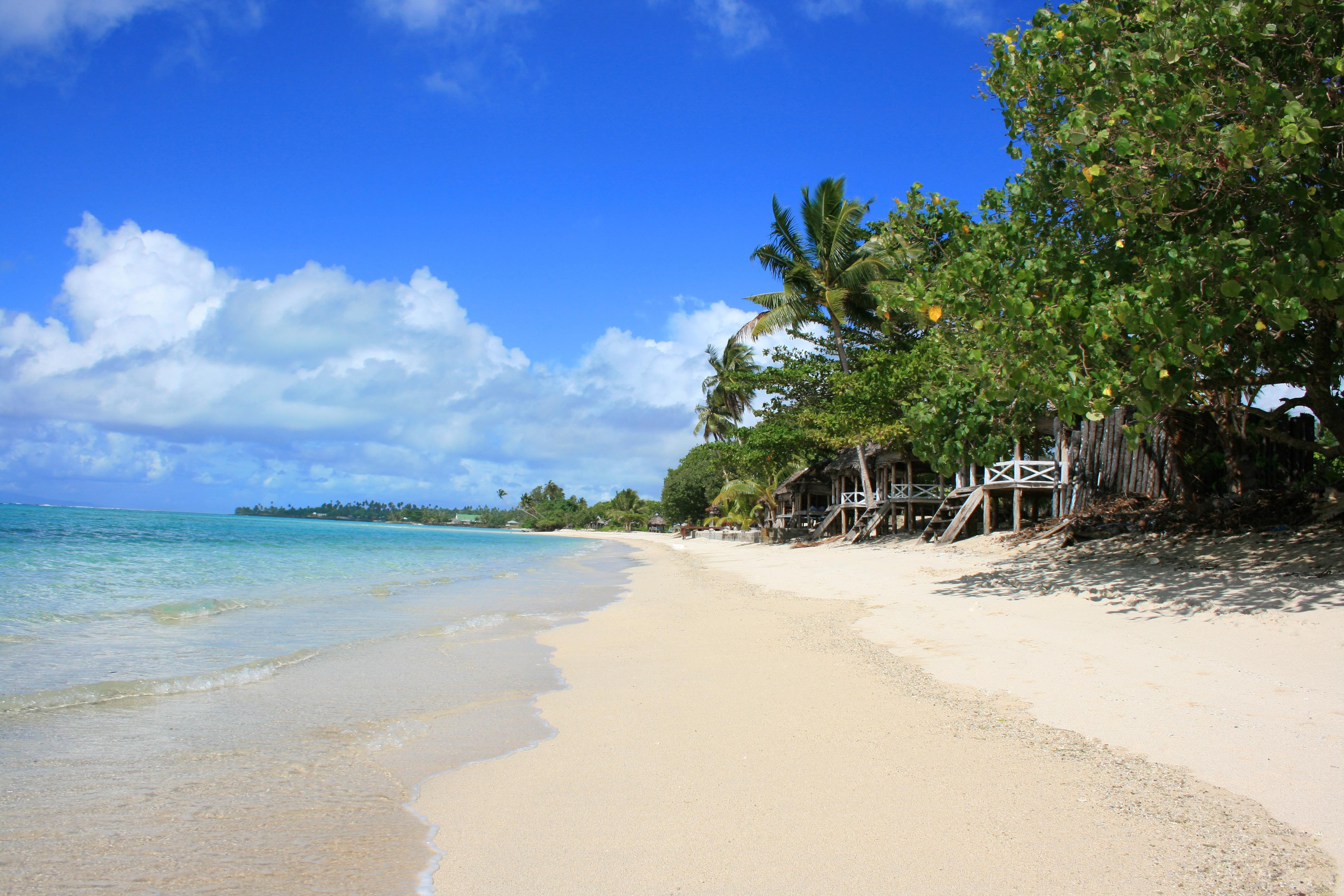
Lano beach

Lano is a village on the north east coast of Savai'i island in Samoa. The village is part of the electoral constituency (Faipule District) Fa'asaleleaga 5 which is within the larger political district (Itumalo) of Fa'asaleleaga. The population is 695.

The village has white sandy beaches by the main island road and there are beach fale for visitors and tourists and reef breaks for surfing.

In 2008 the village banned the sale of sand from its beach due to environmental concerns.
