= Foailalo =

Village in Samoa

Coordinates: 13°40′S 172°34′W

Foailuga is a village on the island of Savai'i in Samoa. It is situated on the south coast of the island in the district of Palauli and the electoral district of Palauli 1. The population is 335.
