= Salelavalu Tai =

Village on the island of Savai'i in Samoa

Coordinates: 13°43′S 172°12′W

Salelavalu Tai is a village at the east end of Savai'i island in Samoa. The village is part of the electoral constituency (Faipule District) Fa'asaleleaga 2 which is within the larger political district (Itumalo) of Fa'asaleleaga.

The population 488.
