= Sataua =

Coordinates: 13°31′4″S 172°41′44″W

Sataua is a village on the island of Savai'i in Samoa. It is situated at the northwestern end of the island in the district of Vaisigano. The population is 833.
