= Vavau, Samoa =

Village in Samoa

Coordinates: 14°01′S 171°29′W

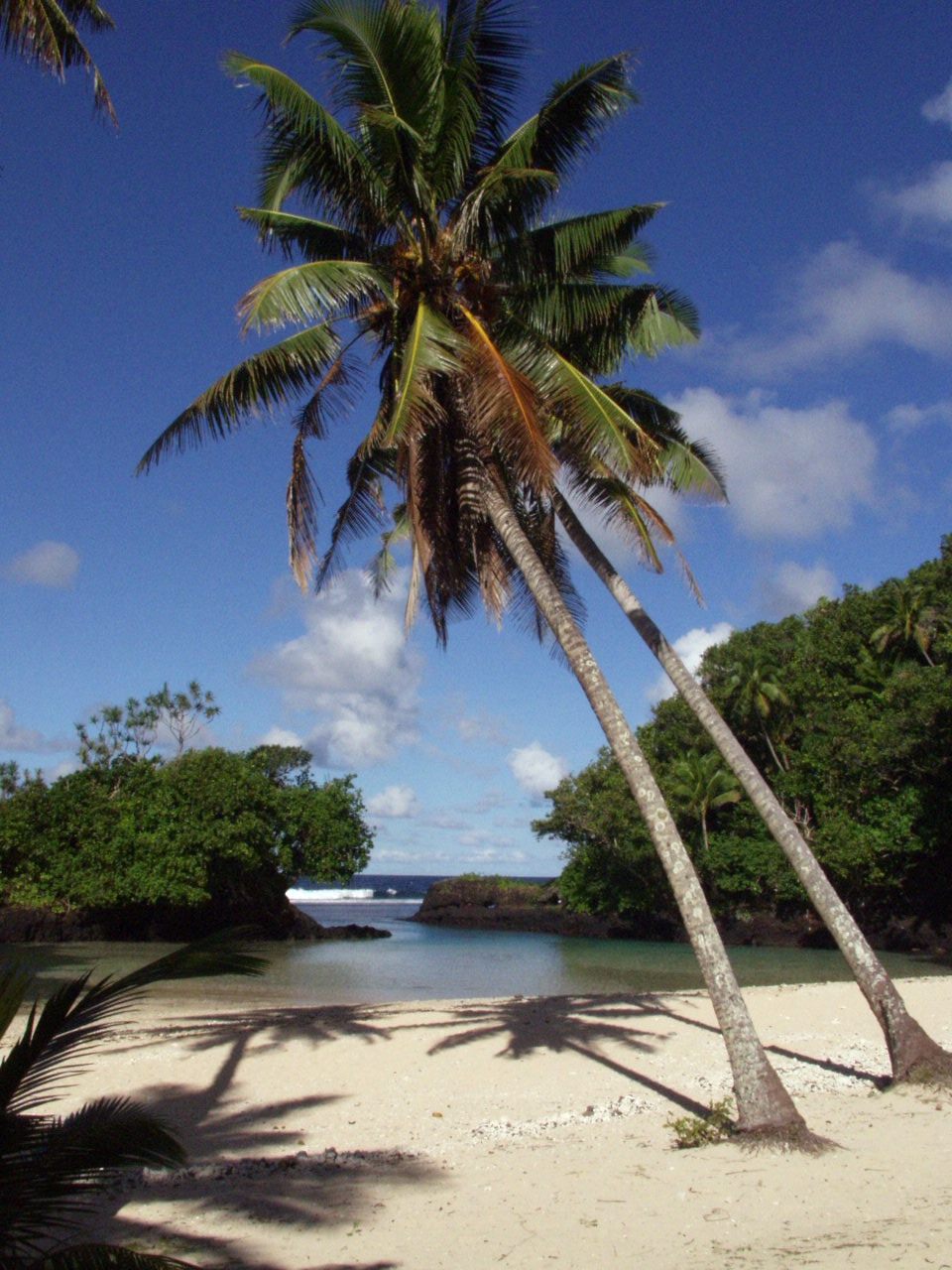
Vavau beach

Vavau is a small village on south east end of Upolu island in Samoa. The village is part of the Lotofaga Electoral Constituency (Faipule District) which is within the larger political district of Atua.

The population is 380.

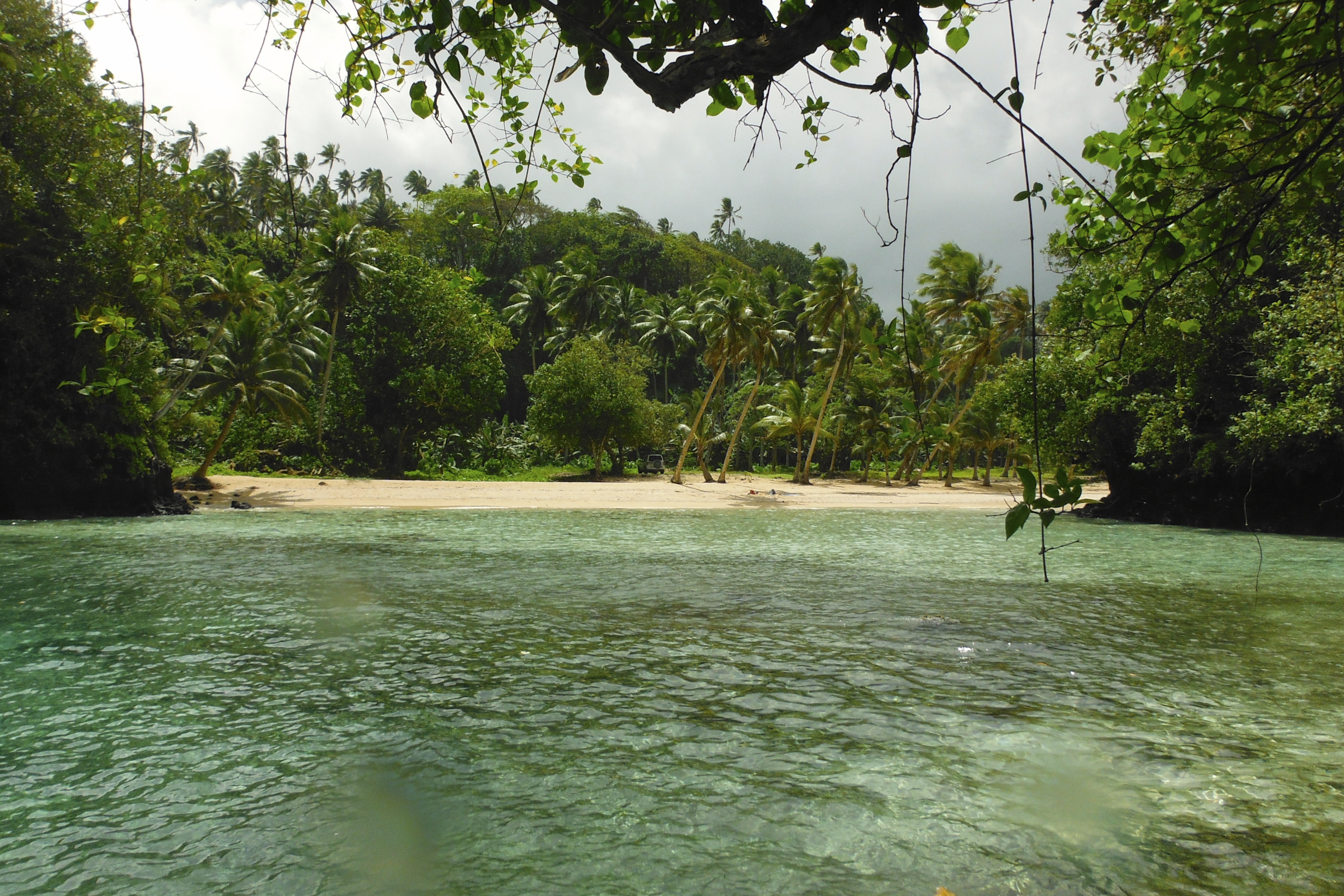
Vavau Beach viewed from the water

Before the 2009 tsunami, Vavau had a beach resort which was a popular getaway for locals on weekends and was also visited by overseas tourists. Vavau Beach is now deserted, but it is still accessible.
