= Fogasavai'i =

Village in Savai'i, Samoa

Coordinates: 13°41′S 172°38′W

Fogasavai'i is a village on the island of Savai'i in Samoa. It is situated on the south coast of the island in the district of Satupa'itea and the electoral district of Salega 2. The population is 354.
