= Fai'a'ai =

Coordinates: 13°40′S 172°38′W

Fai'a'ai is a village on the island of Savai'i in Samoa. It is situated on the south coast of the island in the district of Satupa'itea and the electoral district of Salega 1. The population is 397.

Fai'a'ai is known in the myths and legends of Samoa as the place where the warrior nafanua was exposed to her enemies as a female. There is a slight slope in Faia'ai known as "Malae O Le Ma"
