= Neiafu, Samoa =

Village in Samoa

Coordinates: 13°31′S 172°43′W

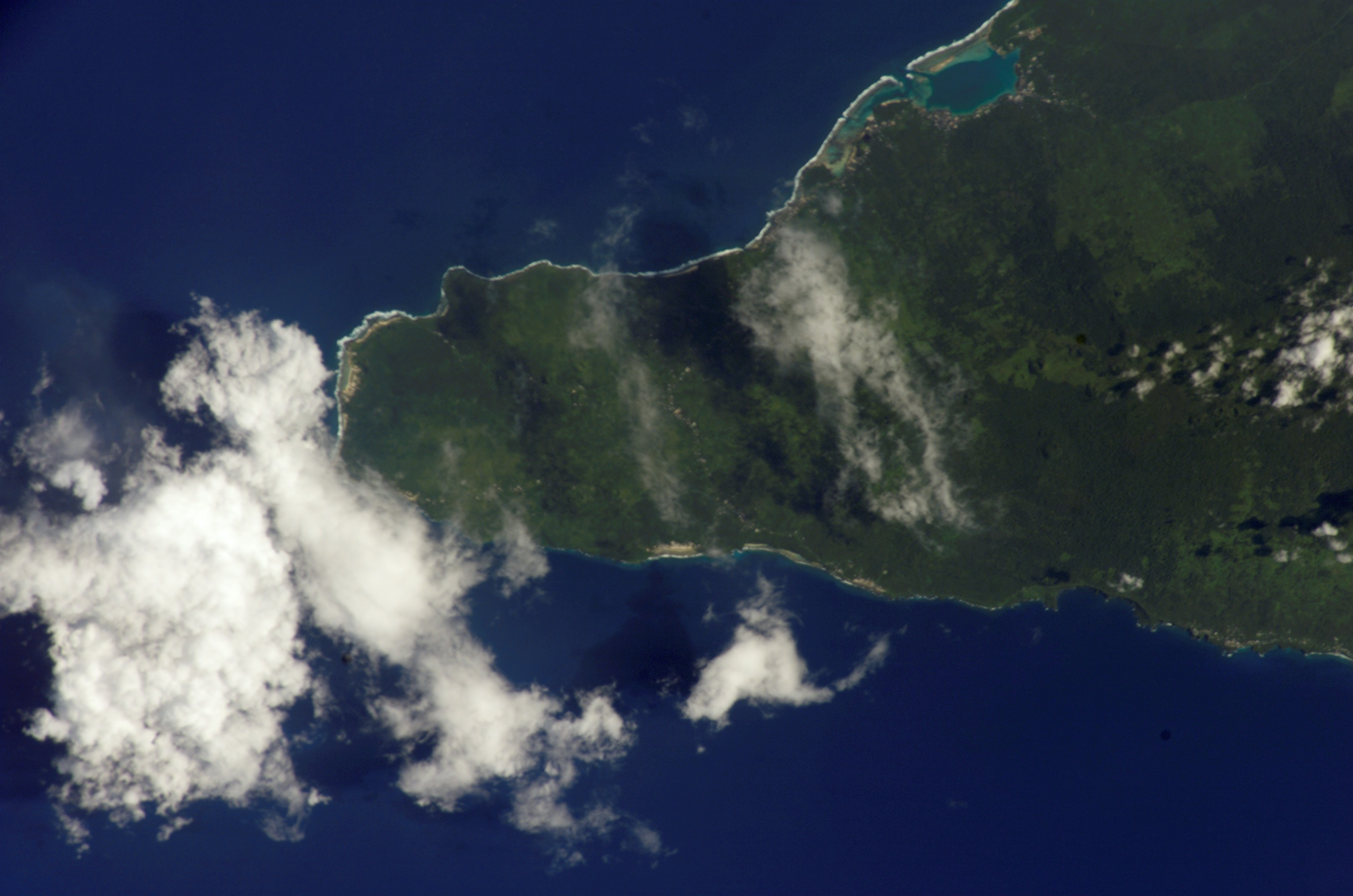
Satellite image of western end of Savai'i island. (NASA photo, 2002)

Neiafu is a village on the island of Savai'i in Samoa. It is in the Alataua Sisifo electoral district and located at the south west corner of the island. The population of Neiafu Uta is 601 and Neiafu Tai is 307.

Like many villages in Samoa, Neiafu has two settlements Neiafu Tai (coastal) and Neiafu Uta (inland). The settlement was previously situated by the sea, but with the advent of the modern island road, many families have moved several kilometers inland for convenience. The inland settlement, Neiafu Uta, is relatively recent. The village has close kinship ties to Satupa'itea village.

Neiafu-Tai is also famous in Samoan history, this is where the last Tongan warriors got on their ships and left Samoa at the end of Tongan domination of the archipelago. As they left, Tu'i Tonga said: Mālie toa, mālie tau - "brave warriors, bravely fought". The Samoan chiefly family Malietoa takes it name from this event.

Notable people from Neiafu are Opeta Palepoi who was a member of the Manu Samoa rugby team.
