= Asau, Samoa =

Village in Vaisigano, Samoa

Asau
- Village & Sub-district
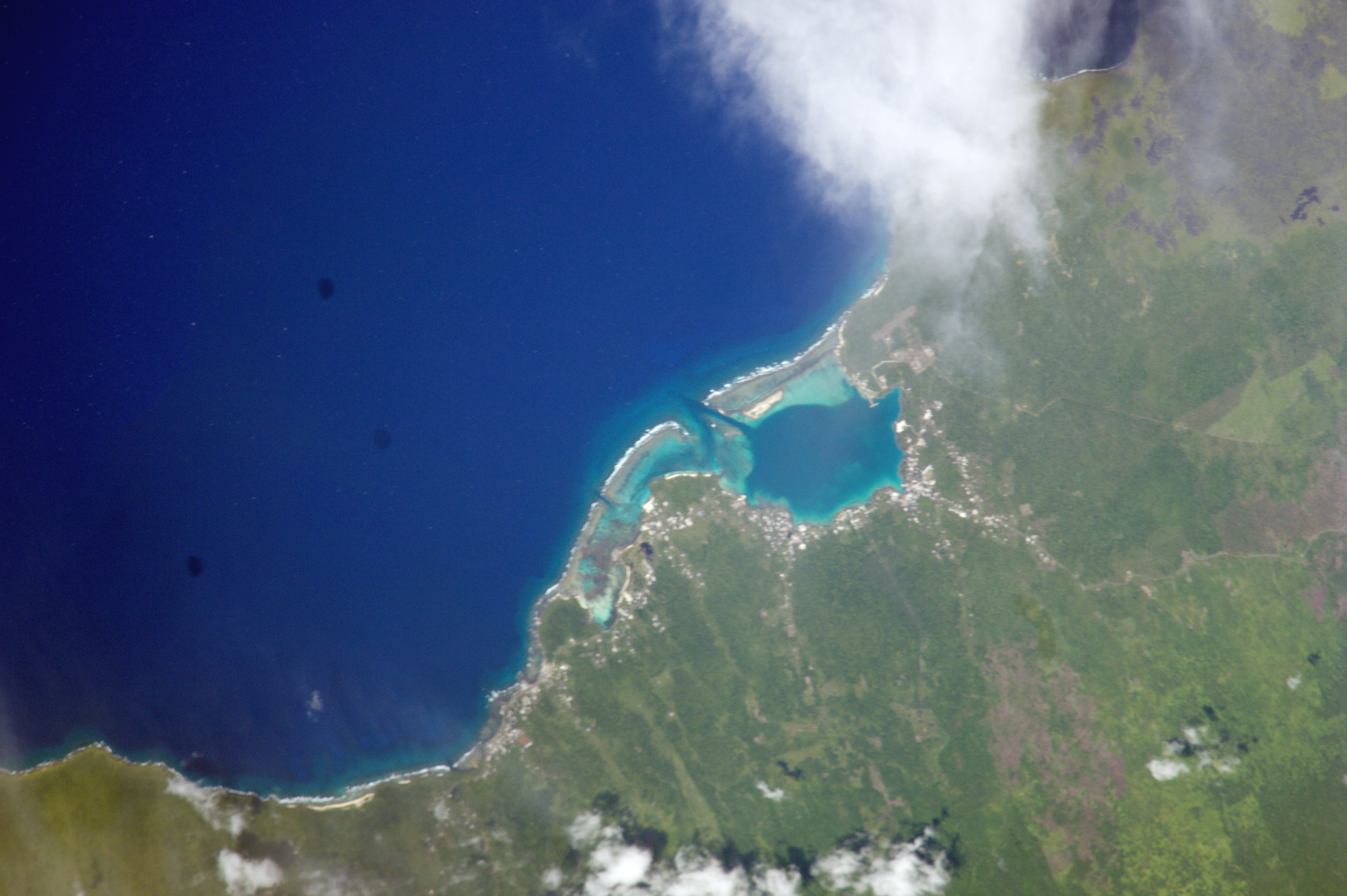
- Asau, Savai'i north west coast, NASA photo at an altitude of 192 nautical miles (356 km)

- Location within Samoa
- Coordinates: 13°31′9.8″S 172°38′14″W
- Country: Samoa
- District: Vaisigano

Population (2016)
  - Total: 1,133
- Time zone: +13
- Climate: Am

Asau is a village situated on the north west coast of Savai'i island in Samoa. It is the capital village of the Vaisigano political district and serves as the main business centre at the west end of the island. The population in 2016 was 1133, a decrease from 1207 in 2011.

The eastern part of the village was destroyed by a lava flow from Mauga Afi in the mid 18th century. Its name is derived from two words: a (what) and sau (come), and may be a linguistic trace of the eruption.

The Asau Airport is an airstrip primarily used for chartered flights. In 2008, an American development company, South Pacific Development, based in Honolulu, made plans to expand Asau Airport and harbour. The company has obtained a 120-year lease for 600 acres (2.4 km^{2}) of prime oceanfront customary land in Sasina village, to build a luxury resort estimated to cost $450 – $500 million US dollars.

The breakwater protecting the bay is an old American airstrip from World War II.

In 1998, bushfires destroyed 30,000 hectares (300 km^{2}) in the area. A further series of fires in September 2008 destroyed more than two thousand acres (8 km^{2}).

== Wharf ==
Asau was noted as having the best harbour in Samoa, being well protected on the north and west by coral reefs, though the shallowness of the passage made it useable only by light craft. The German colonial government considered opening the passage and developing a harbour there.

In 1963 a report on Savai'i's economic development recommended the construction of a new town and deep-water port at Asau. 6,035 acres (2,442 ha) of government land was set aside for the town. Funding was secured in 1964, and construction was completed in 1966, but the opening of the port was repeatedly delayed due to difficulties clearing a channel through the reef. One attempt to blast a channel by the New Zealand navy resulted in the largest explosion in Samoan history. In 1969 a dredge was damaged, and in 1972 the project was labelled a fiasco by the Samoa Times. The harbour was upgraded in 2011, but is still blocked by coral.

In 2019 the Samoan government announced a feasibility study into plans for a wharf at Asau. In 2020 it asked China to provide funds for the development.

== Forestry ==
Asau was the centre of the timber industry in Samoa with logging of native forests. In 1966 US timber company Potlatch Forests proposed to develop the timber industry on Savai'i, construct a sawmill and use the Asau wharf for exports. A deal was signed in March 1968, but the failure of the wharf project saw the company depart in 1977.

== Temperature record ==
On 24 December 1968, Asau recorded a temperature of 35.3 °C (95.5 °F), which is the highest temperature to have ever been recorded in Samoa.

== Notable people ==
- Leilua Lino - human rights activist
