= Vaisigano =

Coordinates: 13°32′S 172°44′W

- District
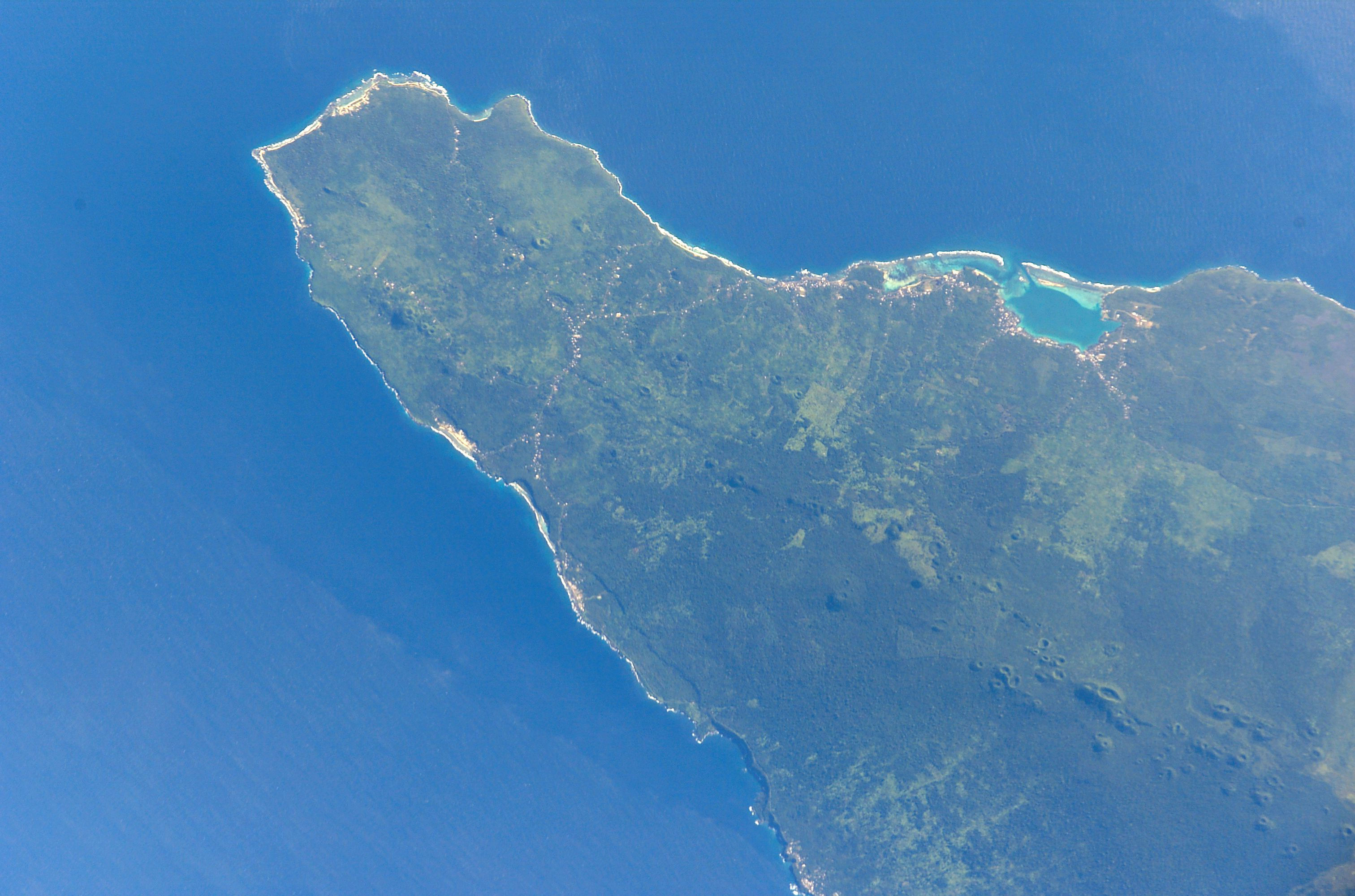
- Satellite photo of Vaisigano district showing west coast and Asau Bay on the north, west end of Savai'i island. (NASA photo)

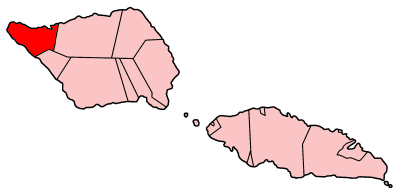
- Map of Samoa showing Vaisigano district
- Country: Samoa

Population (2016)
  - Total: 6,543
- Time zone: -11

Vaisigano is a political district at the western tip of Savai'i island in Samoa. The capital of the district is Asau.

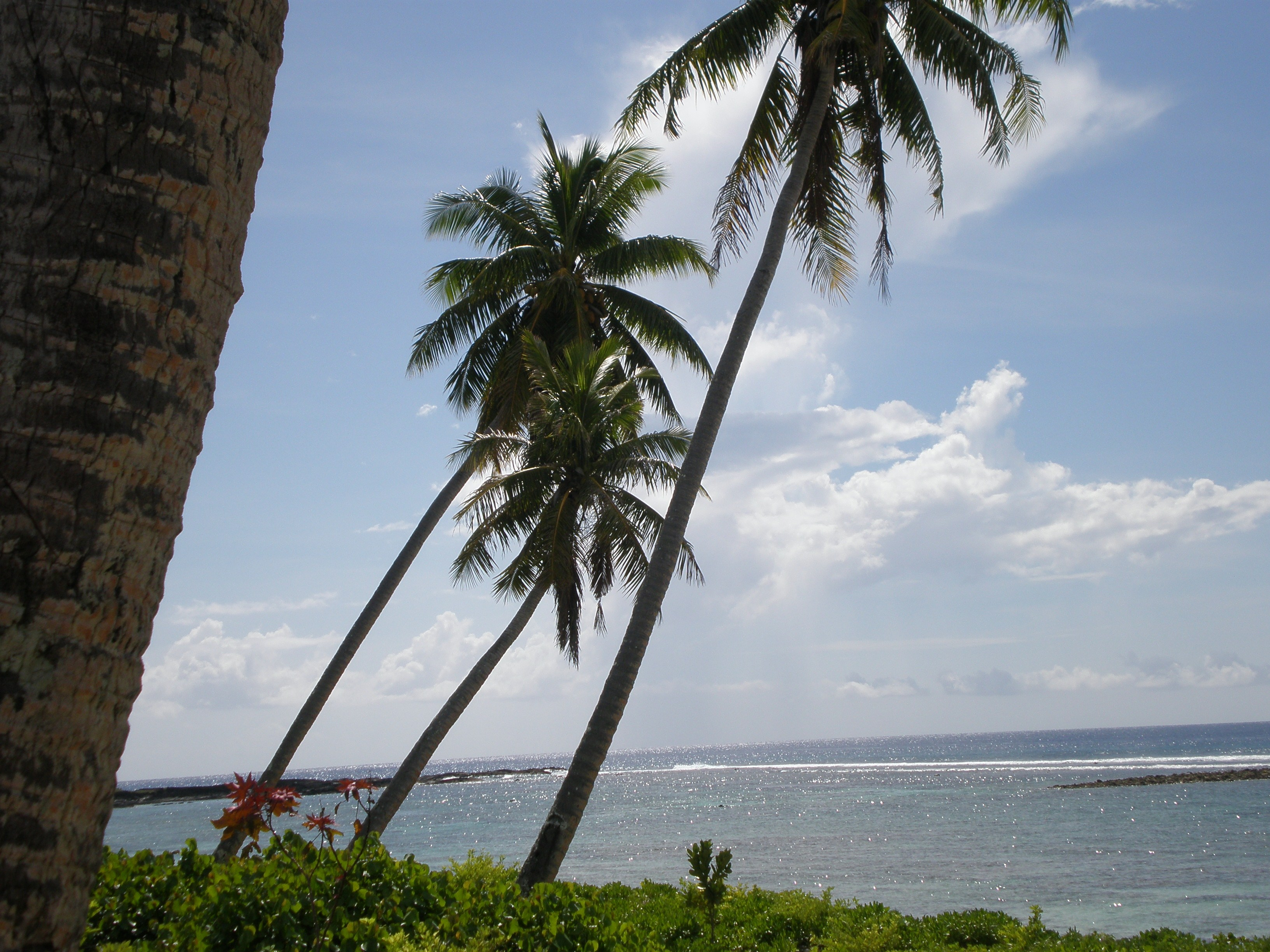
Looking west from Falealupo beach

This area is also referred to as 'Itu Asau' (Asau district) in the Samoan language.

The population of Vaisigano is 6,543 (2016 Census).

Within the district is the village of Vaisala whose chief Va'ai Kolone became the Prime Minister of Samoa twice in the 1980s. Kolone also founded the Human Rights Protection Party (HRPP), the dominant party in Samoan politics which is currently in power.

There is a conservation area with a turtle habitat at the village of Auala and a rainforest reserve in Falealupo at the westernmost tip of the island.

Vaisigano district has strong links to the Tonumaipe'a chiefly title and at a national level, the TuiA'ana.

== Politicians ==
- A'eau Peniamina, Member of Parliament for Falealupo constituency.

== See also ==
- Fa'amatai, chiefly system of the Samoa Islands
- List of schools in Savai'i
