= Palauli =

Coordinates: 13°42′S 172°28′W

- District
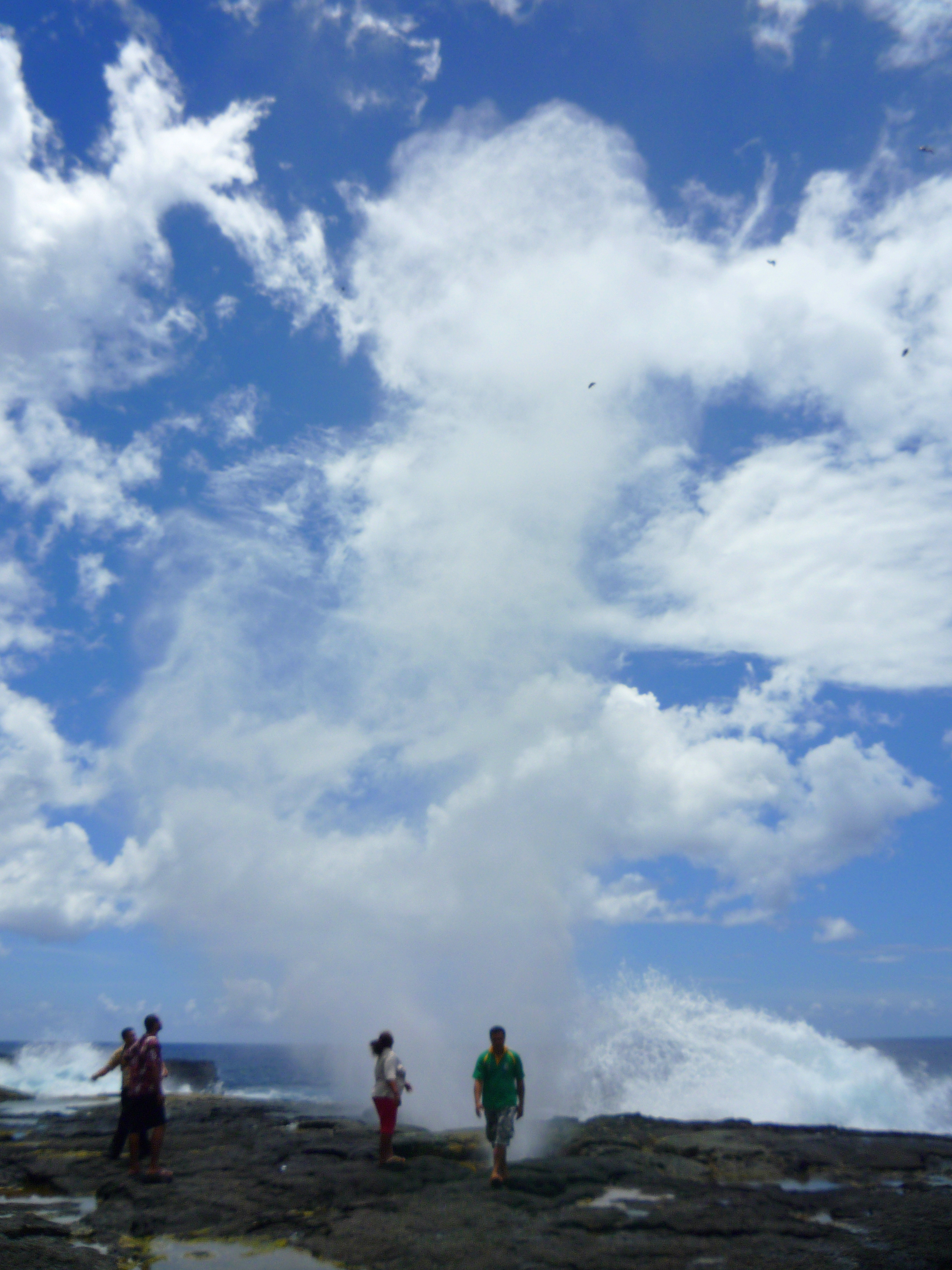
- Taga blowholes on the coast.

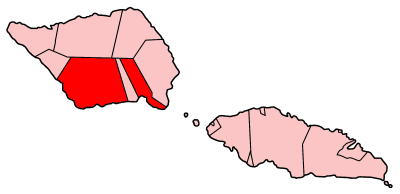
- Map of Samoa showing Palauli district
- Country: Samoa

Population (2016)
  - Total: 9,300
- Time zone: -11

Palauli is a district and village of Samoa, with a population (2016 Census) of 9,300. It consists of two sections on the southern side of Savai'i. The capital is Vailoa which is also referred to as Vailoa i Palauli (Vailoa in Palauli district).

Geological formations of lava tubes have created the Taga Blowholes on the coast of Taga village and attracts visitors and tourists.

In recent years, the inland village of Sili has refused to let the government of Samoa build a hydroelectric power plant on traditional land due to conservation and cultural concerns.

The paramount title of this district is Lilomaiava, which is conferred in Vailoa. As part of the selection process for the title-holder, Vailoa must consult Safotu village in the Gagaifomauga political district. Safotu is the northern base of the Lilomaiava title in Savai'i.

== Archaeology ==
Extensive pre-historic settlements have been surveyed and studied in the Palauli district where the Pulemelei Mound is situated.

== Notable people ==
- Jay Laga'aia, from Faala village is an actor, Laga'aia is known for his part on Australian children's TV show Playschool, and also for his role as Captain Typho in the films Star Wars: Episode II – Attack of the Clones and Star Wars: Episode III – Revenge of the Sith. He played the role of Draco in several episodes of the television series Xena: Warrior Princess.
- Uale Mai, from Vailoa village, is a rugby union player and former captain of the Samoa Sevens team and one of the great players in the international sport. He is the only Samoan to be awarded the IRB International Sevens Player of the Year which he received for the 2005–06 World Sevens Series.

== Gallery ==
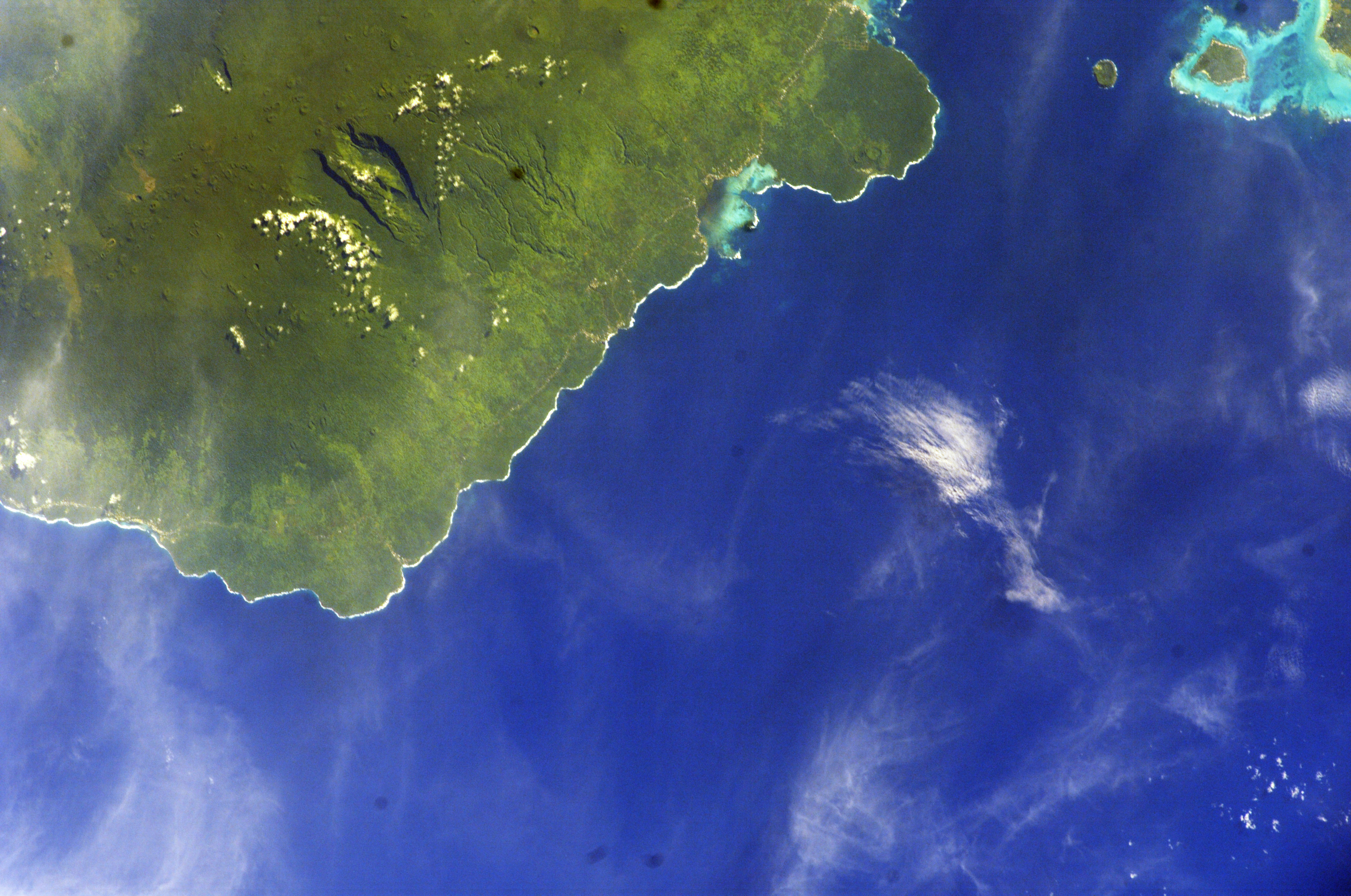
Satellite photo of Palauli and Satupa'itea districts, southside of Savai'i island. (NASA photo).

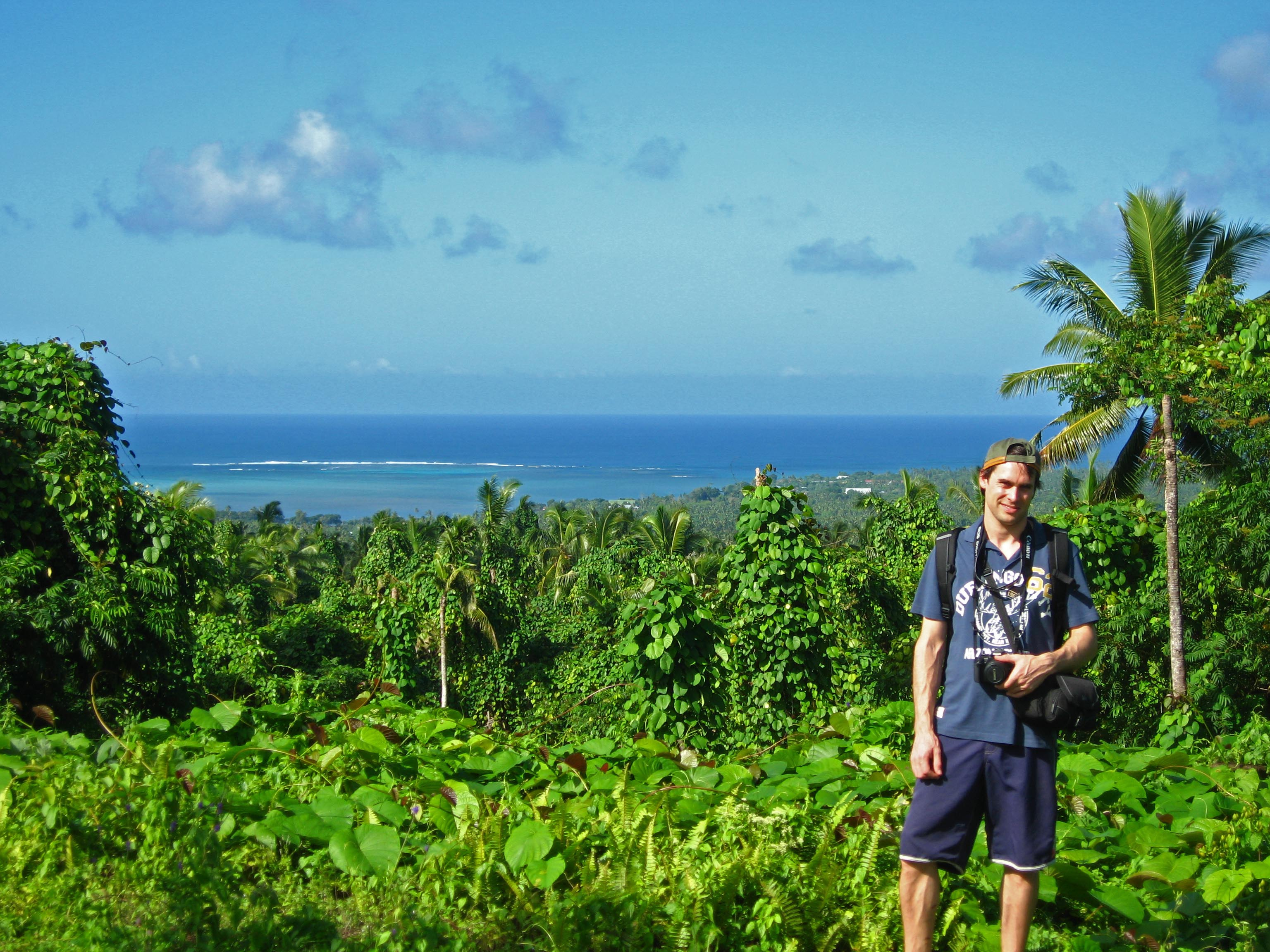
View from Pulemelei Mound

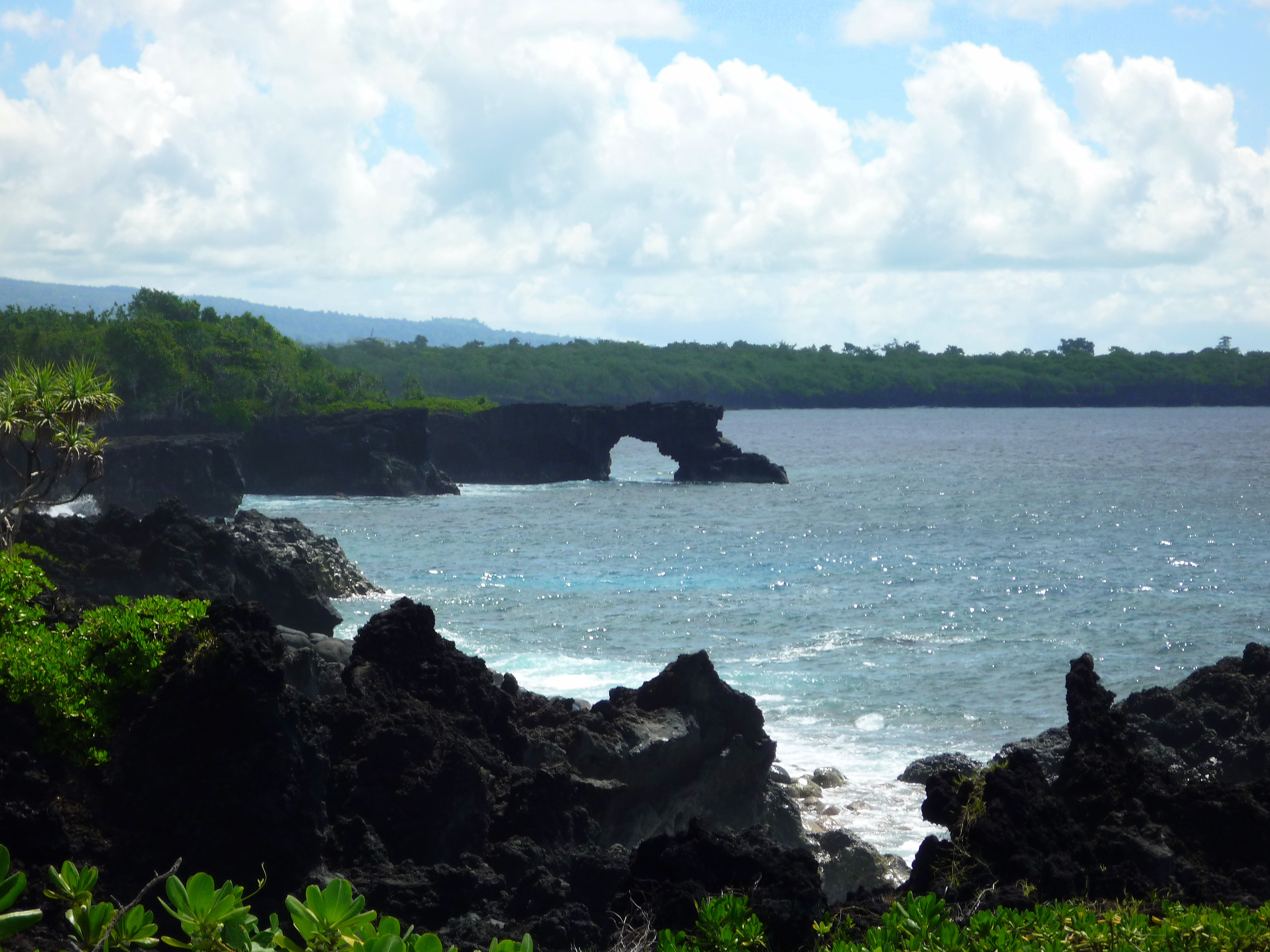
Volcanic coastline.

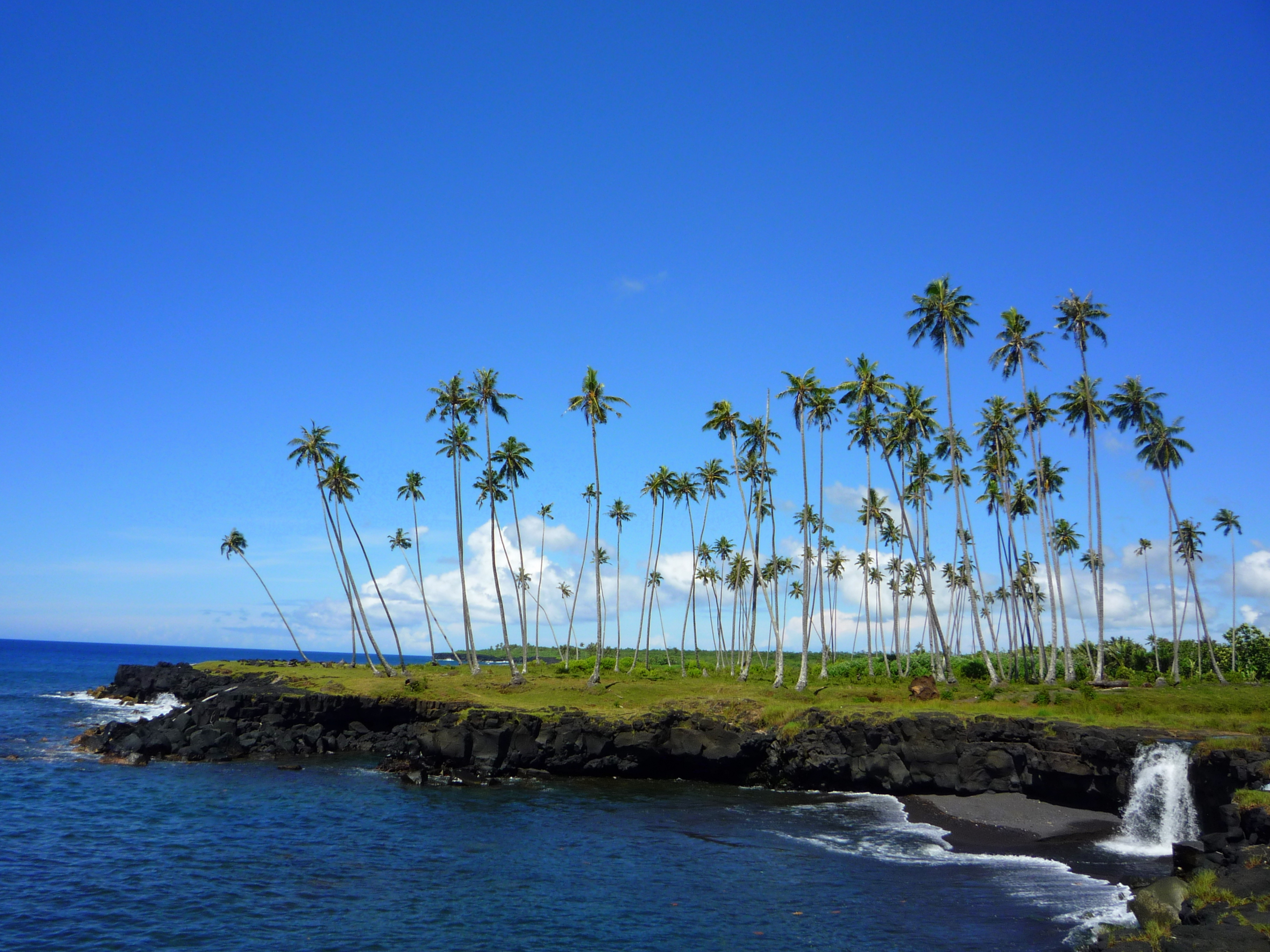
Mu Pagoa Falls by the sea.

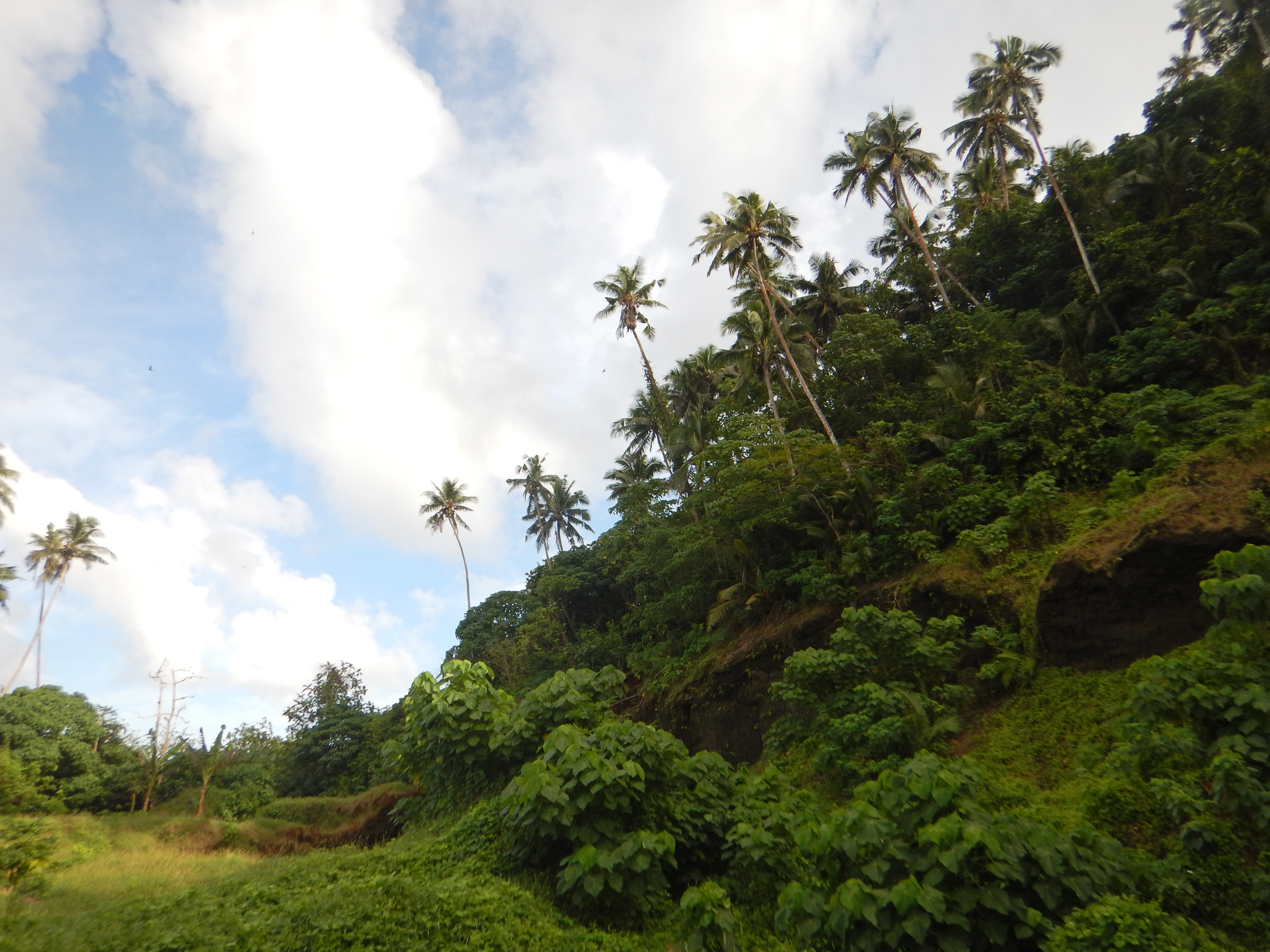
Southern Tafua Peninsula

== See also ==
- List of schools in Savai'i
