= Faʻasaleleaga =

Coordinates: 13°40′S 172°15′W

- District
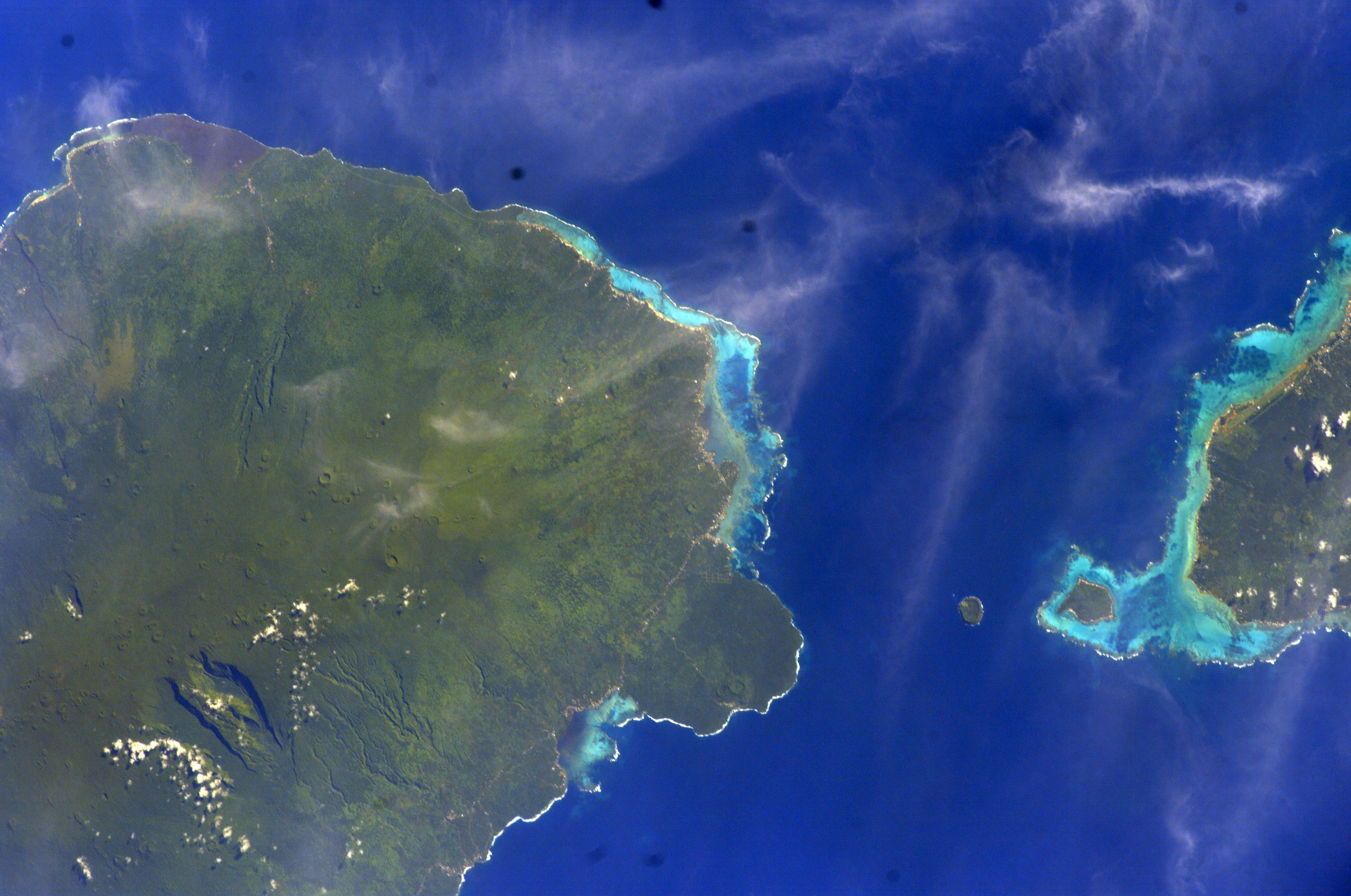
- Satellite image of eastern half of Savaiʻi island (left of photo) with tiny Apolima & Manono islands and the western tip of Upolu. (NASA photo, 2006)

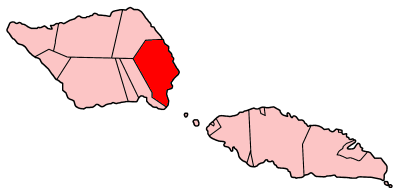
- Map of Samoa showing Faʻasaleleaga district
- Country: Samoa

Population (2016)
  - Total: 13,566
- Time zone: +13

Faʻasaleleaga is a district of Samoa situated on the eastern side of Savaiʻi island. It has a population of 13,566 (2016 Census).

The traditional capital is Safotulafai where district chiefs and orators meet at Fuifatu malae. Safotulafai was the main base of the 'Mau a Pule' resistance movement against colonial rule, which grew into the national Mau movement and eventually Samoa's political independence in 1962. Safotulafai also has close traditional links with Saleaula, the main village of the Gaga'emauga district.

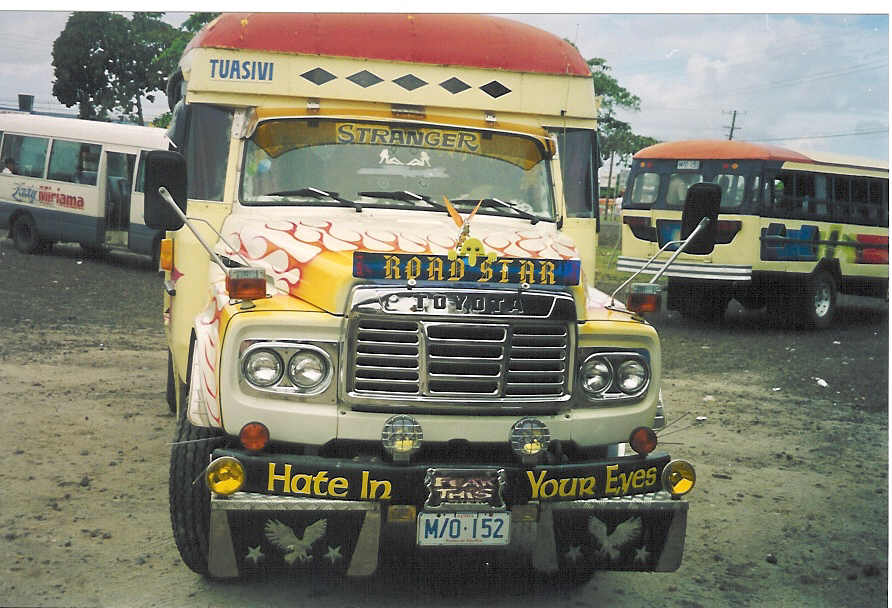
Tuasivi local bus on Savaiʻi island

Faʻasaleleaga is a major Malietoa area with close political ties to the Tuamasaga district on Upolu island. Safotulafai is always consulted by Malie village (Tuamasaga) in conjunction with Manono (Aiga-i-le-Tai) in the election of Malietoa title-holders.

Historically, another important village in this district is Sapapaliʻi, where John Williams, the first missionary to bring Christianity to Samoa, landed in 1830. It was here that Malietoa Vaiinupo received Williams. Sapapali'i had become the second Malietoa base in the district in 1750 when Malietoa Ti'a moved here.

In the 20th century, Salelologa has become the main township for shopping and public amenities on the island. Salelologa wharf is the main ferry terminal for inter-island passenger and vehicle boats between Savaiʻi and Mulifanua wharf on Upolu.

Maota Airport is the main airfield on the island, located 10 minutes south of Salelologa.

The village of Tuasivi, 10 minutes north of Salelologa, is the main government (Malo) administration centre on the island with a district hospital, courthouses, police station and post office.

Geographically, Faʻasaleleaga district is located at latitude (-13.67 degrees) 13° 40' 11" south of the equator and longitude (-172.12 degrees) 172° 7' 12" west of the prime meridian on the world map.

== See also ==
- List of schools in Savai'i
