= List of rivers of Samoa =

The rivers of Samoa are listed below by island in alphabetical order.

== Savai'i ==
- Lata River
- Maliolio River
- Sili River

== Upolu ==
- Afulilo River
- Fagataloa River
- Falefa River
- Falevai River
- Fululasau River
- Leafe River
- Malata River
- Mulivai River
- Mulivaifagatola River
- Namo River
- Tafitoala River
- Vailima River
- Vaisigano River
