= Lata River =

Location
- Country: Samoa

Physical characteristics
- Source
  - location: Slopes of Mauga Mua
  - coordinates: 13°39′S 172°24′W
  - elevation: 1,190 metres (3,900 ft)
- Mouth
  - coordinates: 13°46′36″S 172°22′43″W
  - elevation: 0.0 metres (0 ft)
- Length: 11 km (6.8 mi)

The Lata River is a river on the island of Savai'i in the Pacific island nation of Samoa. It is located in the south of the island, flowing through the Palauli district.

The river's course begins in a broad valley in the Central Savai'i Rainforest. Its course is generally southerly, flowing close to the boundary with Satupa'itea district. It passes through the small town of Sili, where it is joined by a major tributary, before reaching the Pacific Ocean at the settlement of Puleia. At its mouth, the river flows over a small cataract, Mu Pagoa Waterfall.
