= Puleia =

Coordinates: 13°46′35″S 172°22′35″W

Puleia is a village on the island of Savai'i in Samoa. It is situated on the south coast of the island in the district of Palauli and the electoral district of Palauli 2. The population is 265.

The Lata River reaches the ocean at Puleia.
