= Patamea =

- Village
- Location within Samoa
- Coordinates: 13°31′27″S 172°18′22″W
- Country: Samoa
- District: Gaga'emauga

Population (2016)
  - Total: 649
- Time zone: -11

Patamea is a village on the island of Savai'i in Samoa. While most villages on Savai'i are situated near the sea, Patamea is situated inland, away from the coast. The village is in the Gaga'emauga political district near the central north coast of the island. The population is 649.

Heading north west on the main road from Salelologa township and ferry terminal, the turnoff to Patamea is just before Samalaeʻulu village at a T-junction of the road. Turning left (south west direction) at the junction is the road to Patamea, which lies 2 km from the main road. The road is tar sealed to the village.

== Geography ==
The nearest villages to Patamea are Samalaeʻulu and Mauga, a village built around the rim of a small volcanic crater. The main tar-sealed road circling Savai'i, which generally follows the coastline around the island where most villages are situated, runs inland where these settlements are located. The main road is considered a life-line for these inland villages for access to schools, churches and nearest hospitals at Tuasivi and Safotu. However, at Samalaeʻulu village, the main road crosses a ford at Maliolio River which can become inaccessible during flooding. The river overflowing can also make access to plantations impassable along local roads which cross Molioli River in parts. Loss of access to plantations can have economic and health impacts on the villagers.

In 2007, Patamea and neighbouring villages, came under a Coastal Infrastructure Management Plan by the Government of Samoa to help communities prepare for any type of emergency. Under the plan, the government is responsible for public and district infrastructure while villages are responsible for implementing approved projects locally.

== Economy ==
Like most villages in Samoa, the village of Patamea is based on a cash economy driven by traditional work, mostly in plantations although there is some cattle farming as well as family members working in the capital Apia on the main island Upolu. As the village is situated inland with no coast access, there is little fishing.

In 2006, the Patamea Primary School committee received $245,000 Samoan tala, to rebuild the school, from the Japanese Government Grassroots Human Sector Grant Aid Programme.
