= Maliolio River =

Location
- Country: Samoa

Physical characteristics
- Source
  - location: Slopes of Mount Mata'aga
  - coordinates: 13°36′10″S 172°25′20″W
  - elevation: 1,270 metres (4,170 ft)
- Mouth
  - coordinates: 13°30′05″S 172°16′35″W
  - elevation: 0.0 metres (0 ft)
- Length: 26 km (16 mi)

The Maliolio (or Mali'oli'o) River is one of the largest rivers in the Pacific island nation of Samoa. It is located in the northeast of the island of Savai'i, flowing through the Gaga'emauga district.

The river initially flows northeastwards from the central volcanic highlands of the island, traversing dense forest for some 18 km. Shortly before it reaches Patamea it is joined by a stream which is its only major tributary, and the now enlarged river turns north. It continues northwards for about 5 km to Samalaeʻulu. Here, it turns east for its final 3 kilometres before reaching the Pacific Ocean.

The river is prone to flooding, often isolating villages such as Samalaeʻulu and Patamea which lie close to the river and are only accessible via fords. The river was crossed by the main north coast highway at one such ford at Samalaeʻulu. Work on realigning the highway and building a bridge began in 2018, and was completed in 2020.
