= Sili, Samoa =

Sili
- Village
- Location within Samoa
- Coordinates: 13°45′22″S 172°22′40″W
- Country: Samoa
- District: Palauli

Population (2016)
  - Total: 1,071
- Time zone: -11

Sili is a village on the south side of Savai'i island in Samoa. Sili is situated inland, unlike most villages in Samoa which are settlements by the sea. The village lies within the electoral constituency of Palauli 1. The population is 1071.

The people of Sili rely on subsistence agriculture for their livelihood. Due to its location away from the coast, fishing has minimal impact on the village economy. The Sili river, like most natural resources and land in Samoa, is situated on traditional land owned by the village. The river has cultural and historical significance for the people. Traditional knowledge and conservation is a key factor in village governance. Organic farming is used for all crops and the use of pesticides and chemicals are banned.

In recent years, Sili rejected a scheme by the government of Samoa to build a hydroelectric plant on village land due to environmental and cultural factors. The hydro project had received backing from the Asian Development Bank (ADB) which had been assisting the Samoan government and its Electric Power Corporation (EPC) to make high priority investment in renewable energy project. The ADB had given the government US$0.3million towards the hydro project in 2003. Village chiefs (matai) claimed the scheme would pollute their water and ruin the environment.
