= Faleu =

Historic village in Samoa

Coordinates: 13°52′S 172°06′W

Faleu is one of four small historic villages on Manono Island in Samoa in central South Pacific Ocean. The village population is 250.

The other villages on Manono Island are Lepuia'i, Apai and Salua. All the settlements on Manono Island fall within the political district of Aiga-i-le-Tai.

Faleu is the site of the official arrival of the Methodist mission. Methodist Rev. Peter Turner landed at Faleu on June 18, 1835. A memorial stands here to commemorate this historic event.

There are also subdivisions within these villages that notes the pito nu'u or smaller areas within the villages. Manono Tai is the local and traditional term for this island, as the word Tai means 'seaward'. Manono Uta is located on the main Upolu Island.

Despite the geographic separation of Manono Uta and Manono Tai, the people are one village with close kinship and history. The inhabitants of Manono Uta are family, kin of those who reside on Manono Tai.

Manono island is one of three isles in the Apolima Strait separating the country's two main islands Upolu and Savai'i. The other islands in the strait are Apolima and the tiny uninhabited islet of Nu'ulopa.
