= Lepuia'i =

Coordinates: 13°51′S 172°07′W

Lepuia'i is one of four small villages on Manono Island in Samoa in central South Pacific Ocean. The village population is 183.

The other villages on Manono island are Apai, Faleu and Salua.

All the settlements on Manono Island fall within the political district of Aiga-i-le-Tai.

Manono island is one of three isles in the Apolima Strait separating the country's two main islands Upolu and Savai'i. The other islands in the strait are Apolima and the tiny uninhabited islet of Nu'ulopa.
