= Apolima Tai =

Village in Aiga-i-le-Tai district, Western Samoa

Coordinates: 13.8202°S 172.1515°W

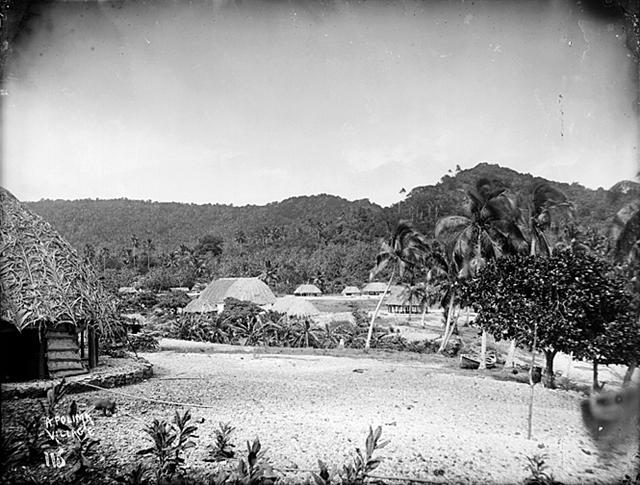
Apolima Tai village in Apolima Island, (1890 - 1910).

Apolima Tai is a village on the small volcanic island of Apolima in Samoa, on the north side in the political district of Aiga-i-le-Tai. Its population is 96. Apolima island is one of three in the Apolima Strait between Samoan's two main islands, Upolu and Savai'i. The others are Manono, which has four villages, and uninhabited Nu'ulopa.
