= Mulifanua =

Coordinates: 13°50′S 171°59′W

- Village District
- Location within Samoa
- Country: Samoa
- District: Aiga-i-le-Tai
- Time zone: +13

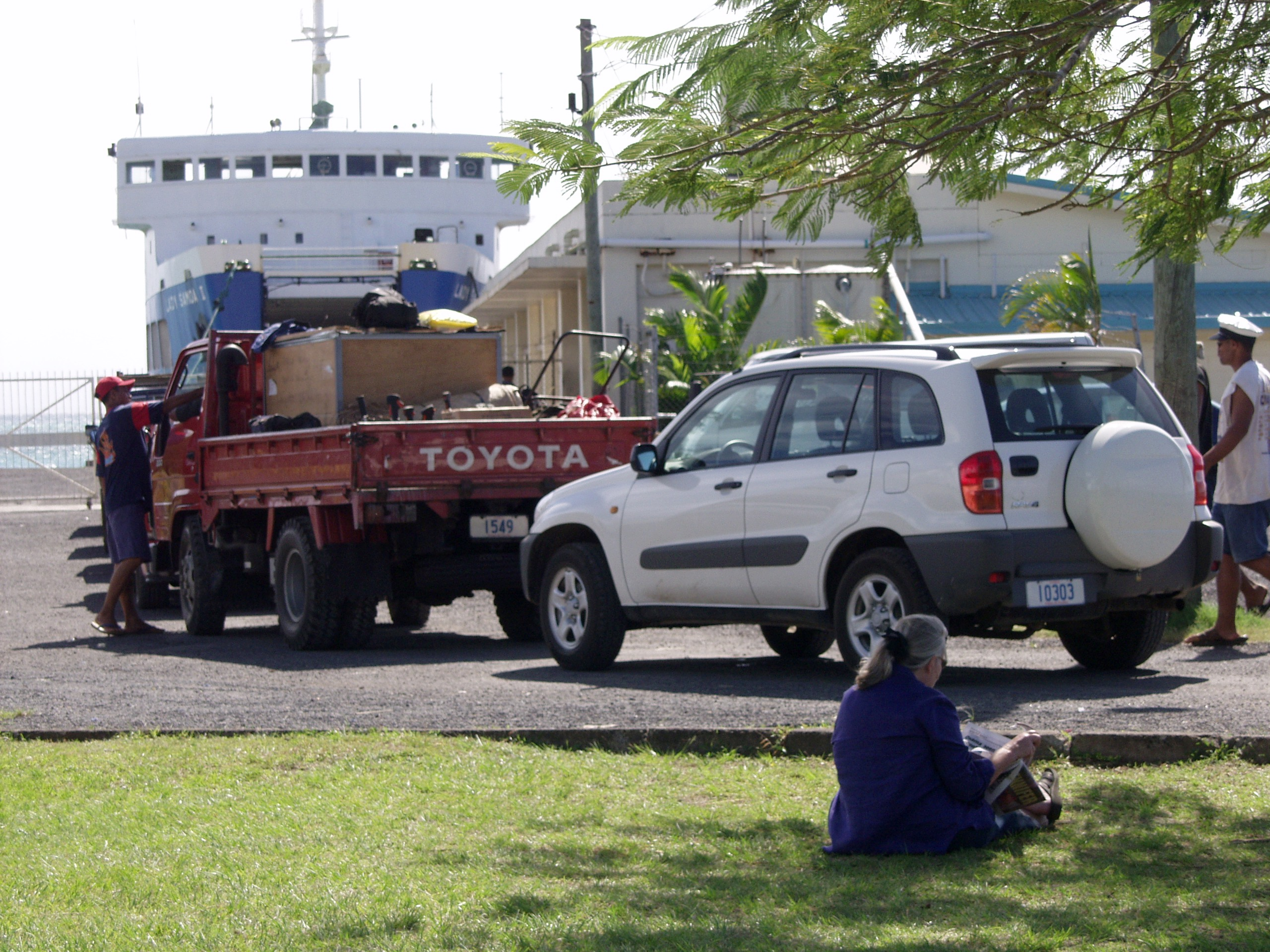
Cars wait for the Savai'i ferry

Mulifanua is a village on the north-western tip of the island of Upolu, in Samoa. In the modern era, it is the capital of Aiga-i-le-Tai district. Mulifanua wharf is the main ferry terminal for inter-island vehicle and passenger travel across the Apolima Strait between Upolu and the island of Savai'i.

== Ferry terminal ==
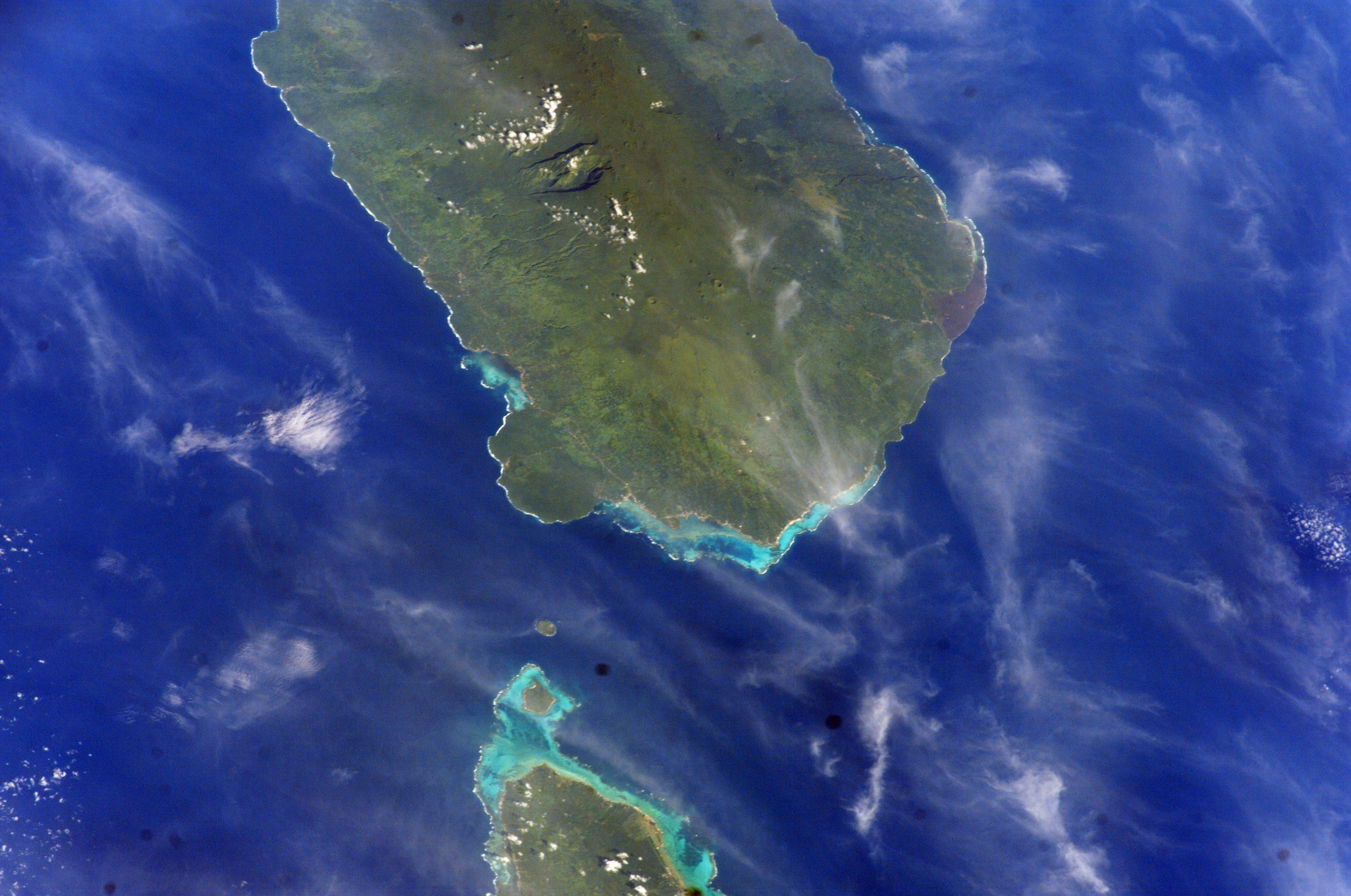
Satellite image showing the Apolima Strait between Savai'i (top of photo) and Upolu with tiny Apolima and Manono islands between them. (NASA photo)

The ferry terminal at Mulifanua wharf is five minutes west of Faleolo International Airport. The government's Samoa Shipping Corporation operates the ferry service, seven days a week, between Mulifanua and Salelologa at the east end of Savai'i island. A one-way trip between the two islands takes about 90 minutes. The ferry usually runs every two hours during the day. There are several small shops selling snacks, and there are always buses and taxis available at the terminal for departures and arrivals.

== Archaeology ==
In 1973, archaeology in Samoa uncovered a Lapita site at Mulifanua where 4,288 pottery sherds and two Lapita type adzes have been recovered. The site has a true age of circa 3,000 BP based on C14 dating on a shell. This is the only site in Samoa where decorated Lapita sherds have been found, although pieces of Polynesian plainware ceramics are commonly found throughout the Samoan islands. The submerged site was discovered during work carried out to expand the inter-island ferry berth at Mulifanua.

== 2007 South Pacific Games ==
Aggie Grey’s Resort and Spa at Mulifanua and Faleolo was the venue for the sailing and va'a (outrigger canoeing) events at the 2007 South Pacific Games.
