= Bengal Military Police =

Bengal Military Police was the title of two different units at different times:

- The Bengal Military Police, 1856–63, subsequently 45th Rattray's Sikhs
- The Bengal Military Police, 1891–1920, subsequently Eastern Frontier Rifles
