= Manono Uta =

Village in Aiga-i-le-Tai district, Western Samoa

Coordinates: 13°52′S 172°04′W

Manono Uta is a village on the island of Upolu in Samoa. It is situated on the north west coast of the island in the political district of Aiga-i-le-Tai.

The population is 1394.

== See also ==
- Manono Island
