= Renewable energy in Oceania =

This article summarises the status of renewable energy in Oceania.

The Pacific island nations are heavily dependent on costly fossil fuel imports, so they are turning, to varying degrees, to renewable energy. Options include household photovoltaic (PV) systems and hydroelectricity on the hillier islands.

== Melanesia ==
=== Fiji ===
The percentage of renewable electricity generation increased from 59% in 2013 to 65% in 2016. The Fiji Electricity Authority hopes to generate 81% renewably by 2020, from hydropower (c. 50% currently), biomass, solar energy and wind power.

=== Solomon Islands ===
Renewable electricity generation grew from <1% in 2013 to 5% in 2016.

=== Vanuatu ===
Renewable electricity generation grew from 16% in 2013 to 29% in 2016.

== Micronesia ==
Renewable electricity generation has risen from 0% in 2013 to 5% in 2016.

=== Federated States of Micronesia ===
Over 350 household solar systems were installed on Yap's outer islands.

=== Kiribati ===
Renewable electricity generation grew from 0.2% in 2013 to 10% in 2016.

=== Marshall Islands ===
Renewable electricity generation accounts for <1% as of 2016.

=== Nauru ===
Renewable electricity generation grew from <1% in 2013 to 3.2% in 2016.

=== Palau ===
Renewable electricity generation grew from 0.4% in 2013 to 2.3% in 2016.

== Polynesia ==
=== Cook Islands ===
The percentage of renewable electricity generation grew from 3% in 2013 to 15% in 2016. Four PV-diesel hybrid systems are scheduled to be installed in the outer islands by mid-2017.

=== Niue ===
Renewable electricity generation grew 2.5% in 2013 to 9% in 2016.

=== Samoa ===
Between 2013 and 2016, renewable generation capacity grew from 7.5 MW to 15.4 MW, mostly due to solar energy systems, but also due to two wind turbines. Apolima became the first 100% renewable Pacific island.

=== Tokelau ===
Almost 100% of renewable generation is due to solar PV systems.

=== Tonga ===
In 2000, 75% of Tonga's energy came from petroleum imports, with biomass and photovoltaic systems accounting for the remainder. In April 2009, the government of Tonga sought to reduce this costly petroleum dependency by developing a plan, subsequently called the Tonga Energy Road Map 2010 – 2020 (TERM).

Renewable electricity generation is expected to grow from 5.4% in 2013 to 13% in 2018.

== See also ==
- Energy law
- Renewable energy by country
