= Paepaeala =

Coordinates: 13°50′26.58″S 172°2′30.1″W

Paepaeala is a village on the island of Upolu in Samoa. It is situated on the north west coast of the island in the political district of Aiga-i-le-Tai.

The population is 162.
