= Lalovi =

Village on the island of Upolu in Samoa

Coordinates: 13°51′9.92″S 172°3′29.15″W

Lalovi is a village on the island of Upolu in Samoa. It is situated on the north west coast of the island in the political district of Aiga-i-le-Tai.

The population is 504.
