= Samea (Samoa) =

Village on the island of Upolu, Samoa

Coordinates: 13°50′18.66″S 172°2′29.66″W

Samea is a village on the island of Upolu in Samoa. It is situated on the north west coast of the island in the political district of Aiga-i-le-Tai.

The population is 146.
