= Salelologa =

- Township & Ferry Terminal
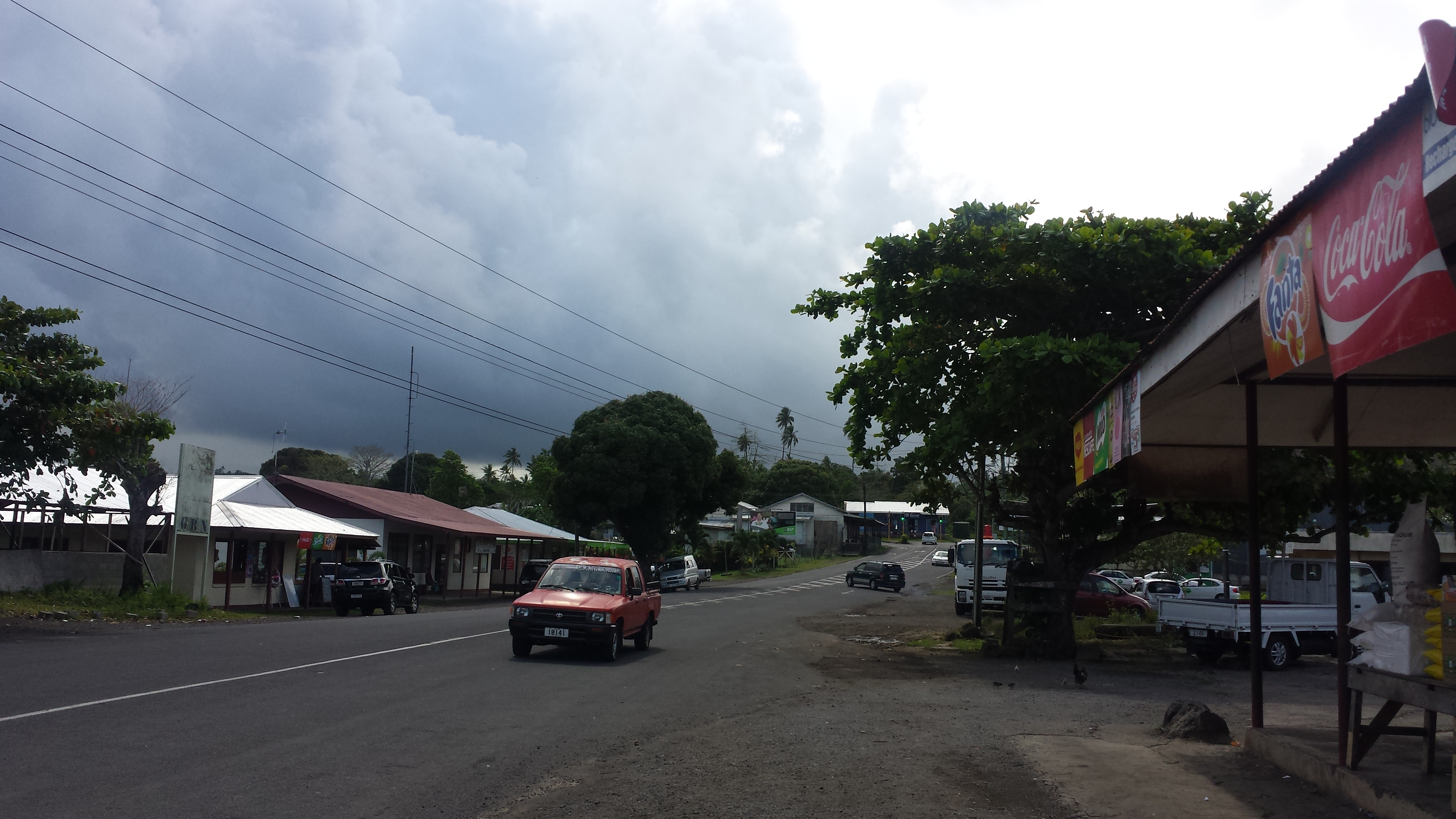
- Road flanked with shops in Salelologa
- Interactive map of Salelologa
- Location within Samoa Location within Pacific Ocean
- Coordinates: 13°44′16″S 172°13′14″W
- Country: Samoa
- District: Fa'asaleleaga
- Time zone: +13

Salelologa (Samoan pronunciation: [ˈsaleloloŋa]) is a village district at the east end of Savai'i island in Samoa. It is the main entry point into the island with the only ferry terminal on Savai'i. It also serves as the main township for shopping and public amenities with a market selling fresh produce and arts and crafts.

Salelologa is made up of smaller sub-villages pito nu'u and falls within the electoral district of Fa'asaleleaga.

== Township ==
The township consists of one main shopping street. Fresh fish, locally grown produce and arts and crafts are sold at the Salelologa Market (makeki) which was recently moved to a new site by the wharf in 2009. The market is open six days a week, Monday to Saturday. Most shops and markets in Samoa close on Sundays with a few small outlets opening in the late afternoon. There are also several small supermarkets, a wholesaler, petrol stations, bakeries such as Retzlaff's bakery, budget hotels and accommodation, as well as public amenities such as internet access, banks and Western Union money transfer outlets.

== Transport ==
The main island highway which reaches most parts of Savai'i is tar-sealed and well maintained. Salelologa is the only township on Savai'i and is the main destination for arrivals and departures for local public transport and visitors to the island.

=== Ferry terminal ===
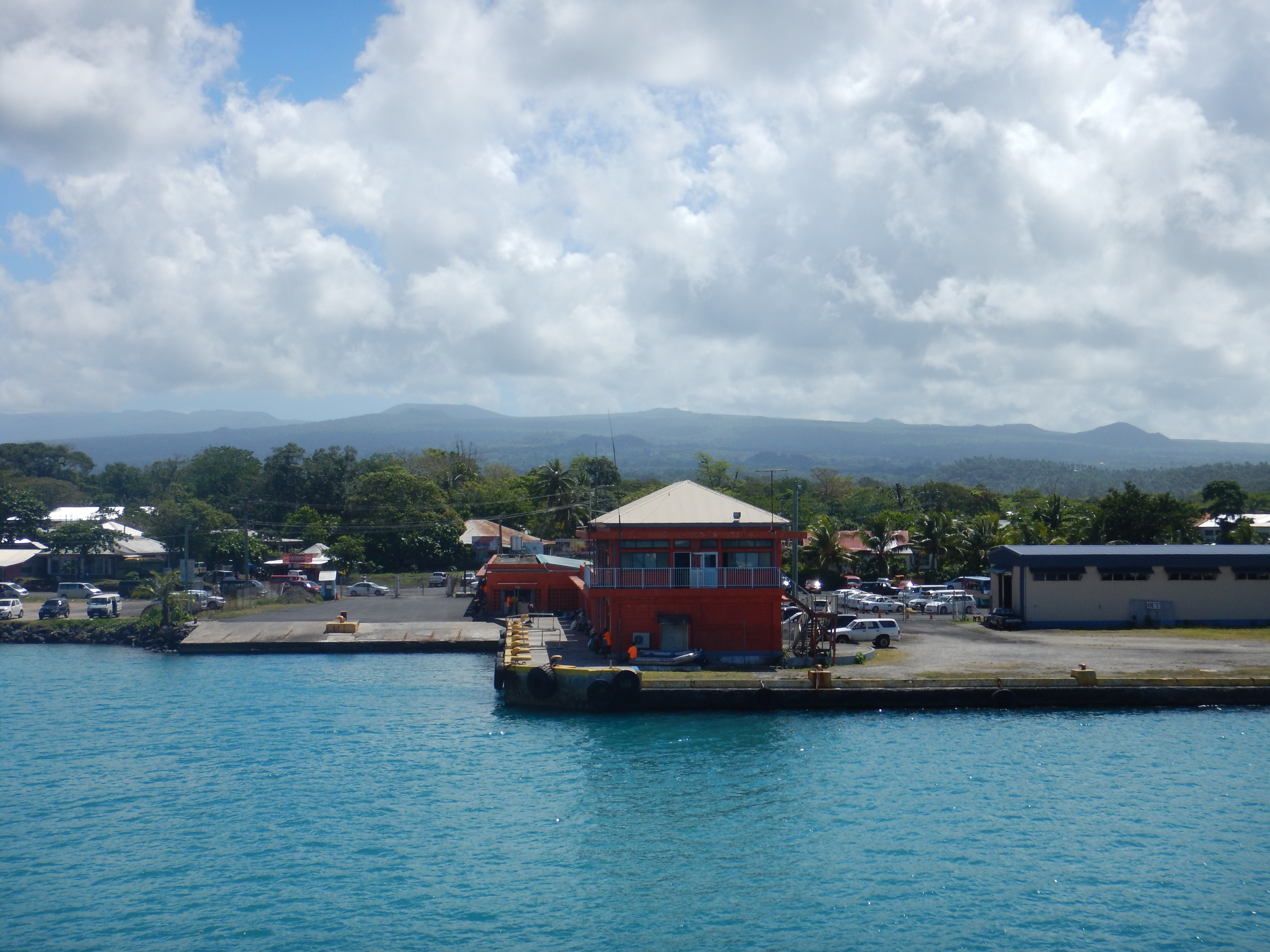
The wharf and ferry terminal as seen from an approaching ferry.

Salelologa wharf is the main port of entry into the island and is the only ferry terminal on Savai'i. The inter-island passenger and vehicle ferries operate in the Apolima Strait between Salelologa and Mulifanua wharf at the north west corner of Upolu. The ferries are managed by the government and operate seven days a week during the day. Ferry arrivals and departures are usually every two hours. A one-way trip takes about 90 minutes with views of Apolima and Manono islands to the south during the crossing.

=== Maota Airport ===
Maota Airport is an airstrip 10 minutes south of Salelologa. Most flights operate between Faleolo International Airport on Upolu; however, the service can be sporadic.

=== Local transport ===
There are buses, taxis and rental car companies at the ferry terminal and in the township. The bus route is via the main highway which generally follows the coastline of the island where most villages and settlements are situated. The buses are usually scheduled around the ferry arrivals and departures with short stops at the market and shops before heading out of town. There are no 'bus stop' signs on Savai'i and catching a bus involves standing by the side of the road or signalling with a wave at the driver. Local buses are the cheapest form of transport on the island, although they can fill very quickly at the ferry terminal. There are plenty of taxis at the wharf and around the township during the day. Rental cars are available on Savai'i, although prior bookings are essential.

== Public library ==
Savai'i Public Library, the only public library on the island, is situated in Salelologa by the old market. It is sometimes referred to as Salelologa Library. It is the only branch of Samoa's central Nelson Memorial Public Library in the capital Apia on Upolu island.

== Climate ==
Climate data for Salelologa
Month	Jan	Feb	Mar	Apr	May	Jun	Jul	Aug	Sep	Oct	Nov	Dec	Year
Mean daily maximum °C (°F)	30.1 (86.2)	28.9 (84.0)	29.9 (85.8)	30.4 (86.7)	29.0 (84.2)	29.1 (84.4)	28.8 (83.8)	29.1 (84.4)	29.0 (84.2)	28.7 (83.7)	30.2 (86.4)	30.1 (86.2)	29.4 (85.0)
Mean daily minimum °C (°F)	24.3 (75.7)	23.9 (75.0)	23.1 (73.6)	24.3 (75.7)	23.0 (73.4)	23.4 (74.1)	22.9 (73.2)	24.4 (75.9)	23.0 (73.4)	24.1 (75.4)	23.5 (74.3)	23.1 (73.6)	23.6 (74.4)
Average precipitation mm (inches)	410 (16.13)	330 (13.01)	392 (15.45)	232 (9.12)	174 (6.86)	193 (7.59)	140 (5.53)	150 (5.92)	186 (7.32)	264 (10.41)	280 (11.04)	379 (14.91)	3,130 (123.29)
Average precipitation days (≥ 0.1in)	22.9	18.6	18.4	14.1	12.6	7.9	9.7	9.9	11.1	14.9	16.1	18.0	174.2

== Gallery ==
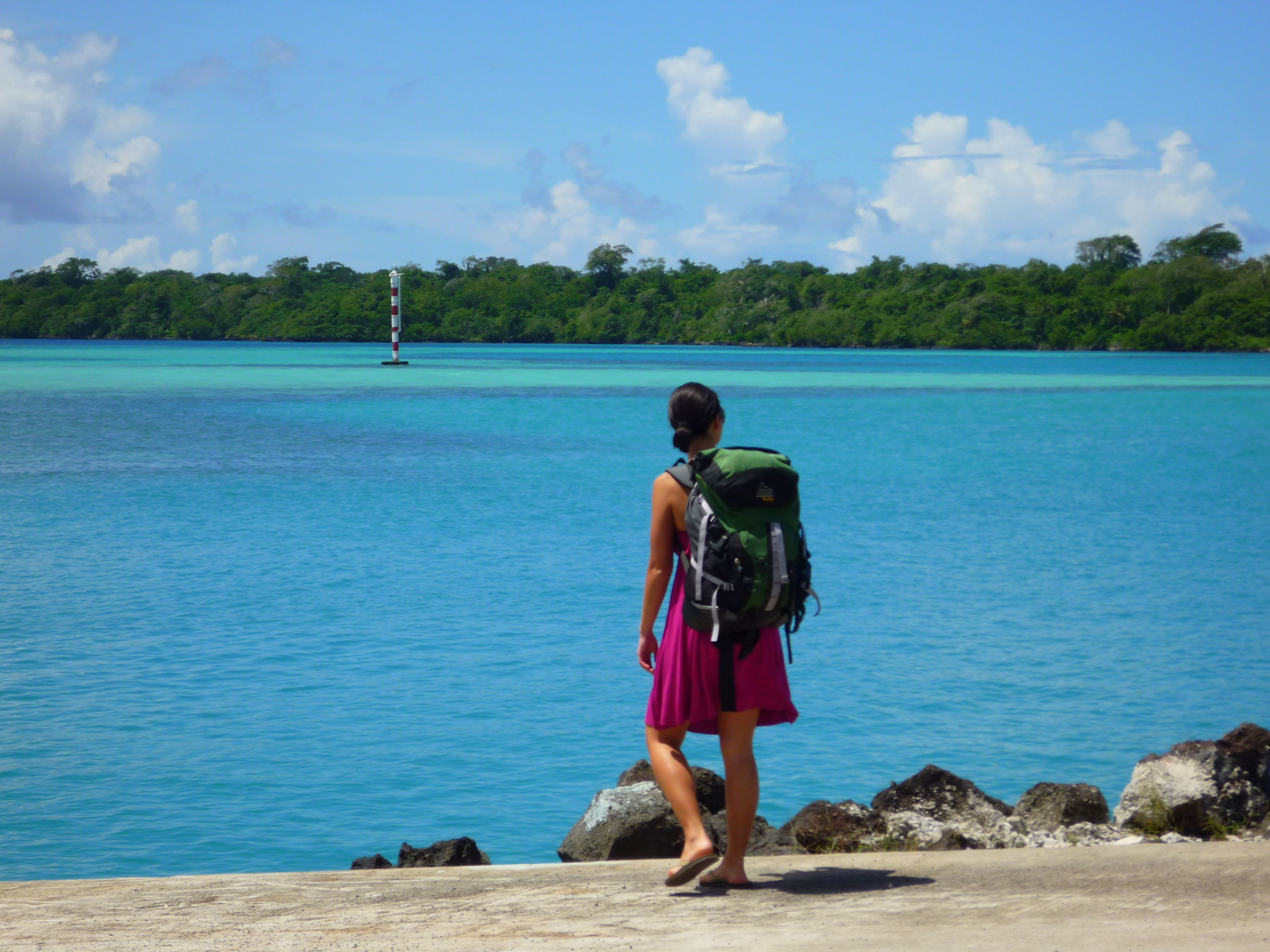
View from the wharf looking south.

Salelologa market at dawn.

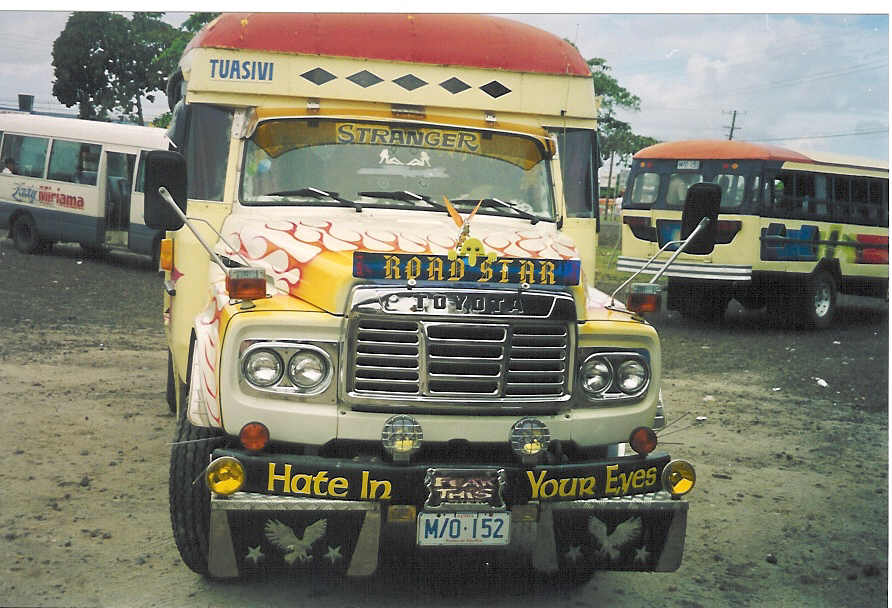
Local bus on the island.

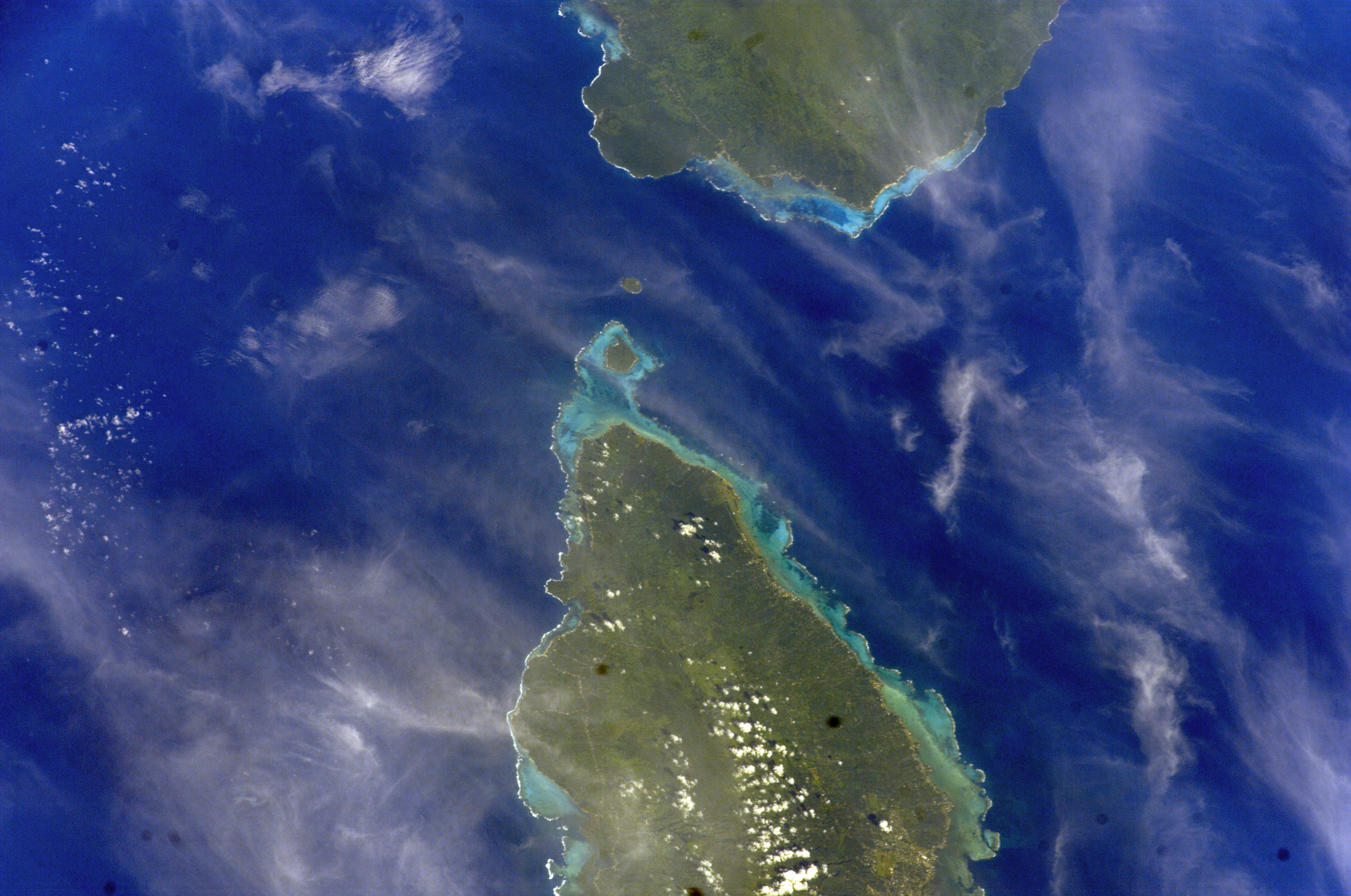
NASA Satellite image with Savai'i (top) and Upolu (bottom) with Apolima and Manono islands between them.

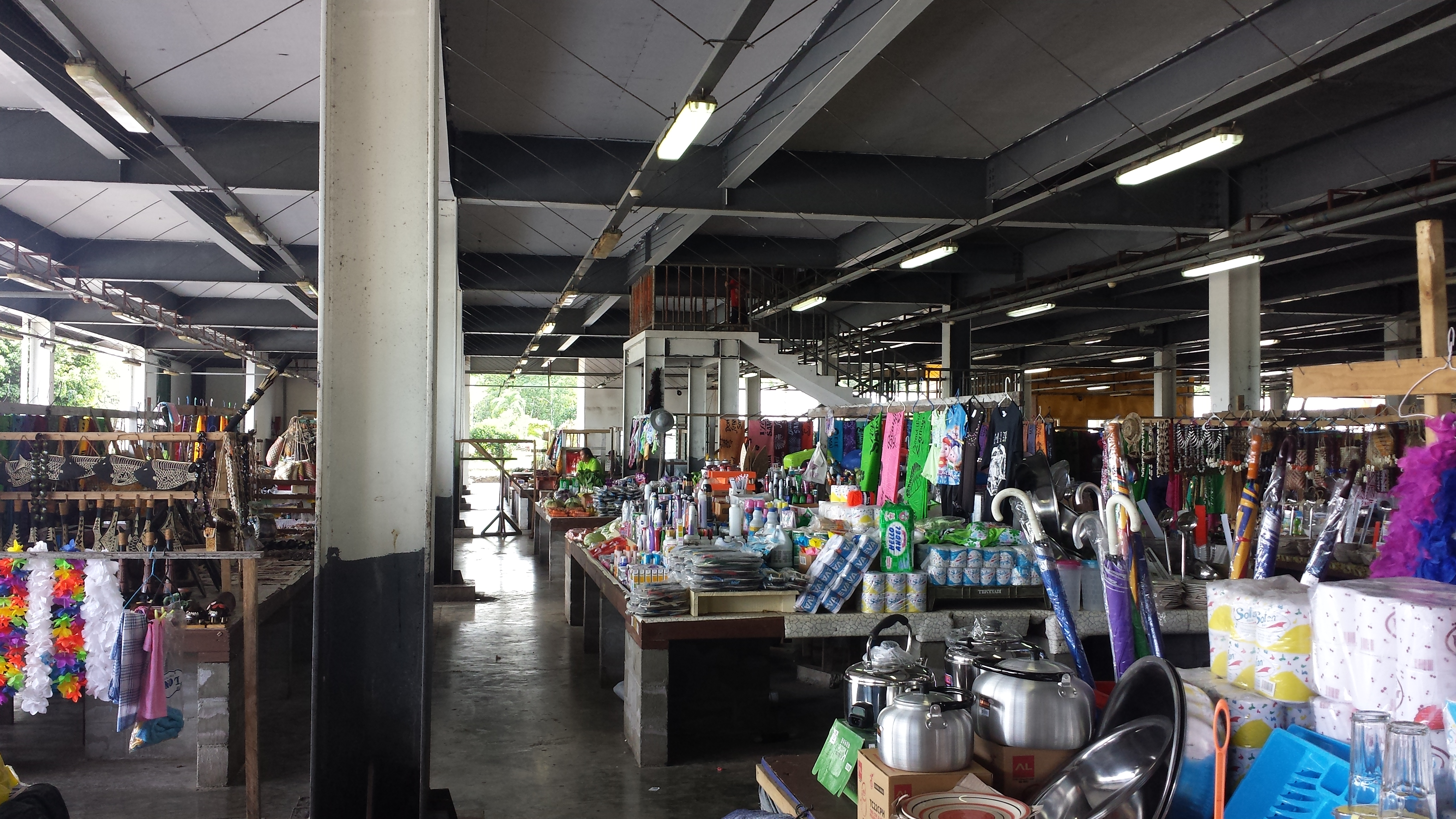
Salelologa market.

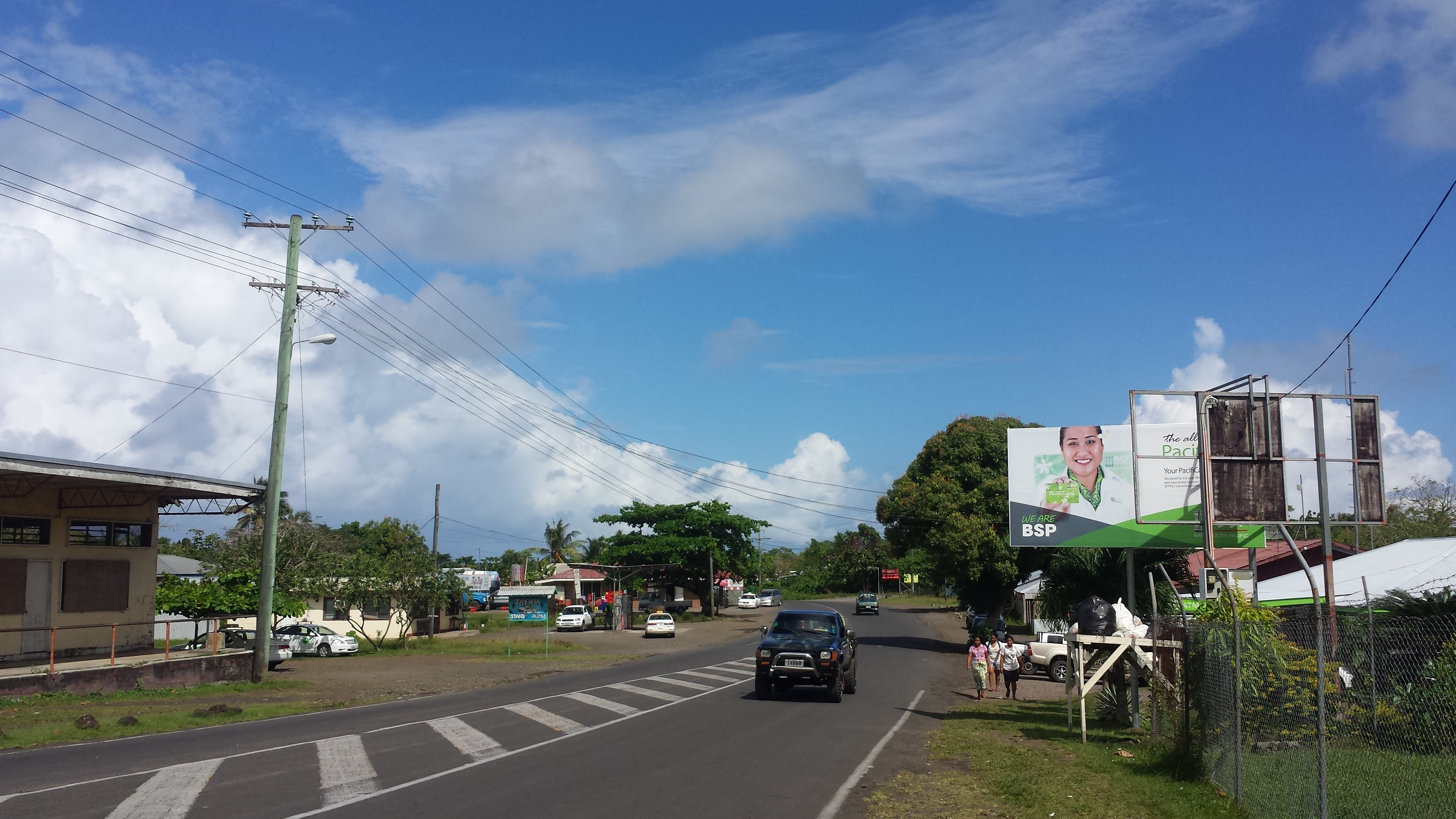
Road in Salelologa

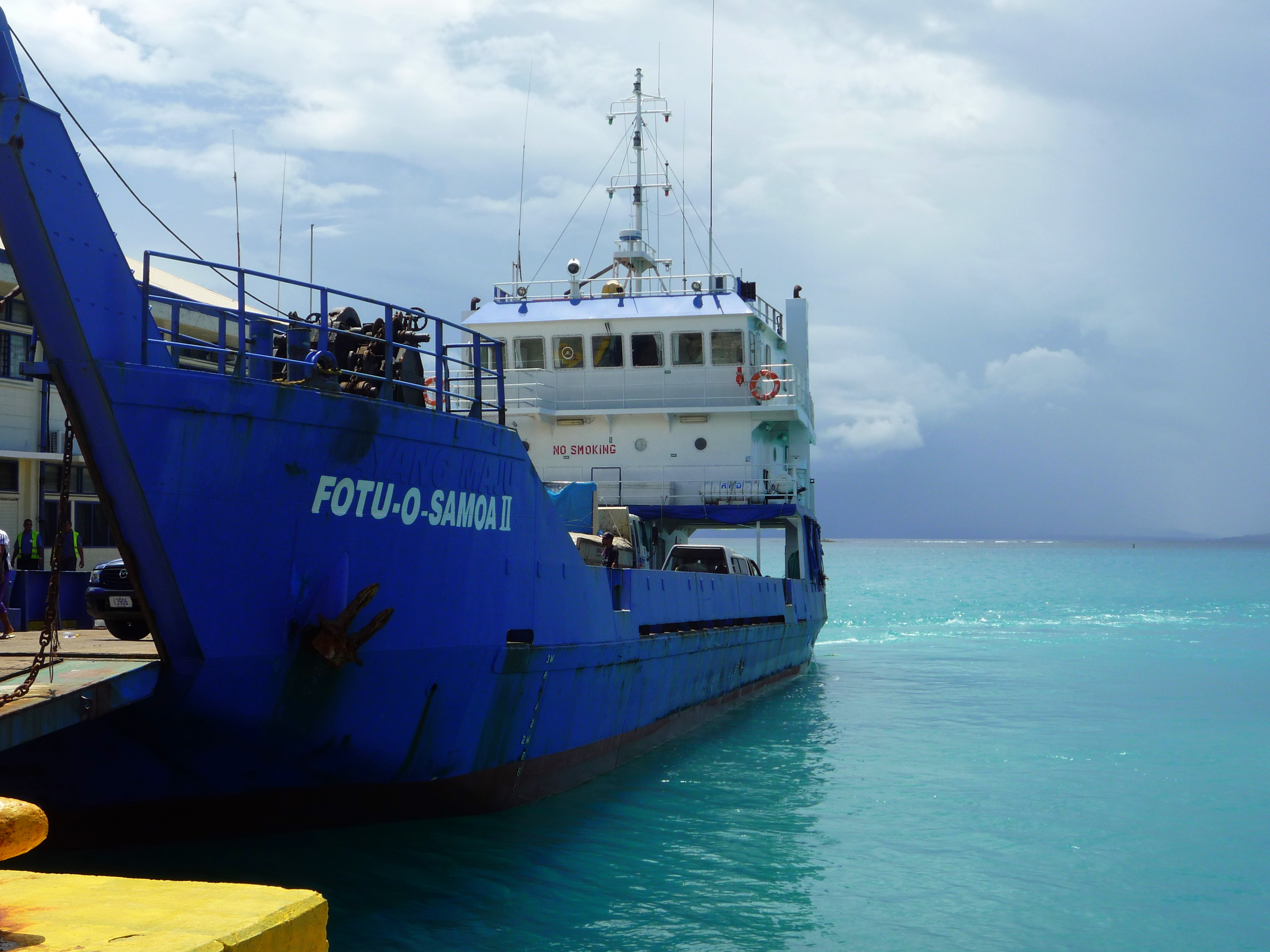
Fotu o Samoa II ferry at Salelologa wharf.

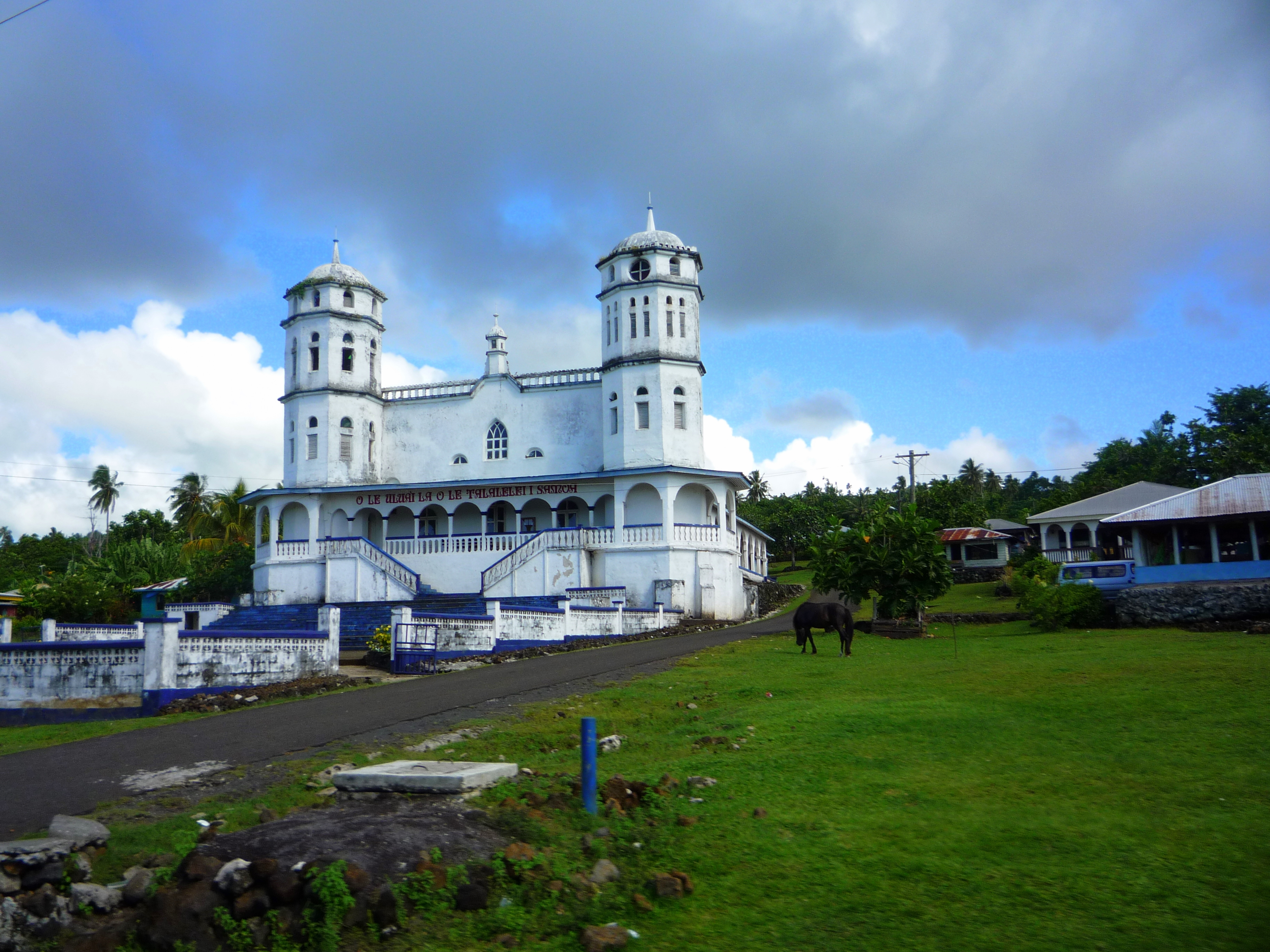
Church in Salelologa

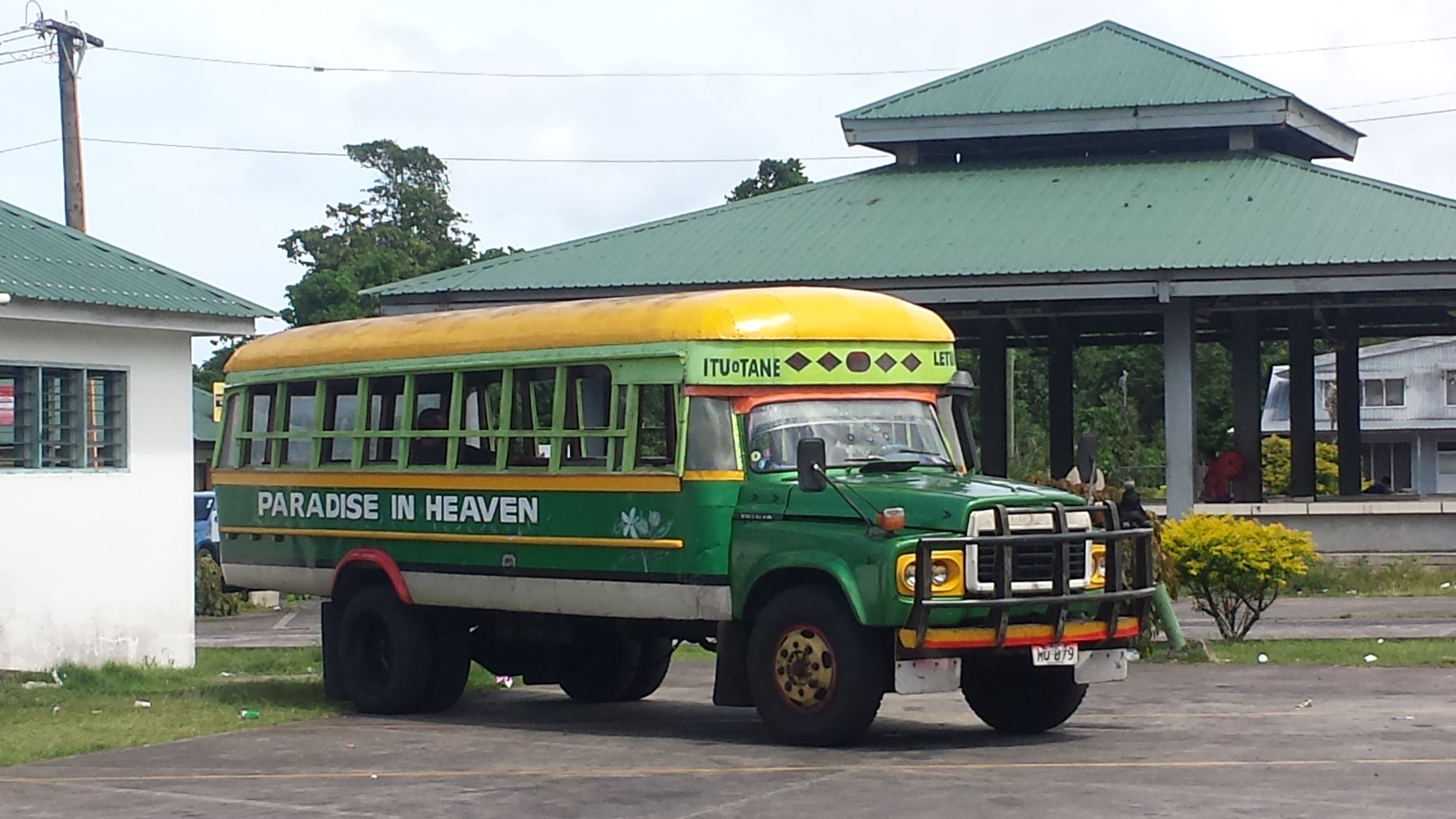
A bus at the Salelologa market
