= Samoa Public Library =

Library in Apia, Samoa

Coordinates: 13°49′48.44″S 171°46′8.41″W

The Samoa Public Library, also known as the Nelson Memorial Public Library, is the main public library in Samoa.

It is in the capital Apia on the island of Upolu and is sometimes referred to as Apia Library.

Library services in Samoa are administered by the Ministry of Education, Sports and Culture.

== History ==
The library was set up in 1956 with the current building on Beach Road officially opened in 1960. Funding for the building was received from the Samoa government, New Zealand and the family of patriot, Mau leader and businessman Olaf Frederick Nelson. The library is named in Nelson's honour.

== Savai'i branch ==
Savai'i Public Library is the only branch of the central library, in Salelologa on the island of Savai'i.
