= Eastern Frontier Rifles =

- Coat of arms of Eastern Frontier Rifles
- Active: 1795–present
- Country: East India Company (British Raj) British India (1873-1947) India
- Allegiance: India
- Branch: West Bengal Police
- Type: Paramilitary
- Size: 3300
- Part of: EFR HQ; 3 Battalions
- Garrison/HQ: Salua, Kharagpur, West Midnapore, West Bengal
- Nickname: EFR
- Mottos: "Wafadari Aur Bahaduri"; Loyalty and Bravery
- Equipment: AK47
- Engagements: World War I World War II; Indo-Pakistani War of 1965; Bangladesh Liberation War; Naxalite Movement

The Eastern Frontier Rifles (EFR) was a former Para Military Force before Independence and now is a State Armed Police Force for the Indian state of West Bengal. They are a part of the West Bengal Police. The Border Guards Bangladesh traces its origins to the Eastern Frontier Rifles units allocated to Pakistan during the partitioning of 1947.

The Eastern Frontier Rifles were founded as the "Frontier Protection Force" by the East India Company in the second half of the eighteenth century, and have held their current title since 1920. The Eastern Frontier Rifles fought in the First World War (as the Bengal Military Police) and also in the Second World War.

== History ==
- 18th century: Founded as Frontier Protection Force.
- 1795: Renamed Ramgarh Local Battalion.
- 1861: Renamed Frontier Guards.
- 1891: Renamed Bengal Military Police, modernised, and given up-to-date weaponry. An unrelated unit, the 45th Sikhs, had previously used this same title.
- 1920: Re-organised and renamed Eastern Frontier Rifles.
- 1947: Split between the Indian state of West Bengal and East Pakistan. The former retained the unit's original title, and the latter was renamed to 'East Pakistan Rifles' (later Bangladesh Rifles, and then Border Guard Bangladesh)

=== Pre-Indian Independence ===
On 1 February 1910, the Silchar and Garo Hills Battalions were amalgamated with the Dacca Battalion. Later that year, a detachment of 100 men was raised at Barisal, and the force was reorganized into a full battalion headquartered at Dacca, with detachments stationed at Tura, Silchar, and Barisal.

In 1911, the battalion participated for the first time in military operations in the Mishmi Mission. In 1913, a detachment of the battalion took part in an expedition to the Naga Hills. During the capture of Chenglong on 5 February 2013, the baggage guard was attacked, resulting in three sepoys killed and three seriously wounded. For both of these engagements, the battalion's conduct earned commendations from Viceroy Charles Hardinge, 1st Baron Hardinge of Penshurst, Inspector-General of Police Mr. Hughes Buller, and the Governor of Bengal Thomas David Gibson-Carmichael, 1st Baron Carmichael.

A battalion school was also established at headquarters with a full-time instructor. With the repartition of Eastern Bengal and Assam in 1912, the battalion underwent further reorganization. The Silchar and Garo Hills detachment were transferred to the Assam Government on 1 November 1912, reducing the battalion strength, and it became the 1st Bengal Military Police Battalion.

Two detachment camps were set up at Buxadar and Hoogly in 1914 with two new companies commissioned. The Battalion force was detailed for Law and Order duty during the Komaghata Maru Sikhs Riots at Howrah and did excellent work in rounding up the rioters, earning the thanks of the Governments of Punjab and Bengal.

A report of the Police Administration in the Bengal Presidency stated:

"Good accounts have been received of the contingent serving with the Mesopotamia Expedition force where a Lance Naik Poli Ram has recently had been awarded the I.O.M. The Bengal Military Police furnished reinforcements for the regular Army at that time of National emergency. The officer and men so lent to the Army have been conspicuous for their soldierly gallant conduct in the field and their behaviour while serving in the regular army troops in the field has left nothing to be desired."

In 1920, the Bengal Military Police was renamed the Eastern Frontier Rifles (EFR) in recognition of its wartime service. The same year, the Eastern Frontier Rifles (Bengal Battalion) Act was enacted, followed by regulations in 1922. The battalion adopted the platoon system in 1921 and received web equipment in 1923. During the Chittagong Armoury Raid, EFR detachments were deployed to Chittagong and engaged the raiders on 22 April 1930, recovering arms and ammunition and inflicting casualties.

In 1938, a platoon was deployed to Rampore, Orissa, for riot control, internal security, prisoner guarding, and wartime support alongside the Indian Army. A St. John Ambulance Division was established in December 1941. The battalion moved from Dacca to Hijli in 1947 and was relocated to Salua, Midnapur, in 1951, where the Eastern Frontier Rifles remain stationed today.

=== Post-independence ===
Before 1956, the Eastern Frontier Rifles were primarily employed in controlling communal disturbances and border skirmishes in West Bengal. In 1956, the force was deployed to Manipur and the Naga Hills to help suppress the Naga insurgency and later operated alongside the Indian Army. The EFR served in difficult conditions, suffering four fatalities before being withdrawn following the Army's expanded deployment in 1961.

Beside their deployment to the Naga Hills, the Eastern Frontier Rifles had performed as border security duties as well. Most of the border with East Pakistan (now Bangladesh) was unmanned and therefore porous. Border rules and regulations were also constantly under review and thus there were occasional boundary skirmishes. In 1950, they engaged Pakistani forces in a week-long exchange of fire at Dhatupara, Nadia District, suffering two fatalities. EFR lost 1 Naik and 1 rifleman. With the taking over of the border by the Border Security Force, the Eastern Frontier Rifles was withdrawn from the Indo-Pak Border.

During the 1962 war with China, the question of internal security came to the fore and once again attention went towards the Eastern Frontier Rifles and the 2nd Battalion, which is also stationed in Salua, was deployed to keep the peace in the state.

During the India–Pakistan war of 1971, the Eastern Frontier Rifles clashed with the East Pakistan Rifles (EPR) in Bengal's Nadia district.

In June 1982, the services of four companies of EFR battalions were placed at the disposal of the Bihar Government to remain as a Reserve Force during the General Assembly Election of Bihar.

On 15 February 2010, 100 armed Maoists conducted a daring daylight attack on the EFR camp in Silda. Taking cover of civilian crowds, and that the EFR troopers were completely unprepared, the Maoists surrounded the camp and opened fire with grenades and automatic weapons, killing 24 EFR troopers. The camp was completely gutted and the Maoists also looted guns and mortars.

In January 2025, representatives of EFR informed the Darjeeling MP Raju Bista that no fresh recruitment had taken place since 2010, even though there were 2000 vacancies. As a result, force numbers had dropped and the West Bengal government planned to merge the three battalions into two. Raju Bista said it was deeply concerning that the state government was trying to kill the historic force which had served the nation with exemplary honour in a number of conflicts and internal security assignments.

In June 2026, the newly elected Chief Minister of West Bengal Suvendu Adhikari announced that EFR would be revived, and 1000 Gorkha Youths would be recruited.

== Awards and honours ==
On 15 October 1911 Subedar Major Gopal Chandra with two havildars and ten sepoys attended the Delhi Darbar to receive medals. 20 Abor Medals were given to the men who had been engaged in operations under the command of Major General Bower. Subedar Major Gopal Chandra Das received the Order of the British India conferred on him in December 1912 and in the same year Subedar Kharag Singh received the King's Police Medal for long and meritorious service.

In 1914, in recognition of good work done in the Naga Hills expeditions, the King's Police Medal was awarded to Captain E.D. Dallas Smith, Lance Naik Mohan Chandra, Sepoy Dhanjoi Ram and Havildar Dhaga Ram.

In 1917, Lance Naik Pholi Ram was awarded I.O.M. Second Class while serving in the Indian Army at Mesopotamia. Owing to the excellent work done by Shri P.C. Dutta, Head Clerk, EFR Battalion, in the interest of the battalion since it was formed and on the recommendation of the Commandant, the title of "Raisaheb" was conferred on him in the Birthday Honours List 1922. Subedar Major Daga Ram Kachari was made a "Sardar Bahadur" in January 1925, for his good services. Sardar Bahadur Subedar Major Ganesh Bahadur Chhetri was made a member of the Order of the British Empire in the Birthday Honours List 1931. In 1939, the title of "Sardar Bahadur" was conferred on Subedar Major Bistu Ram in the New Years Honours List. Major Weleb, Assistant Commandant, and Subedar Harka Bahadur Lama received the Indian Police Medal in 1939.

The Indian Police Medal was also awarded to the following personnel after independence:

- Subedar Major Ran. Bah. Subba for Meritorious Service in 1959.
- Subedar Major Dwip Bahadur Chhetri for Meritorious Service.
- Subedar Rama Kanta Kachari — Gallantry Medal in 1950.
- Subedar Ashutosh Kachari for Meritorious Service in 1965.
- Subedar Sukman Thapa for Meritorious Service in 1969.
- Late Rifleman Til Bahadur Tamang — Gallantry Medal in 1976.
- Late Lance Naik Bhaktah Bahadur Rai — Gallantry Medal in 1976.
- Subedar Major Tikendra Ch. Kachari — Meritorious Services in 1981.

== The Eastern Frontier Rifles Band ==
Buglers were appointed in 1907 in the Dacca Battalion of the Eastern Bengal and Assam Military Police, later renamed the EFR Battalion, forming part of its band party. Gurkha soldiers, including discharged sepoys, were recruited in 1909 and 1920, with one serving as a bugler. In 1912, the battalion received six bagpipes from Lieutenant-Governor Charles Bayley in recognition of its service.

The band of the EFR 1st Battalion, known as the State Band of the Government of West Bengal, performs at police parades, Republic Day events, Raj Bhavan ceremonies, and other state functions. It has also performed for visiting foreign dignitaries, including heads of state and government from multiple countries, and is regularly invited to enhance official state occasions in West Bengal.

== Achievements in sporting events ==
Ex. Sub. Surbir Gurung of this battalion represented West Bengal in the All India Championship Shooting Competition in 1958 and National Championship Shooting Competition in 1959 held at Calcutta, New Delhi and Bangalore, respectively and won 1st and 2nd prizes. In sports, EFR personnel are always to be reckoned with: Sub. Major Tiken Ram Kachari and Naik/Sub. Saban Ram Kachari of this battalion are well known figures in hockey who attained national prominence. Naik Bachpan Lohar and Rifleman Anil Rava of the 1st Battalion represented West Bengal for the Agha Khan Gold Cup in 1977. Shri Bir Bahadur Chhetri who represented India in the Olympic hockey tournament in 1976 and 1980 at Montreal and Moscow, respectively, was Lance Naik of this battalion. In 1981 and 1982 this battalion won the H.N. Gupta Memorial Challenge Cup as the best team in inter-district and inter-unit revolver shooting competitions among police teams in West Bengal.
