= Savaiʻi Public Library =

Only public library in Savaiʻi, Samoa

- 13°44′17.84″S 172°13′13.31″W
- Location: Salelologa, Savaiʻi, Samoa
- Type: Public library
- Service area: Savaiʻi

Other information
- Parent organisation: Ministry of Education, Sports and Culture
- Affiliation: Nelson Memorial Public Library

Savaiʻi Public Library is the only public library on the island of Savaiʻi, the largest and westernmost island in Samoa. It is situated by the old market in the township of Salelologa at the eastern end of the island. Savaiʻi Public Library is a branch of Samoa's central public library, the Nelson Memorial Public Library, situated in the capital Apia on Upolu island. Library services in Samoa are administered by the Ministry of Education, Sports and Culture.
