= Satuimalufilufi =

Samoan village

Coordinates: 13°51′24.63″S 172°3′36.43″W

Satuimalufilufi is a village on the island of Upolu in Samoa. It is situated on the north west coast of the island in the political district of Aiga-i-le-Tai.

However, it is an “enclave village” belonging to the neighbouring political district of A’ana.

The population is 747.

Well known persons with links to Satuimalufilufi:

- Royce Hunt - rugby league player / Toa Samoa player.
- Junior Paulo - rugby league player / Toa Samoa Captain.
