= Manono Island =

Island in Western Samoa

Manono
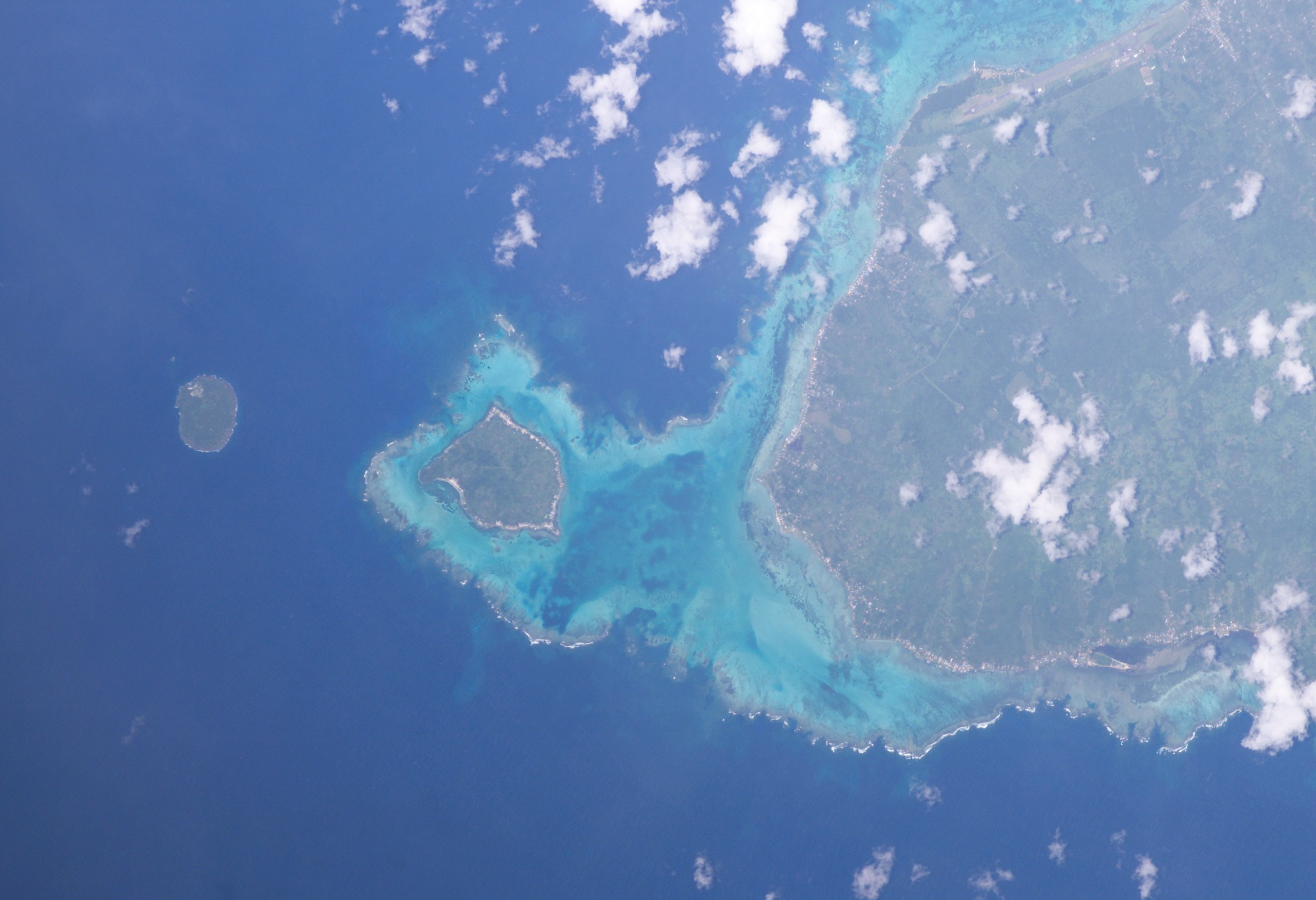
- Satellite image of Manono island with Upolu to the east and tiny Apolima island to the west (NASA photo)

- Location of Manono island in Samoa

Geography
- Location: Pacific Ocean
- Coordinates: 13°50′S 172°05′W
- Area: 3 km^{2} (1.2 sq mi)
- Coastline: 7.5 km (4.66 mi)
- Highest elevation: 60 m (200 ft)

Administration
- Samoa

Demographics
- Population: 889 (2006)
- Pop. density: 296/km^{2} (767/sq mi)

Manono is an island of Samoa, situated in the Apolima Strait between the main islands of Savai'i and Upolu, 3.4 kilometres (2.1 mi) west-northwest off Lefatu Cape, the westernmost point of Upolu. By population, as well as by area, it is Samoa’s third largest island. There are four villages on the island with a total population of 889 (2006 Census).

The island is volcanic in origin, 2.4km long and 1.8km wide, with a maximum elevation of 60m above sea level.

The neighbouring islands are Apolima, which has a small village settlement and the islet Nu'ulopa.

Manono Island is part of the political district Aiga-i-le-Tai. The majority of people in the Aiga-i-le-Tai district live on the 'mainland' at the west end of Upolu island.

== Villages ==
The four villages and their populations on Manono Island are

1. Apai, west (111)
2. Faleu, south (354)
3. Lepuia'i, southwest (223)
4. Salua, north (201)

Out of the four inhabited islands of Samoa, Manono Island has the third largest population, after the much larger islands of Upolu and Savai'i. There are no cars or roads. The main thoroughfare is a footpath that follows the coast. Dogs and horses are banned for environmental reasons. However, dogs were sighted on the island in September 2016. Electricity was only introduced in 1995 and there are several shops with beach fale accommodation for visitors. The boat trip from Upolu island takes about 20 minutes.

In the early 19th century, the island was sometimes called Flat Island, because it consists of a small, flat hill and surrounding low-lying terrain, which is only visible at close approach.

During the 1800s, Manono island was a stronghold for the Methodist church and its early mission in Samoa. At an annual church meeting here on 21 September 1859, a decision was made to establish a training institution on Upolu island which eventually led to the establishment of Piula Theological College in Lufilufi.

== Neighbouring islands ==
The other two islands in the Apolima Strait are Apolima with one small village and the tiny uninhabited island of Nuʻulopa, which is 700 metres (2,300 ft) west-northwest of the northwestern corner of Manono. Nu'ulopa is 37 metres (121 ft) high and about 100 metres (330 ft) in diameter (0.01 square kilometres [0.0039 sq mi]).

== Conservation ==
In December 2006 the Samoan government proposed that the island, as well as neighbouring Apolima and Nuʻulopa, be listed as a World Heritage Site due to its cultural history.

== Gallery ==
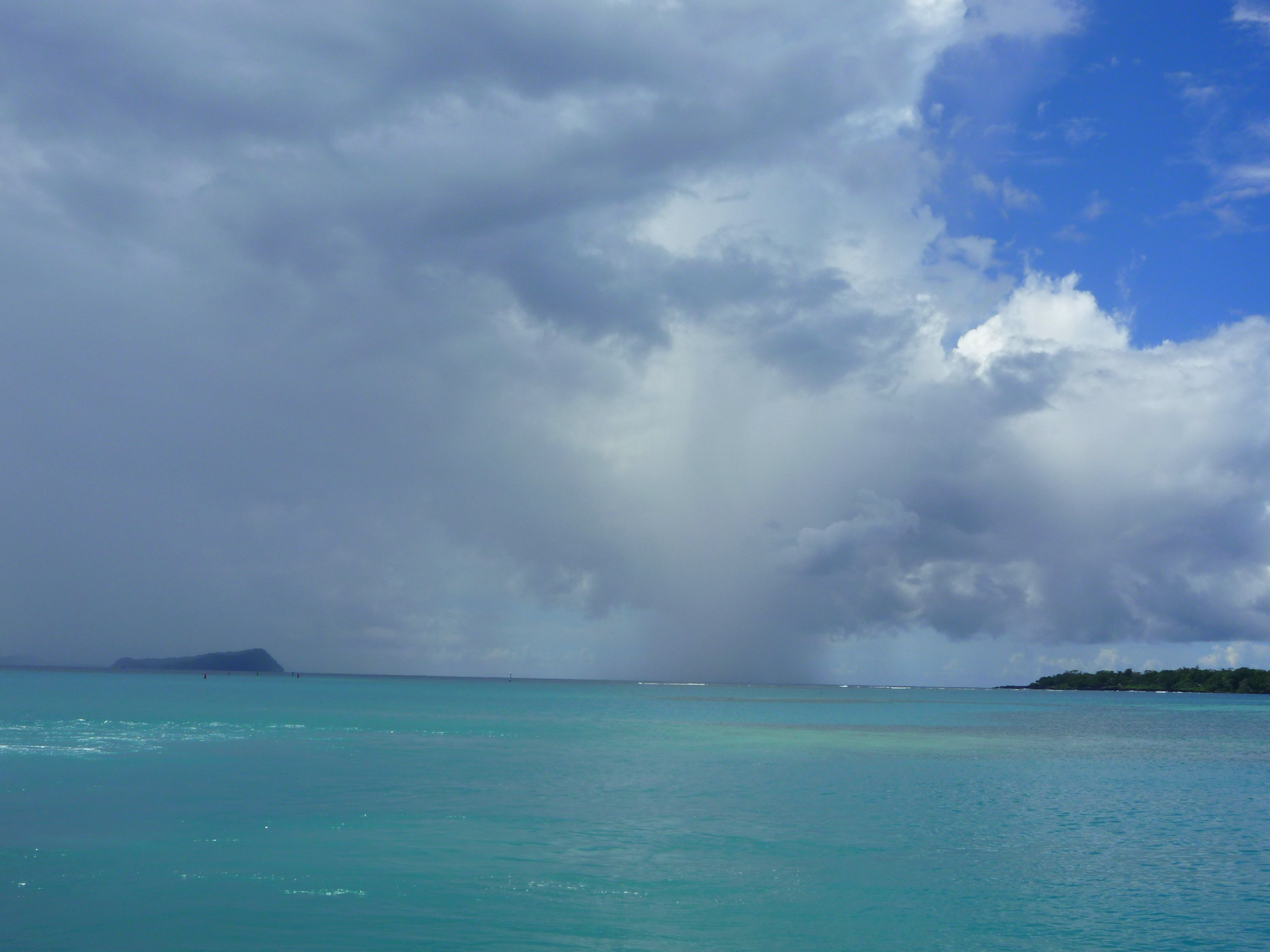
Apolima Strait with Apolima island (left) and the tip of Savai'i (right).

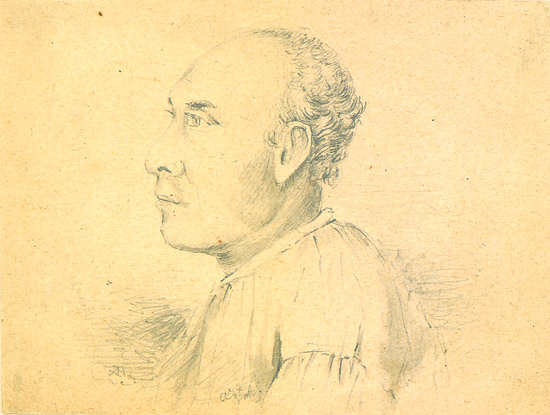
A matai, War Chief Matetau of Manono Island, drawn by Alfred Thomas Agate

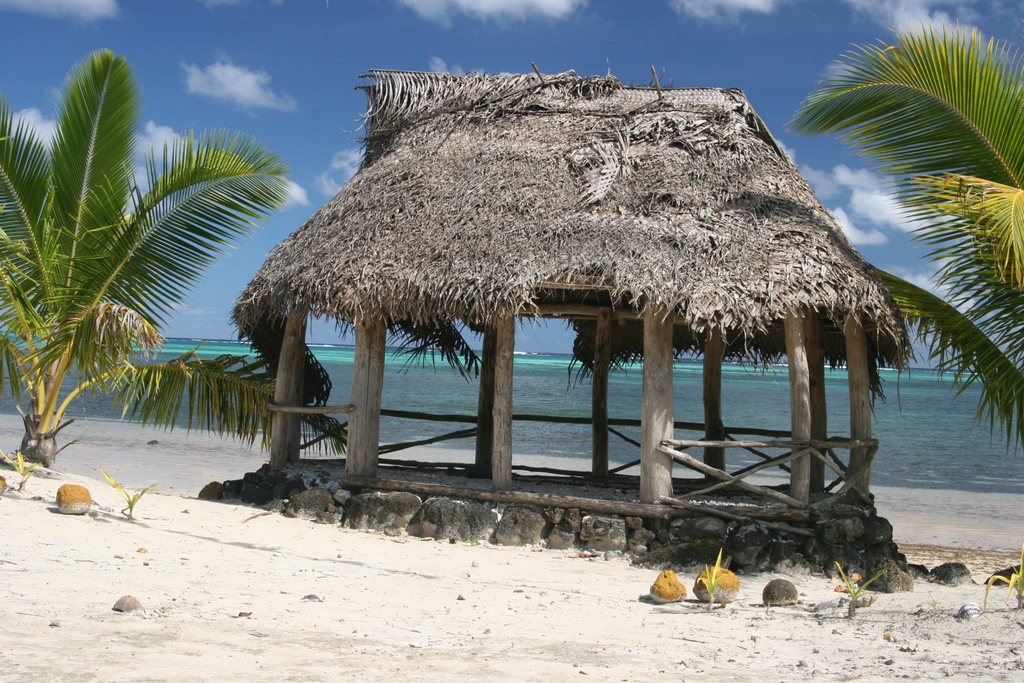
Beach fale (faleo'o) on Manono.

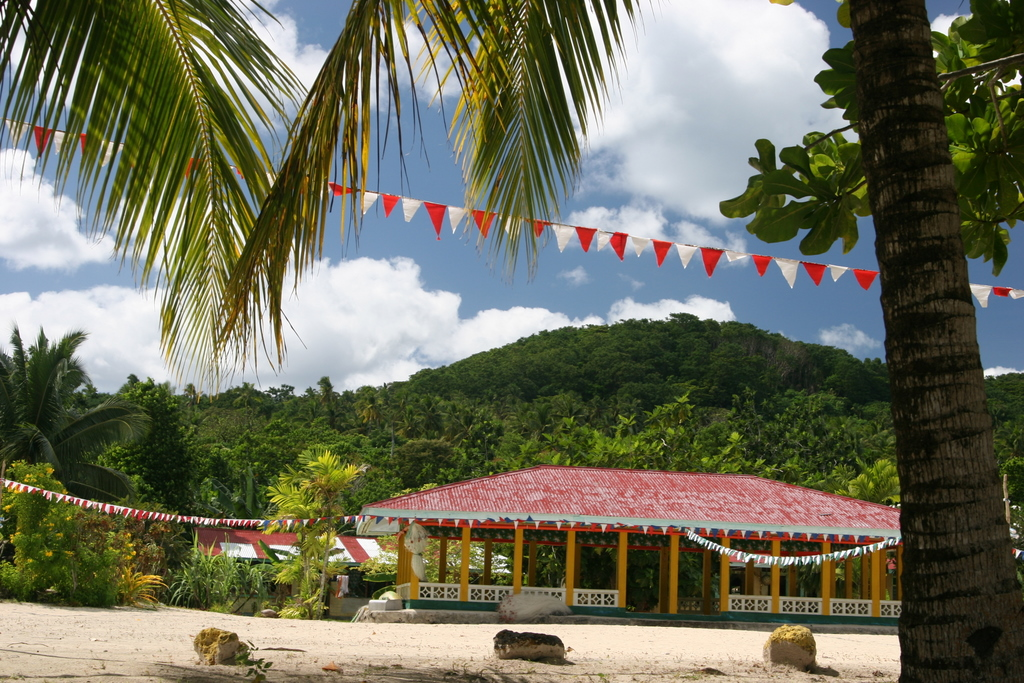
Fale tele meeting house on the island, June 2009

== See also ==
- Archaeology in Samoa
- Samoa Islands
