= Nuʻulopa =

Small island in Aiga-i-le-Tai District, Samoa

- Interactive map of Nuʻulopa

Geography
- Location: Pacific Ocean
- Coordinates: 13.8424°S 172.1293°W
- Area: 0.02 km^{2} (0.0077 sq mi)
- Coastline: 4.19 km (2.604 mi)
- Highest elevation: 50 m (160 ft)

Administration
- Samoa

Nuʻulopa is a small, uninhabited island in the Apolima Strait between the islands of Upolu and Savaiʻi in Samoa, in central South Pacific Ocean. The island is part of the Aiga-i-le-Tai district.

Nuʻulopa is a small, forested, rocky outcrop at the edge of Upolu's fringing reef, and is 6.6km from Upolu. It is 150m wide at its widest point, and has an elevation of 50m. It sits between two other islands, Apolima and Manono. Those three islands lie on an underwater ridge that runs between the two main Samoan islands of Upolu and Savaiʻi.

Nuʻulopa has traditionally been used as a cemetery for the high chiefs (matai) of Manono.

== Ecology ==
The island is home to three species of ground birds: the Polynesian wattled honeyeater, Samoan starling, and Polynesian triller. It is a conservation area for flying foxes, and its surrounding waters are a conservation area for turtles. Plant species present include Calophyllum inophyllum, Terminalia catappa, and Cerbera manghas in coastal areas, and Macaranga harveyana, Hibiscus tiliaceus, Erythrina variegata, and Diospyros samoensis inland.

In December 2006 the Samoan government proposed that the island, as well as neighbouring Manono Island and Apolima, be listed as a World Heritage Site due to its cultural history.

== Gallery ==
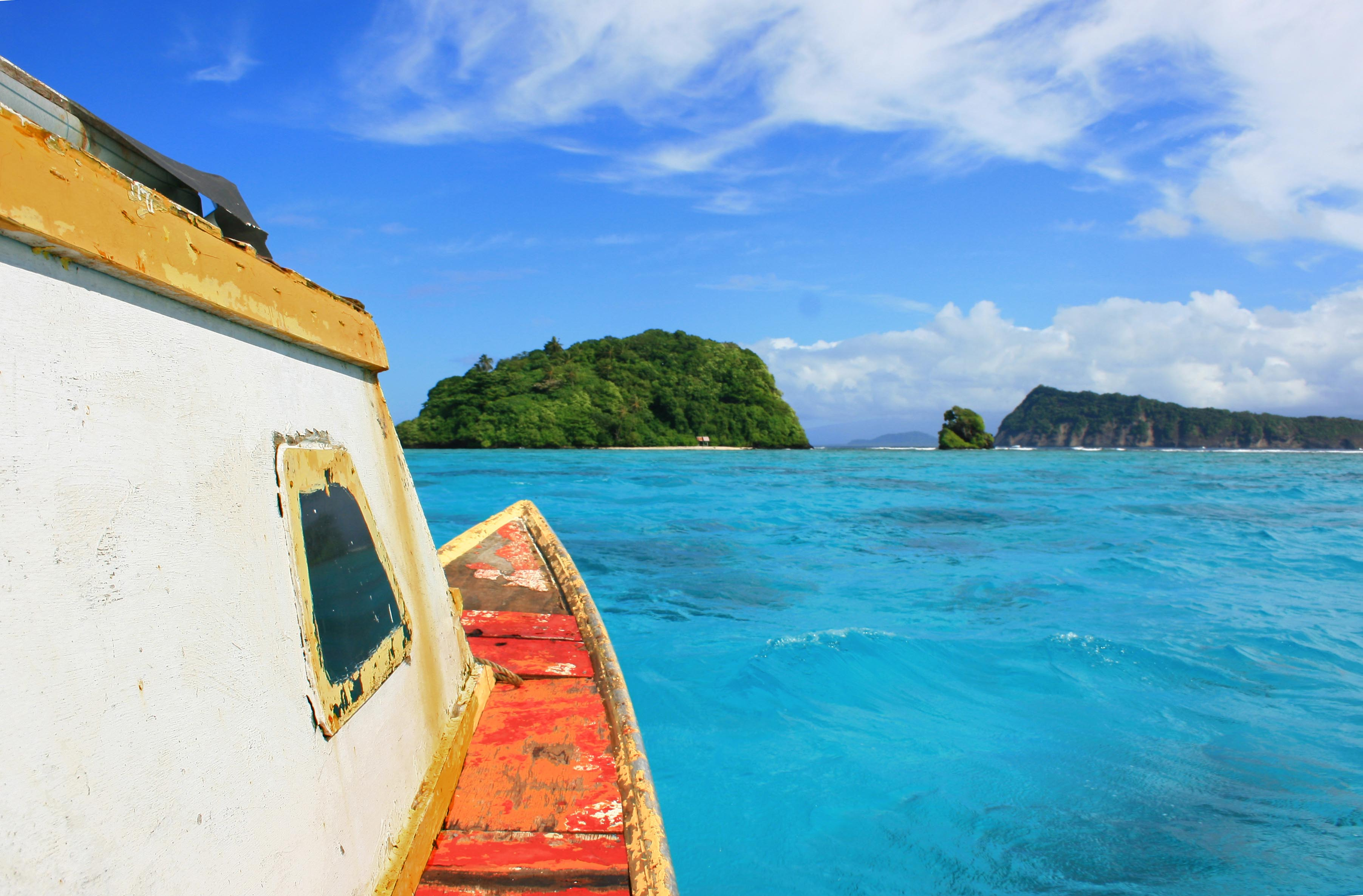
Heading towards Nu'ulopa island in a boat. Apolima Tai village on Apolima island is to the right and Savai'i island in the distance.

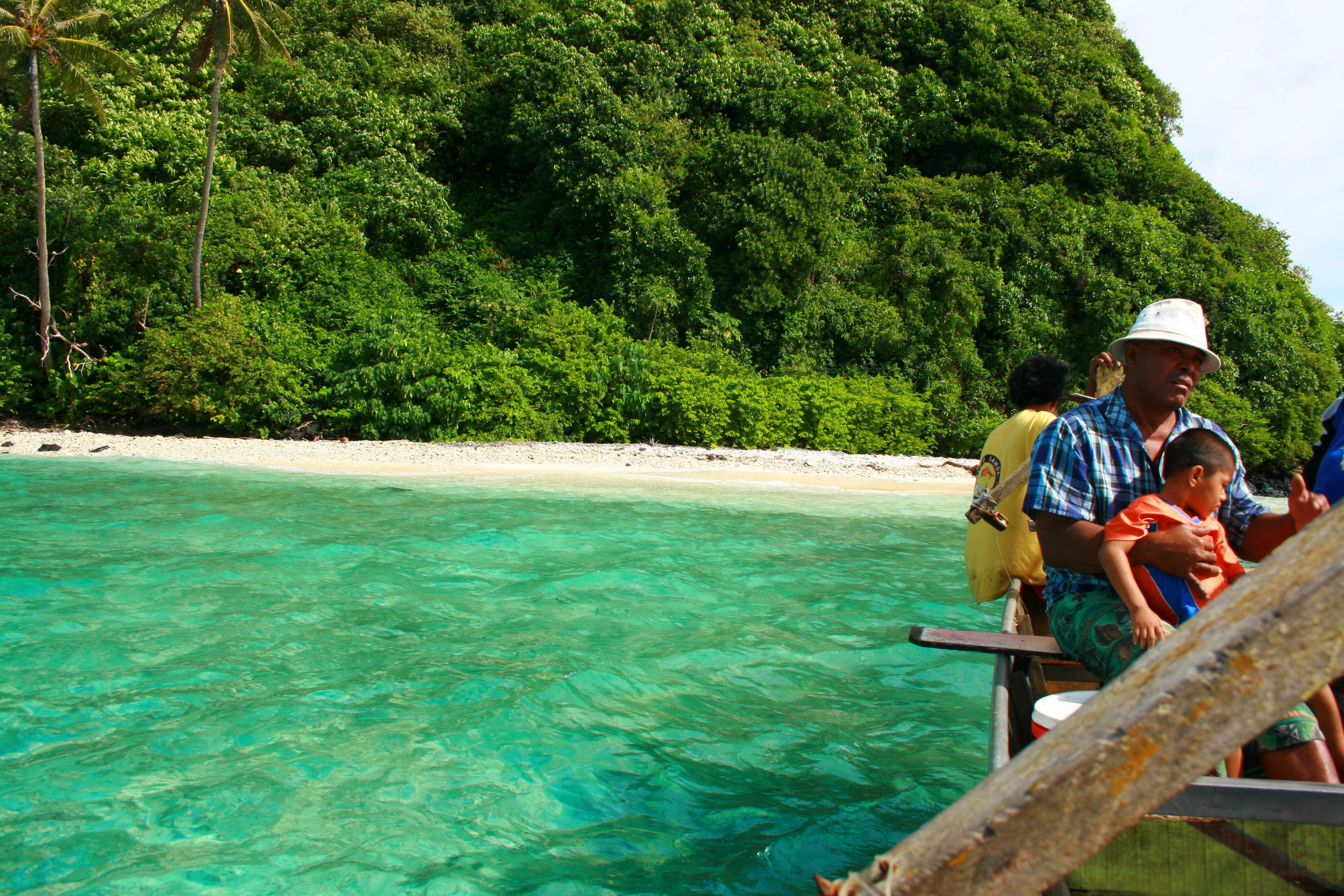
Nearing the island by boat.

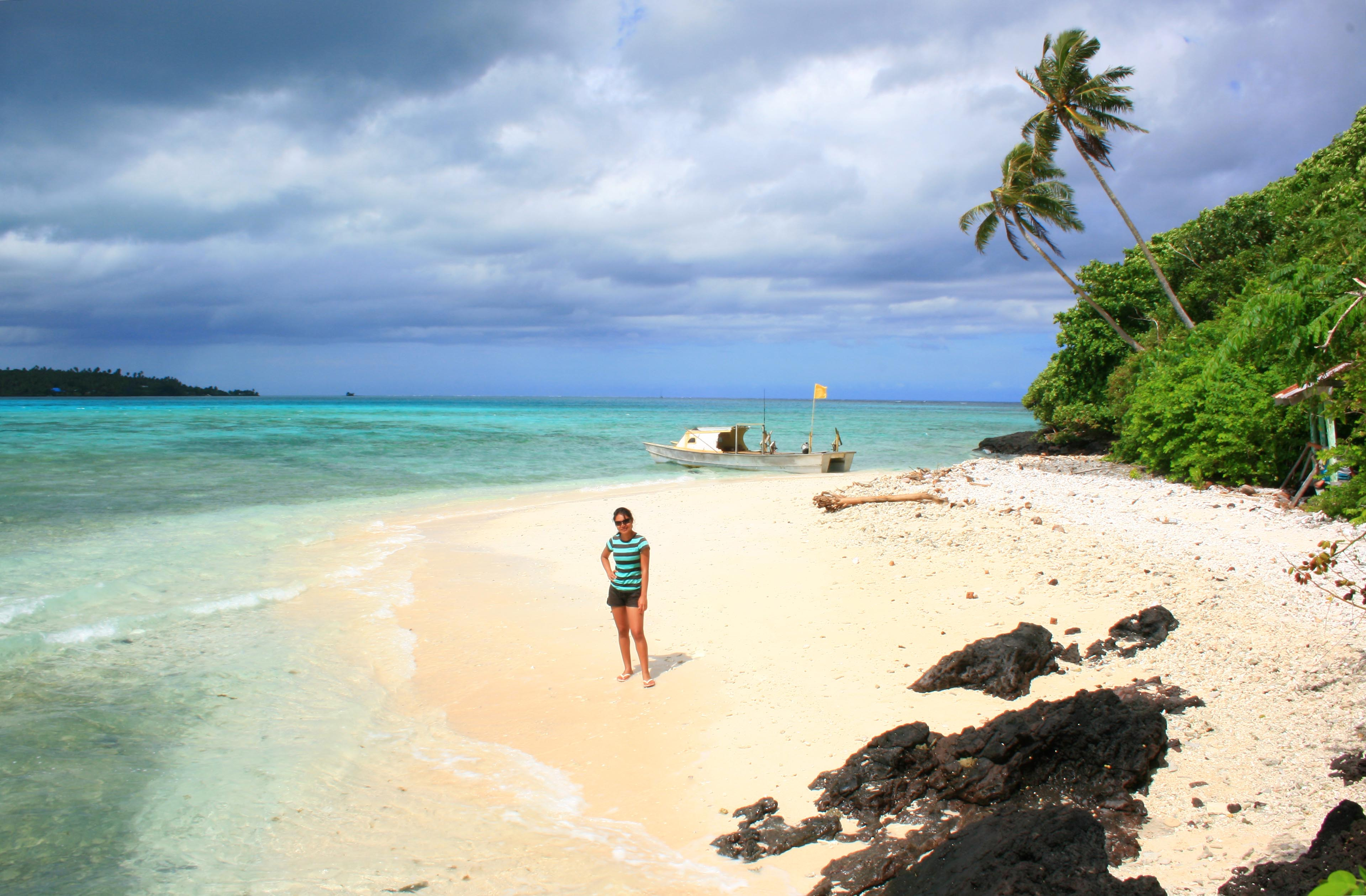
Visitor on a beach on the island.

== See also ==
- Samoa Islands
- Geography of Samoa
- List of islands
- Desert island
