= Apolima Strait =

Strait in Western Samoa

Coordinates: 13.819°S 172.172°W

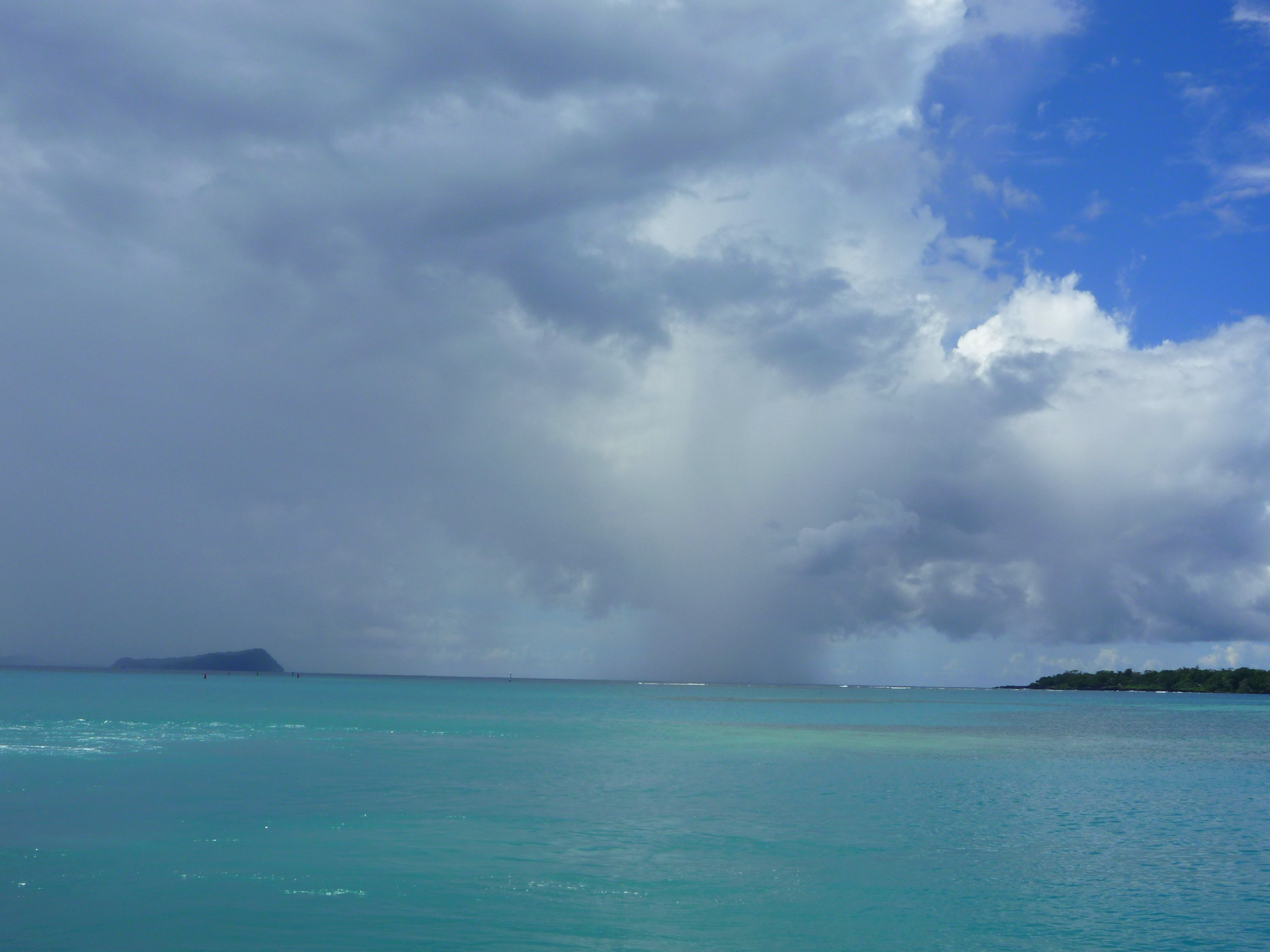
View of Apolima island (left) and the tip of Savai'i (right) from the ferry crossing the strait.

The Apolima Strait is about 13 km wide and separates the two largest islands of Samoa: Savai'i to the northwest, and Upolu to the southeast.

Three small islands lie in the strait. Two of them, Manono and Apolima, have small village settlements. Manono is about 3 miles off the west coast of Upolu. Apolima lies near the middle of the strait. The third, Nu'ulopa is a tiny, uninhabited, rocky outcrop with palm trees, which is surrounded by a natural turtle habitat islet.

The main means of transportation between the two larger islands - passenger and vehicle ferries operated by the Samoa government - run through the strait between Mulifanua wharf on Upolu and Salelologa wharf on Savai'i.

The ferry crossing takes about 90 minutes.

== Gallery ==
Apolima Strait

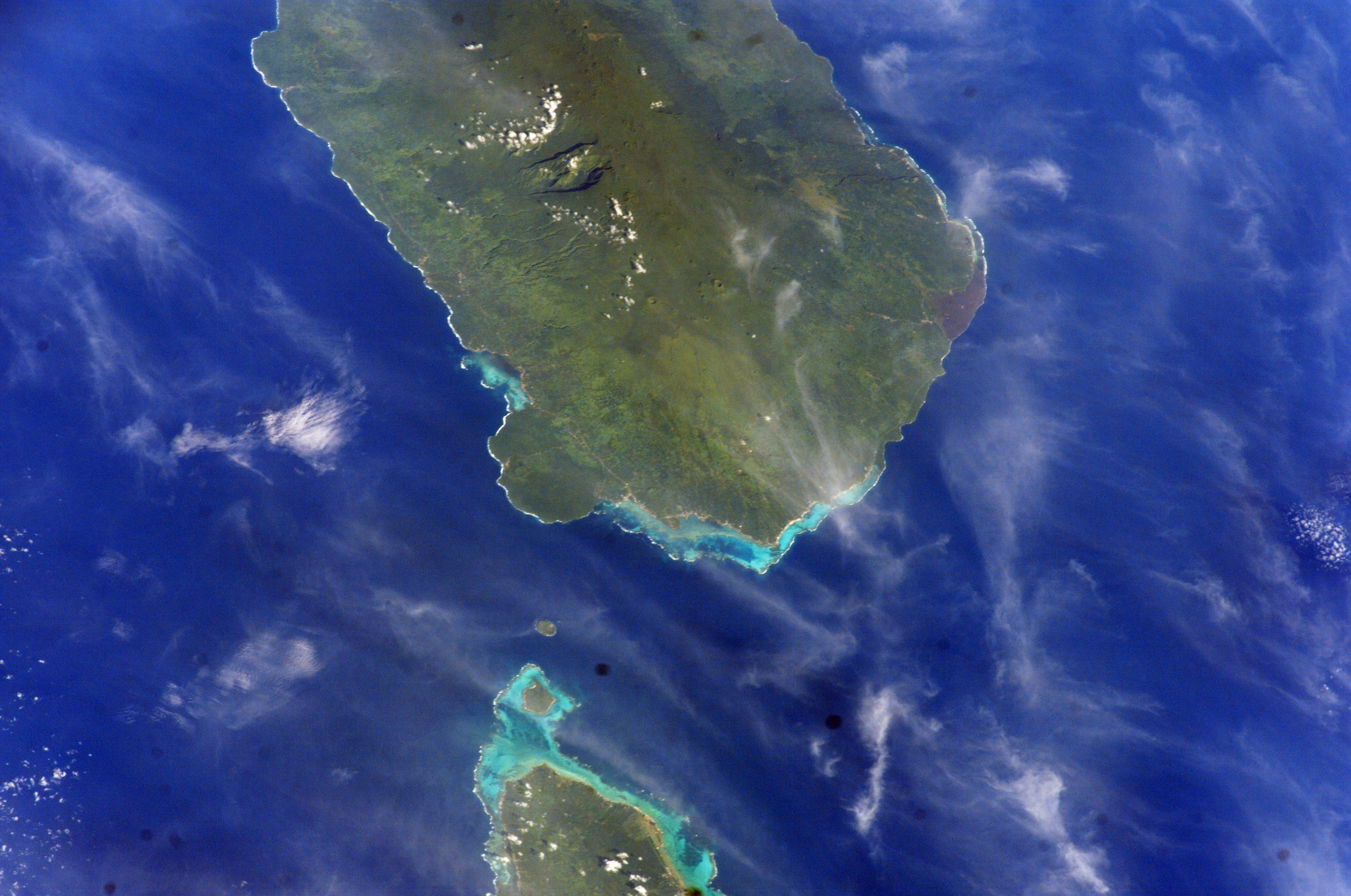
Apolima Strait with Savai'i (top) and the tip of Upolu below.

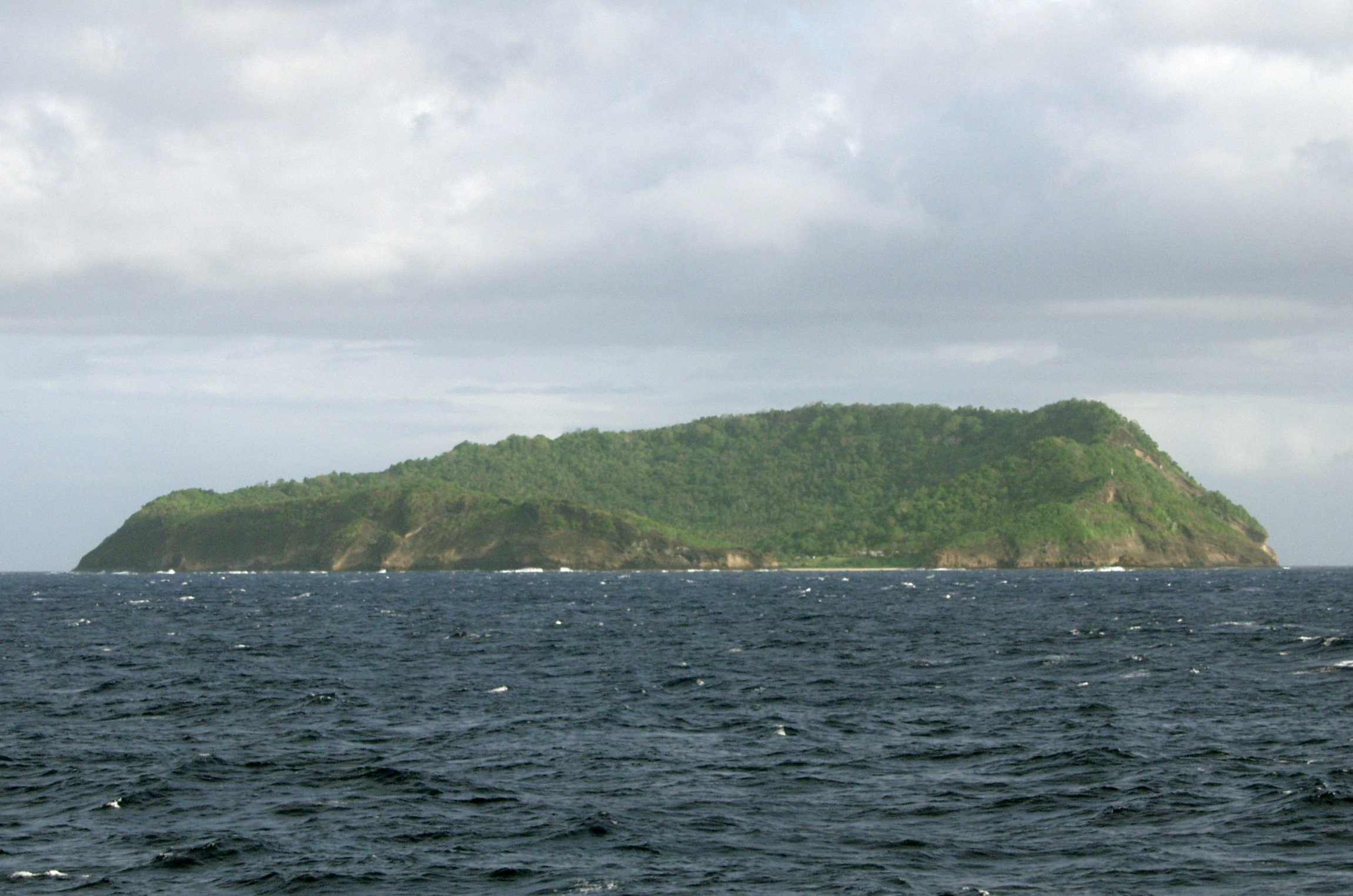
Apolima island.

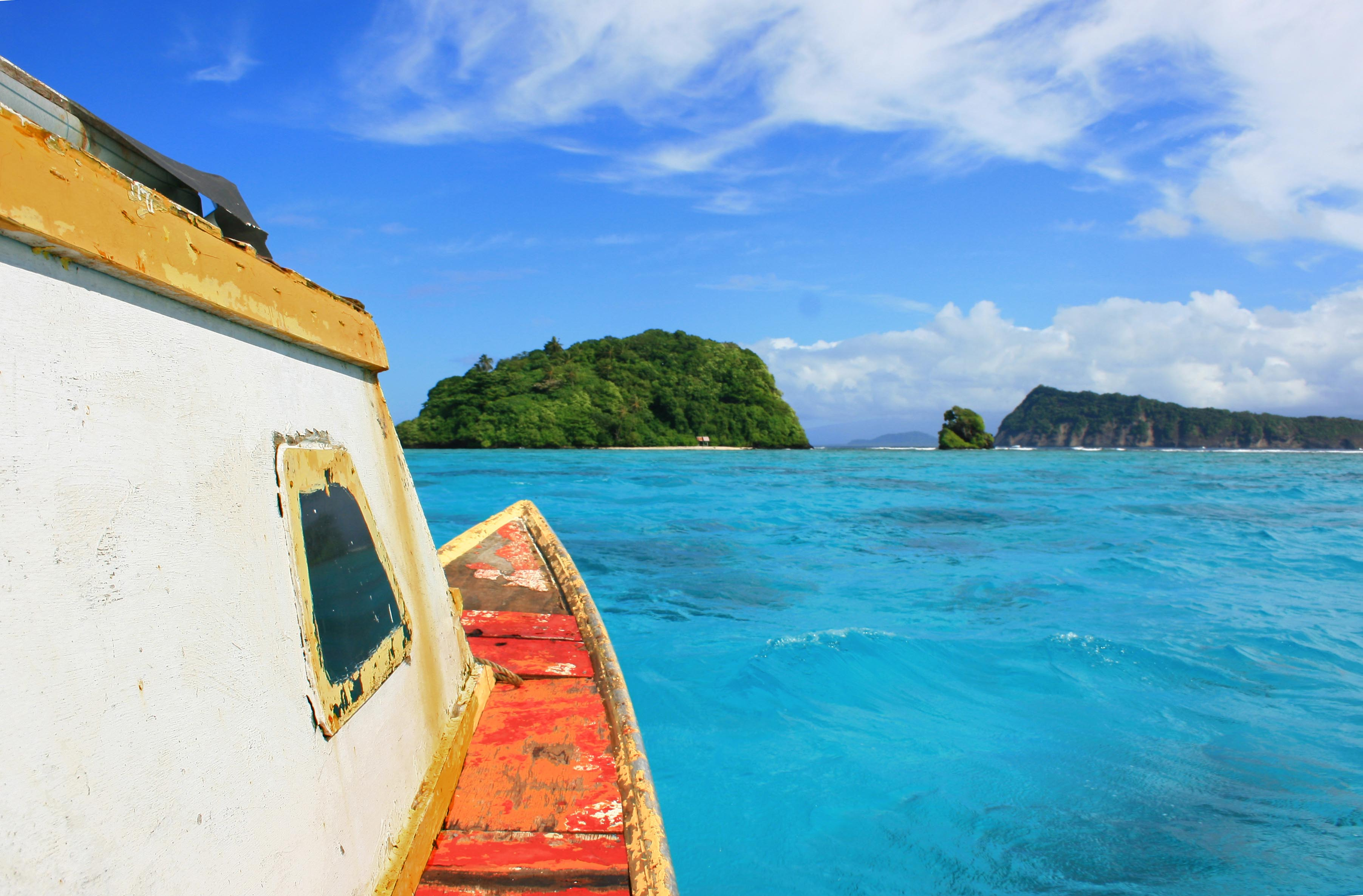
Heading by boat towards uninhabited Nu'ulopa island (left) with Apolima island (right)

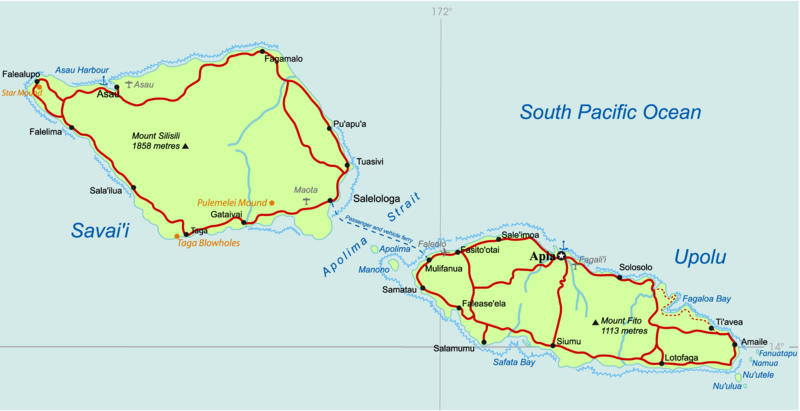
Map of Samoa showing Apolima Strait between Upolu (right) and Savai'i (left).

== See also ==
- Samoan Islands
- Geography of Samoa
