= Apolima =

Island in Samoa

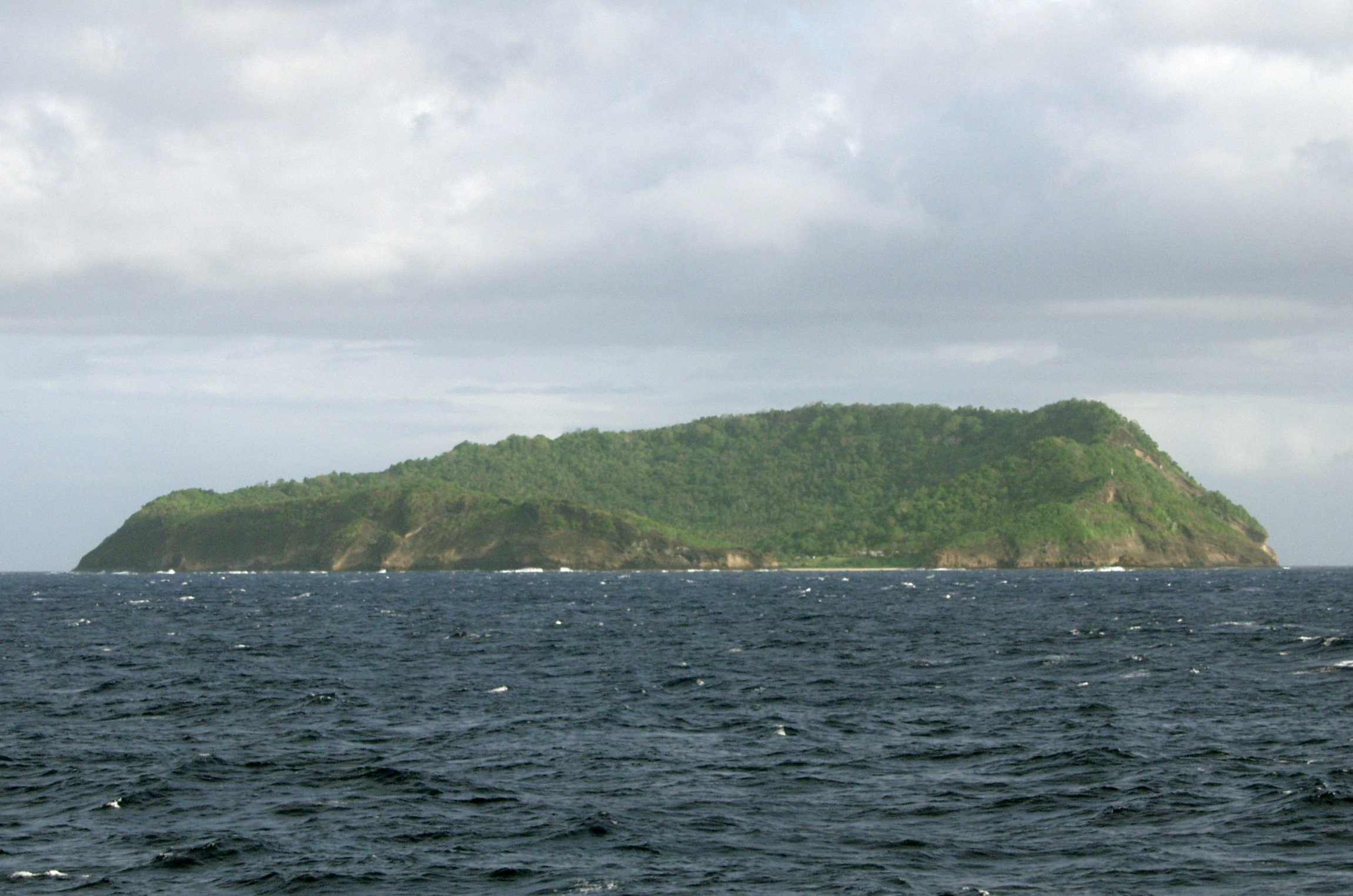
- Apolima seen from the Upolu-Savai'i ferry

- Location of Apolima in Samoa

Geography
- Location: Pacific Ocean
- Coordinates: 13.824°S 172.151°W
- Area: 1 km^{2} (0.39 sq mi)
- Coastline: 4.19 km (2.604 mi)

Administration
- Samoa

Demographics
- Population: 96 (2006)

Apolima is one of the four inhabited islands of Samoa, in the central South Pacific Ocean. It lies in the Apolima Strait, between the country's two largest islands: Upolu to the east, and Savai'i to the west.

The island has one village settlement, Apolima Tai, with a population of 96. The small settlement is situated in the interior's flat plateau, on the northern side. The island is part of the political district of Aiga-i-le-Tai.

The island's name is derived from "Apo i le Lima" meaning "Poised in the Hand", in reference to a Samoan legend where a prince used a spear to strike his brother.

== Geography ==
Apolima is an eroded volcanic cone with a maximum height of 165 m. Its area is slightly less than five square kilometers.

The tiny island lies 2 kilometres (1.2 mi) from Nuʻulopa and 9 km (6 mi) from Savai'i. The island is surrounded by steep cliffs, with a small wetland in the center.

There are two neighbouring islands in the strait, Manono Island, which has a small population, and the smaller, uninhabited islet of Nuʻulopa.

== Transport ==
The only access to the island is by boat. There are no scheduled ferry services, and the island's harbour is reachable only by a narrow gap through cliffs.

== Conservation ==
The vegetation of the island has been heavily modified by centuries of human occupation. The island is home to six species of land bird, including the Polynesian wattled honeyeater, Samoan starling, Polynesian triller, and Buff-banded rail.

In December 2006 the Samoan government proposed that the island, as well as neighbouring Manono Island and Nuʻulopa, be listed as a World Heritage Site due to its cultural history.

In August 2022 the Ministry of Natural Resources and Environment began discussions with local residents about eradicating rats from the island to protect the local environment.

== Gallery ==
Historical images of Apolima by Thomas Andrew (1855 - 1939)

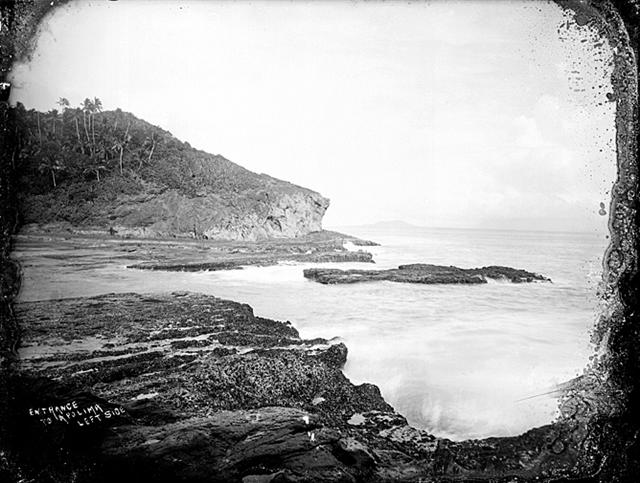
Entrance to Apolima, left side

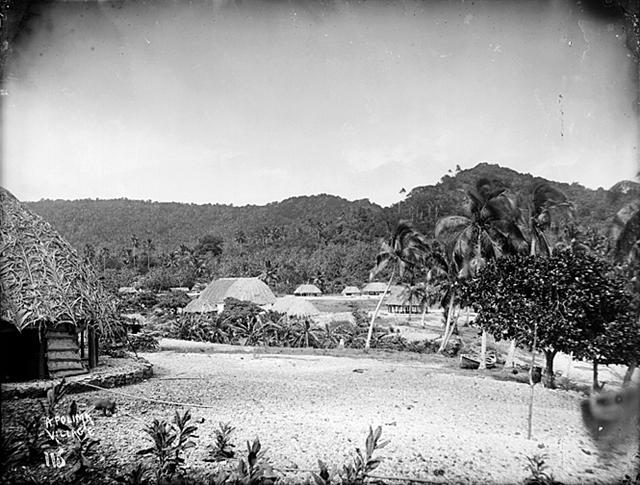
Apolima village, circa 1890 - 1910

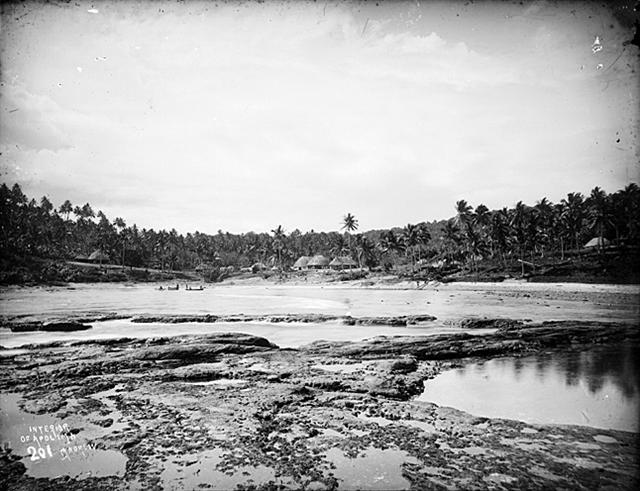
Interior of the island, 1904
