= Aiga-i-le-Tai =

Coordinates: 13°52′S 172°4′W

- District
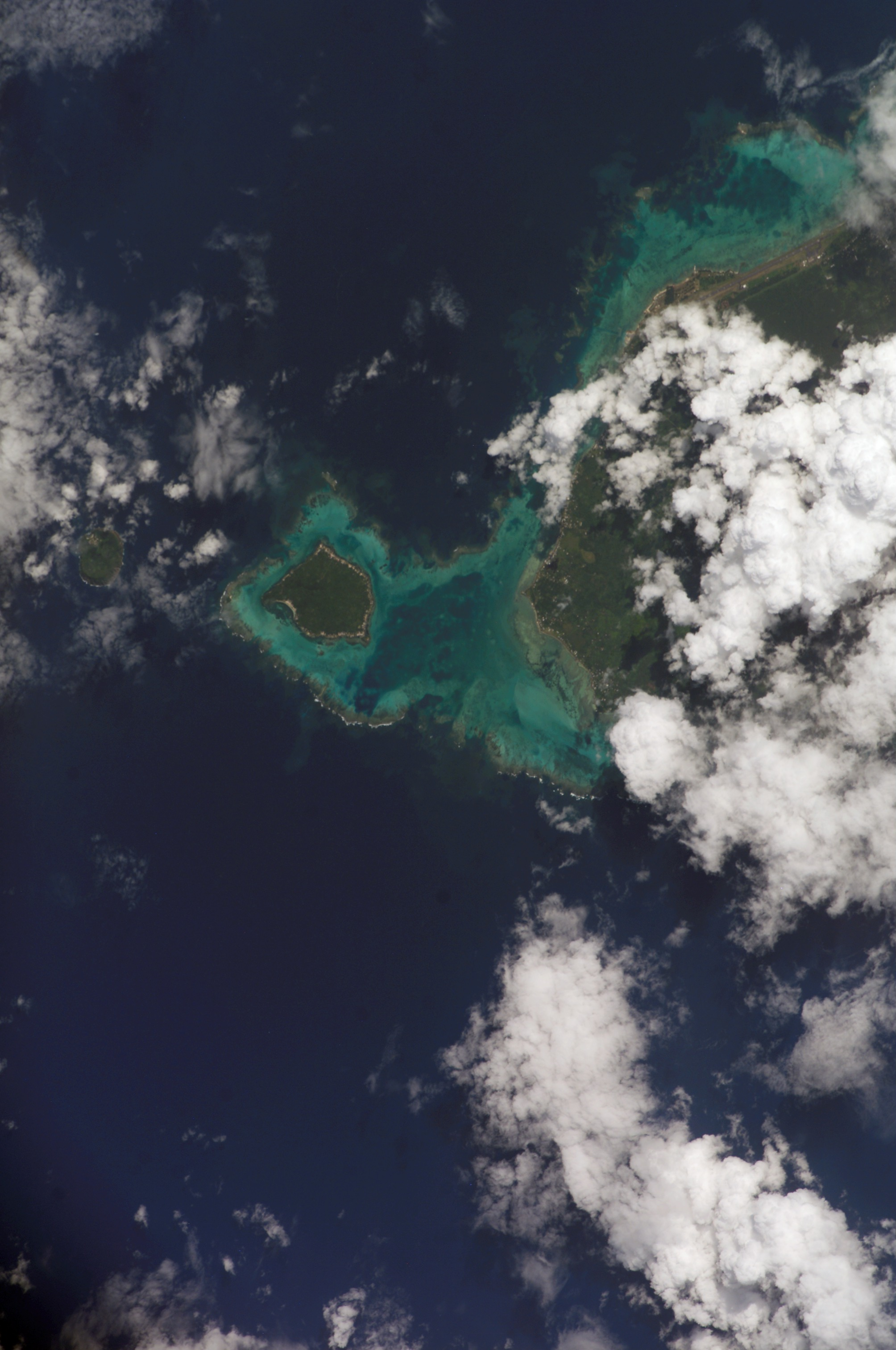
- Satellite photo showing Manono & Apolima islands & west end of Upolu under clouds. (NASA photo, 2006).

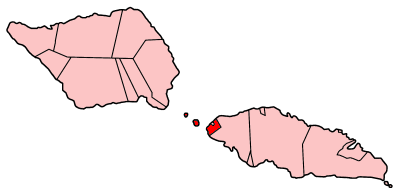
- Map of Samoa showing Aiga-i-le-Tai district
- Country: Samoa

Population (2016)
  - Total: 5,029
- Time zone: -11

Aiga-i-le-Tai is a district of Samoa which includes the small islands of Manono, Apolima and tiny uninhabited Nu'ulopa lying in the Apolima Strait between the country's two main islands of Upolu and Savai'i.

The district includes part of the mainland at the western end of Upolu and surrounds an exclave of A'ana district, namely Satuimalufilufi village.

Historically, Manono island has been the centre of the district. In modern times, the main centre is Mulifanua where the inter-island ferry terminal is located for ocean crossings between Savai'i and Upolu.

With an area of only 27 km^{2}, Aiga-i-le-Tai is the smallest electoral district in the country with a population (2016 Census) of 5,029. Va'a-o-Fonoti is the only electoral district with a smaller population.

The words 'aiga i le tai literally means 'family by the sea' in the Samoan language.

== Chief titles ==
Historically, the naval power of Manono and Apolima played a major role in political power-struggles between the national clans.

One of the most important chiefly (matai) titles in the districts is Luatutu Aupa’au Leiataua. The district is also a major leg of the Sa Malietoa clan. Manono plays an important part in the election of the Malietoa title-holders, as Malie village also consults with Manono in the election of title holders, hence the importance of the Malietoa title in this district.

== Mulifanua ferry terminal ==
Today, the ferry terminal at Mulifanua, situated on the northwest coast of Upolu, is the second-most important port on the island, after the busiest harbour in the capital Apia. The port is the main inter-island connection to Savai'i island. A regular passenger and vehicle ferry operates seven days a week, during the day, between Mulifanua and Salelologa ferry terminal on Savai'i. Views of Apolima and Manono can be seen during the crossing.

== Archaeology ==
Archaeology in Samoa has uncovered pre-historic Lapita pottery sherds and adzes at Mulifanua, discovered during expansion work on the wharf in 1973. The oldest date so far from pre-historic remains at Mulifanua has been calculated by New Zealand scientists to a likely true age of circa 3,000 BP (Before Present). The submerged Lapita site was accidentally discovered in the 1970s during work to expand the inter-island ferry berth. This is the only site in Samoa where decorated Lapita sherds have been found although plainware pottery remains are found in other parts of Samoa and American Samoa.

== Gallery ==
Aiga-i-le-Tai

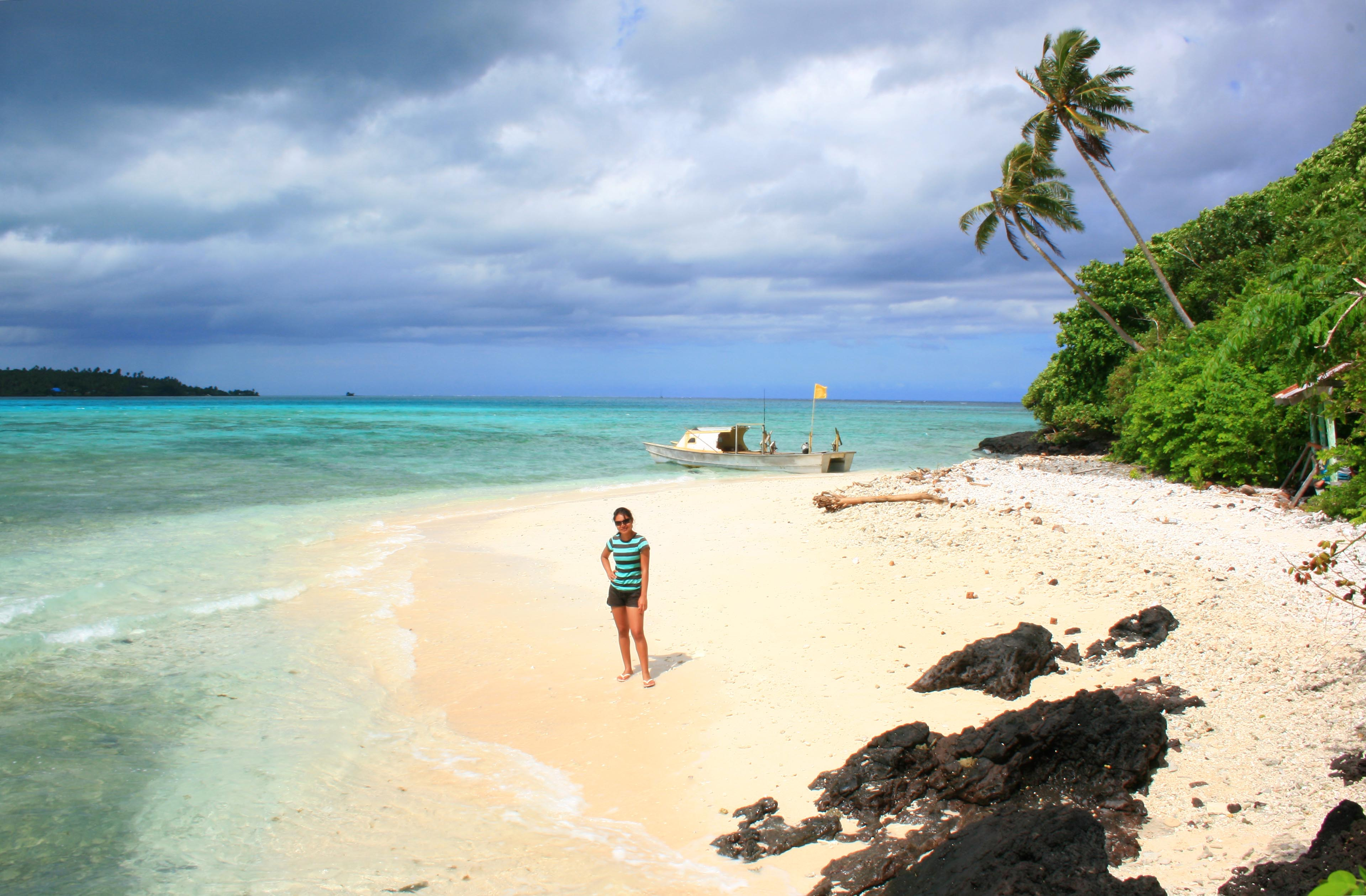
Visitor on Nu'ulopa island.

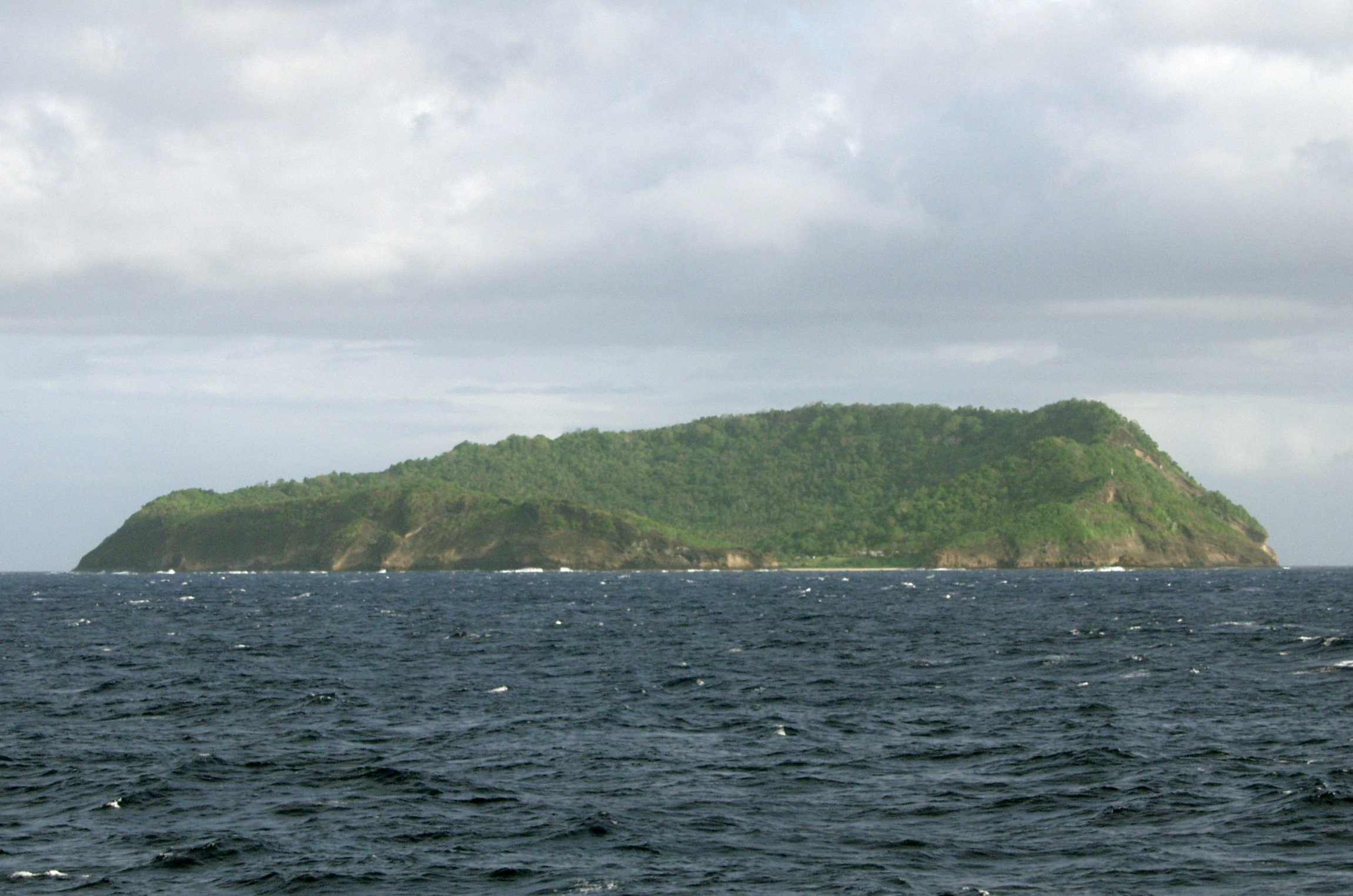
Apolima island.

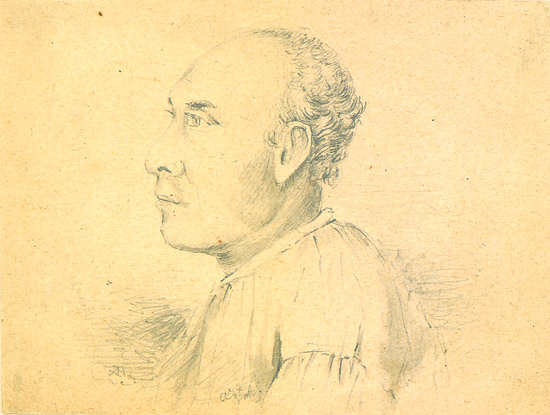
A matai, war chief Matetau of Manono Island, drawn by Alfred Thomas Agate (1812–1846)

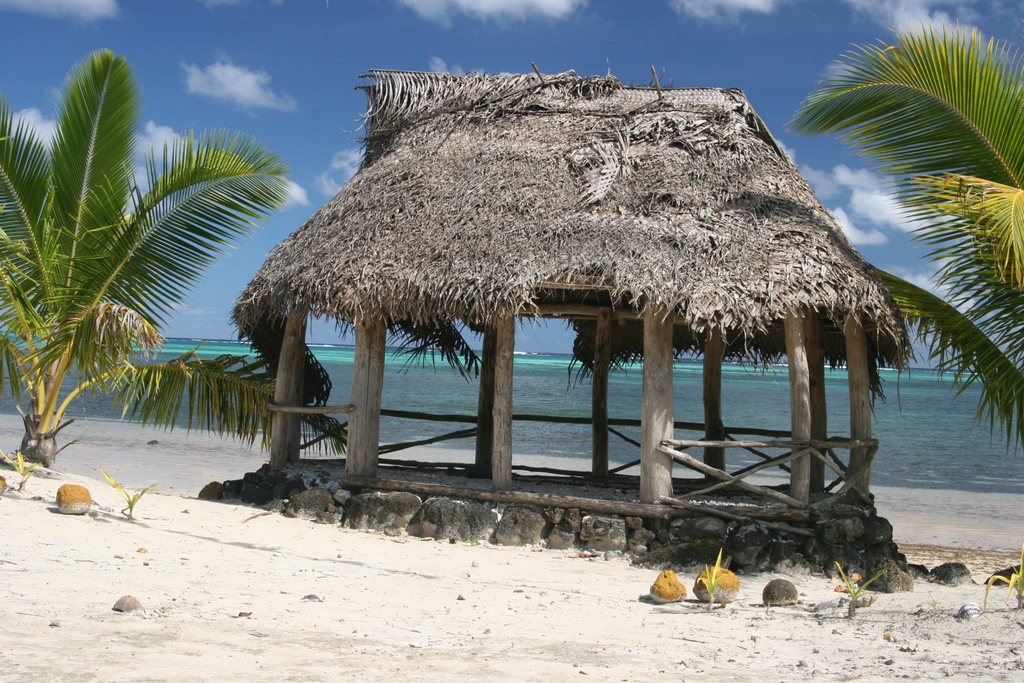
Faleo'o beach fale on Manono island.

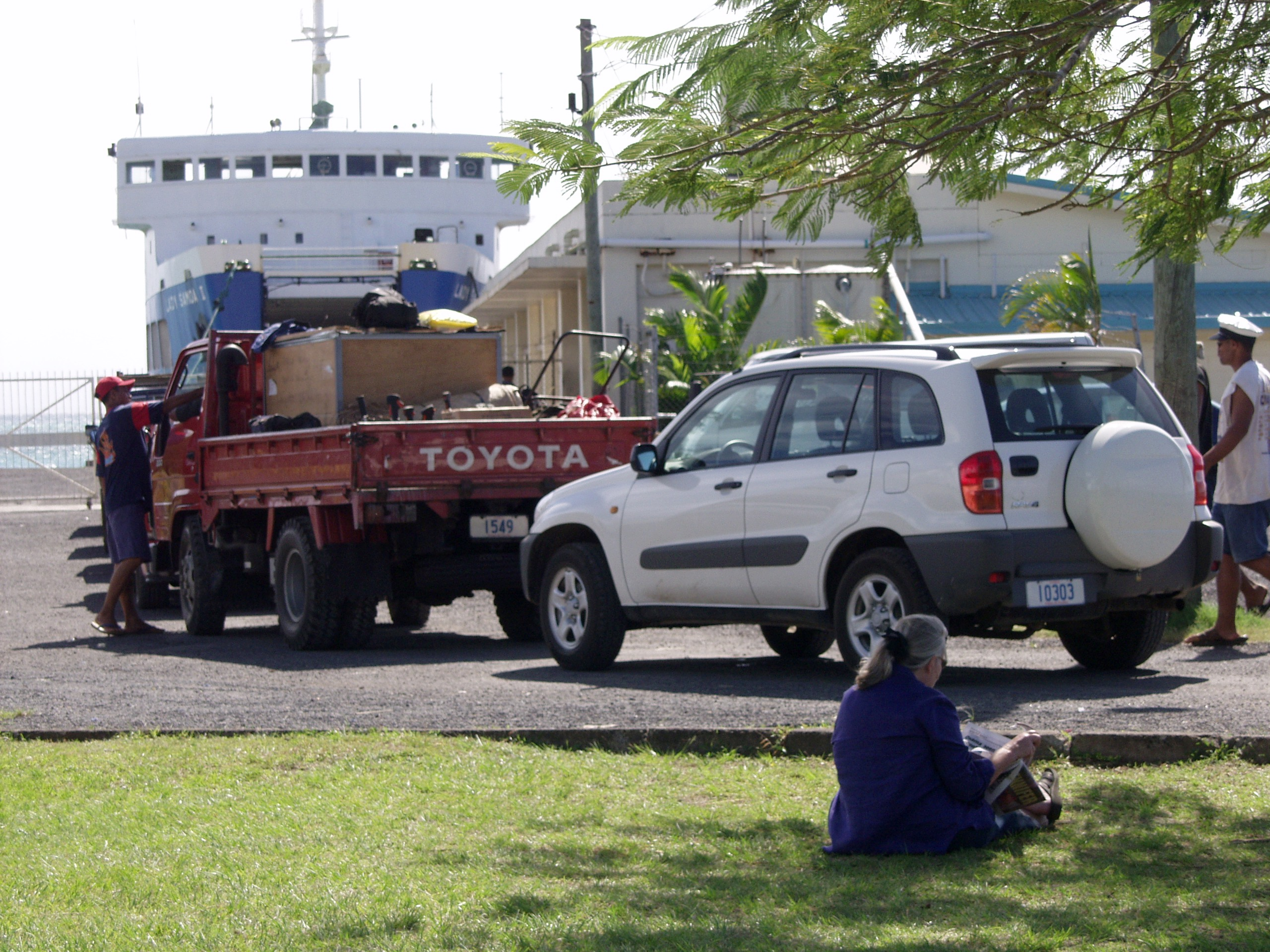
Cars wait to board the ferry at Mulifanua.

== Electoral results ==
2021 Samoan general election
Party	Candidate	Votes	%	±%
FAST	Laki Mulipola Leiataua	1,343	39.1	
HRPP	Leiataualesā Taupau Mulipola Oliva	831	24.2	−6.4
HRPP	Ifopo Matia Filisi Jahnke	727	21.2	−3.0
HRPP	Mulipola Atonio Patua Mulipola	328	9.6	
HRPP	Pouli Taialofa Naseri	205	6.0	
FAST gain from Independent		Swing	New	
