= Saleia =

Village on the north central coast of Savai'i island in Samoa

Coordinates: 13°27′S 172°22′W

Saleia is a village on the north central coast of Savai'i island in Samoa. The village is part of the electoral constituency (Faipule District) of Gaga'emauga 2 which forms part of the larger political district of Gaga'emauga.

The population of Saleia is 221.

Saleia is a sub-village pito nu'u of the larger traditional village district of Matautu which includes the villages of Avao, Lelepa, Fagamalo, Safa'i and more recently Satoʻalepai. Saleia is at the west end of Matautu, towards the popular tourist beach fale village of Manase.
