= Safa'i, Samoa =

Village on the north-central coast of Savai'i island in Samoa

Coordinates: 13°27′S 172°20′W

Safa'i is a village located on the north-central coast of Savai'i island in Samoa. The village is part of the electoral constituency (Faipule District) Gaga'emauga 2 which forms part of the larger political district Gaga'emauga.

As of the latest census, the population of Safa'i is 2226.

Safa'i is a sub-village pito nu'u of the larger traditional village district of Matautu, which encompasses the villages of Avao, Lelepa, Fagamalo, Saleia and more recently, Satoʻalepai. All the villages are situated along the coast, with the main island road passing through the settlements.

Safa'i is situated at the east end of Matautu, near the lava fields at Saleaula village. The neighbouring village to its west side is Satoʻalepai, which is home to a conservation area and turtle habitat.
