= Avao =

Village on the north central coast of Savai'i island in Samoa

Coordinates: 13°27′S 172°22′W

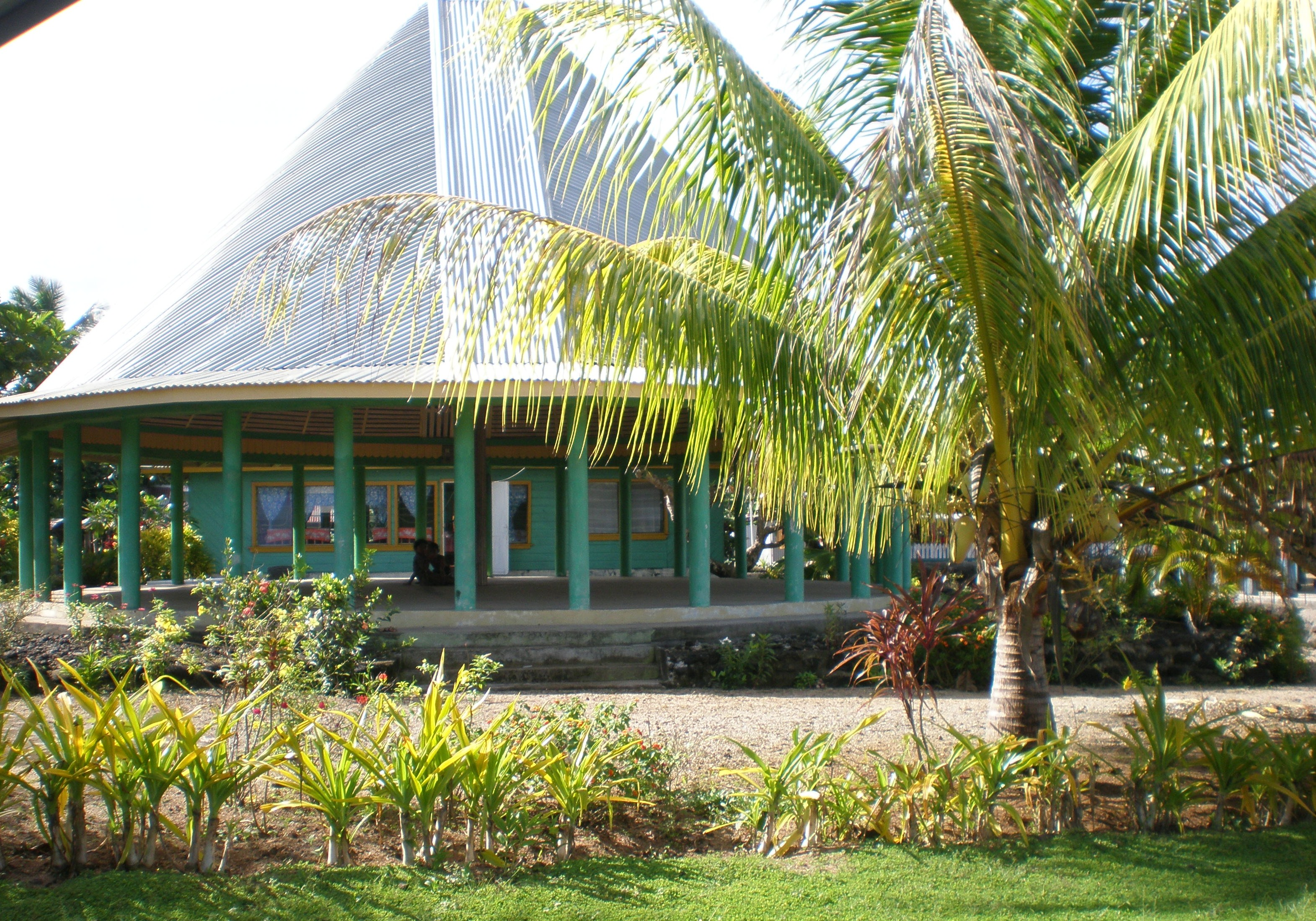
Round Samoan meeting house (fale tele) in Avao village.

Avao is a village on the north central coast of Savai'i island in Samoa. The village is part of the electoral constituency (Faipule District)of Gaga'emauga 2, which is included in the larger political district of Gaga'emauga.

The population of Avao is 279.

Situated by the sea, Avao is a sub-village pito nu'u of the larger village district of Matautu which includes the villages of Fagamalo, Lelepa, Saleia, Safa'i and more recently Satoʻalepai.

A turnoff south on the main road in the village leads inland to Vaipouli College and Itu o Tane Secondary School. The inland road is tarsealed to the schools.
