= Lelepa, Samoa =

Village on the north central coast of Savai'i island in Samoa

Coordinates: 13°27′S 172°20′W

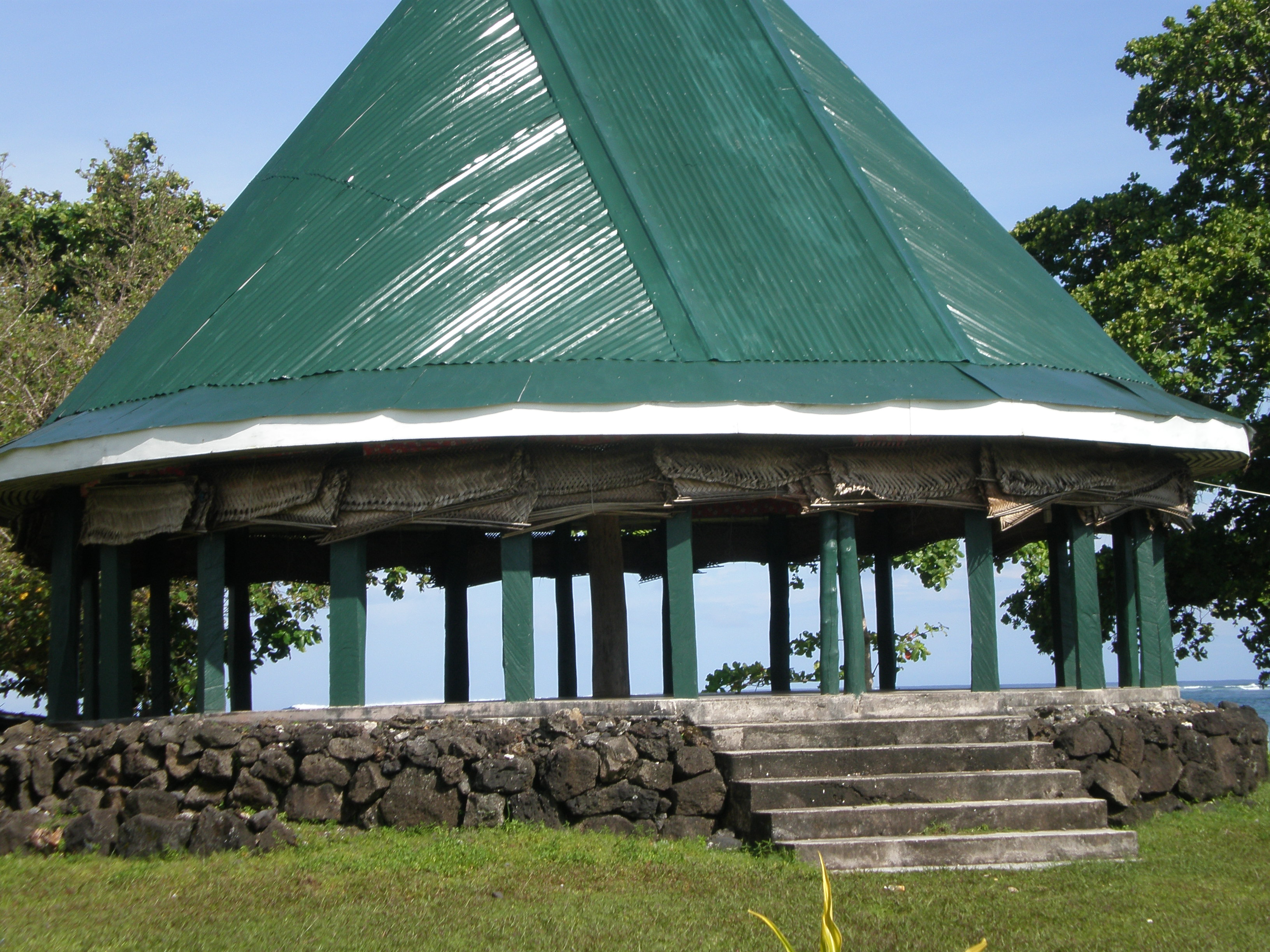
Fale tele, Samoan meeting house, Lelepa village, 2009.

Lelepa is a village on the north central coast of Savai'i island in Samoa. The village is part of the electoral constituency (Faipule District) Gaga'emauga 2, which forms part of the larger political district of Gaga'emauga.

The population of Lelepa is 279.

Lelepa is a sub-village pito nu'u of the larger traditional village district of Matautu which includes the villages of Fagamalo, Avao, Saleia, Safa'i and more recently Satoʻalepai.
