= Safa'i =

Safa'i may refer to:

- Safa'i, Iran
- Safa'i, Samoa
