= Matautu =

Name of different villages in Samoa

Matautu is the name of different villages in Samoa. Places named Matautu are found on the two largest islands, Upolu and Savaiʻi.

== Matautu, Upolu Island ==
On Upolu island;

- Matautu, a village located on the central north coast of the island to the east of the capital Apia. Apia Harbour, the country's main port is located in Matautu. The village has been subdivided into two parts. Matautu-tai (coastal) and Matautu-uta (inland). Matautu-tai is led by High Chief To'omalatai. Legend has it that wayfarers and travelers by sea must stop and give offerings to the To'omalatai before safe passage was allowed by Moaula the village guardian. Moaula is amongst the most revered spirits of Samoa.
- Matautu village (Lefaga), a sub-village or pito-nu'u of Lefaga, situated south west coast. The film location of Return to Paradise (1953 film) starring Gary Cooper.

== Matautu, Savai'i Island ==
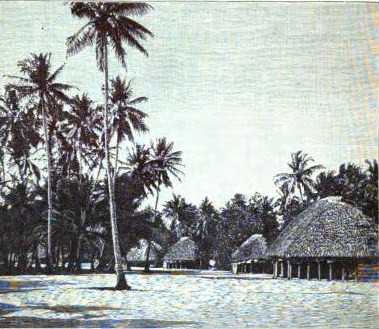
Matautu, 1902, Savaiʻi island

On the island of Savaiʻi, Matautu is a large village district on the central north coast in the electoral constituency of Gaga'emauga. Matautu is made up of smaller pito-nu'u villages including Fagamalo, Avao, Lelepa, Safa'i and Saleia. In more recent history Satoʻalepai has become part of Matautu. Situated inland from Lelepa are Vaipouli College and Itu-o-Tane High School. Matautu share strong kinship and cultural ties as well as natural resources including water which is piped from an inland river at Vaipouli.

During the late 1800s and the colonial era of Samoa, Fagamalo, which had a wharf and anchorage, became the main government administration centre on Savai'i. The centre included a hospital, school and court houses. Tui Fiti a spirit deity in Samoan mythology resides in a sacred grove vao sa in Fagamalo.

The Reverend George Pratt (1817–1894), a missionary of the London Missionary Society lived in Matautu for many years. Pratt authored the first Samoan English-language dictionary A Grammar and Dictionary of the Samoan Language, with English and Samoan Vocabulary, first printed in 1862.

According to oral history, Matautu is the district which takes the lead in the attack during war. Matautu is also said to have been settled by Fijians or people from a place called Fiti.
