= Le'auva'a =

- Village
- Location in Samoa
- Coordinates: 13°48′00″S 171°52′19″W
- Country: Samoa
- District: Gaga'emauga

Population (2016)
  - Total: 3,274
- Time zone: -11

Le'auva'a ('the people from the boat') is a village on the island of Upolu in Samoa. The population is 3274.

Although the village, with an area of 5.558 km^{2}, is geographically located on Upolu, the village is politically (and historically) part of the political district of Gaga'emauga on the island of Savai'i, as is the neighbouring village of Saleimoa. The village was founded by people relocated to Upolu during the 1905–1911 eruption of Mt Matavanu, with Le'auva'a being founded by villagers from Mauga and Samalaeʻulu.

Salamumu is another settlement on Upolu island which was also relocated from Savai'i following the volcanic eruptions.

Le'auva'a is part of the electoral constituency (faipule district) of Sagaga 3.

== Notable people ==
- Julia Ioane
