= Mount Matavanu =

Volcano in Savaiʻi, Samoa

Matavanu
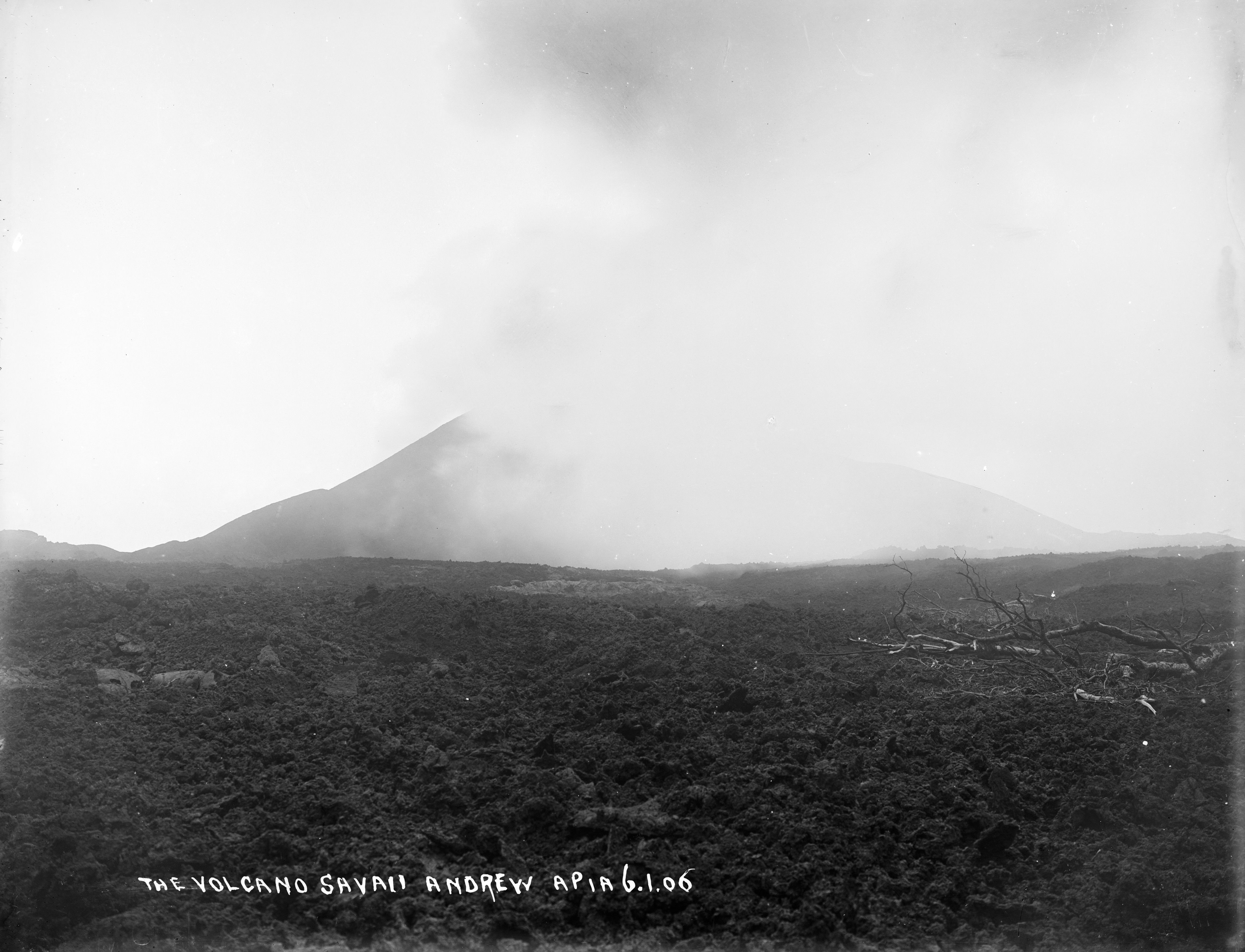
- Matavanu erupting, 1906

Highest point
- Elevation: 575 m (1,886 ft)
- Coordinates: 13°32′18″S 172°23′40″W

Naming
- Language of name: Samoan

Geography
- Location within Samoa
- Location: Savai'i Island in Samoa

Geology
- Last eruption: 1905 - 1911

Mount Matavanu is an active volcano on the island of Savaiʻi in Samoa. The volcano was formed during an eruption in 1905. Lava flows from the eruption covered a large area of land in the Gagaʻemauga district, leading to the relocation of several villages.

The name of the mountain refers to a valley (vanu) with an eye-shaped feature (mata).

In November 2022 Matavanu was recognised by the International Union of Geological Sciences as an international Geological Heritage Site.

== 1905 – 1911 eruption ==
The eruption began on 4 August 1905, with a new crater being formed nine miles to the east of Mata o le Afi, which had erupted in 1902. An expedition led by governor Wilhelm Solf observed flames shooting 400 feet into the sky at intervals of ten seconds along with lava flowing through the bush. An expedition to examine the crater found "a larger heap of stones about 300ft high, from the top of which, at intervals of about 10 seconds, masses of stone were being thrown up into the air". A lava-flow 100 feet high had flowed 2.5 miles towards the sea.

The early phase of the eruption was mostly explosive, but in September large amounts of lava had begun to flow from the crater. In mid-September, the cone was estimated at 600 feet high, and lava covered 20 to 25 square miles to a depth of 300 to 400 feet. In December the village of Toapaipai was destroyed by a lava flow, By March 1906 lava had reached the sea, and was flowing parallel to the coast along the top of the reef. The villages of Salago and Sale'aula were destroyed, and the destruction of crops from volcanic fumes was causing famine. In September 1906 geologist H. J. Jensen reported that lave flows had covered 35 square miles, and that what was once a low valley a hundred feet deep had been replaced by a bulging mass of dried lava 1500 feet high. The cone was now 330 feet high, and contained a lava lake. While Jensen reported the volcano was dying down, another explosive eruption began on 5 October 1906, and lava began to flow eastwards. In June 1908 lava was reportedly flowing in a stream 8 miles wide, but by July 1908 it had quietened again. In 1910 it was described as "the most active volcano in the world".

Activity finally began to die down in early 1911, and had ceased by October 1911.

Several villages were relocated to Upolu due to the eruption. The people of Sale'aula were relocated to Salamumu, while those of Mauga and Samalaeʻulu were moved to Le'auva'a.

== IUGS geological heritage site ==
In respect of it being 'one of the best examples in the SW Pacific of an oceanic hot spot and its early 20th century eruption', the International Union of Geological Sciences (IUGS) included 'The 1905-1911 Matavanu volcanic eruption' in its assemblage of 100 'geological heritage sites' around the world in a listing published in October 2022. The organisation defines an IUGS Geological Heritage Site as 'a key place with geological elements and/or processes of international scientific relevance, used as a reference, and/or with a substantial contribution to the development of geological sciences through history.'

== Gallery ==
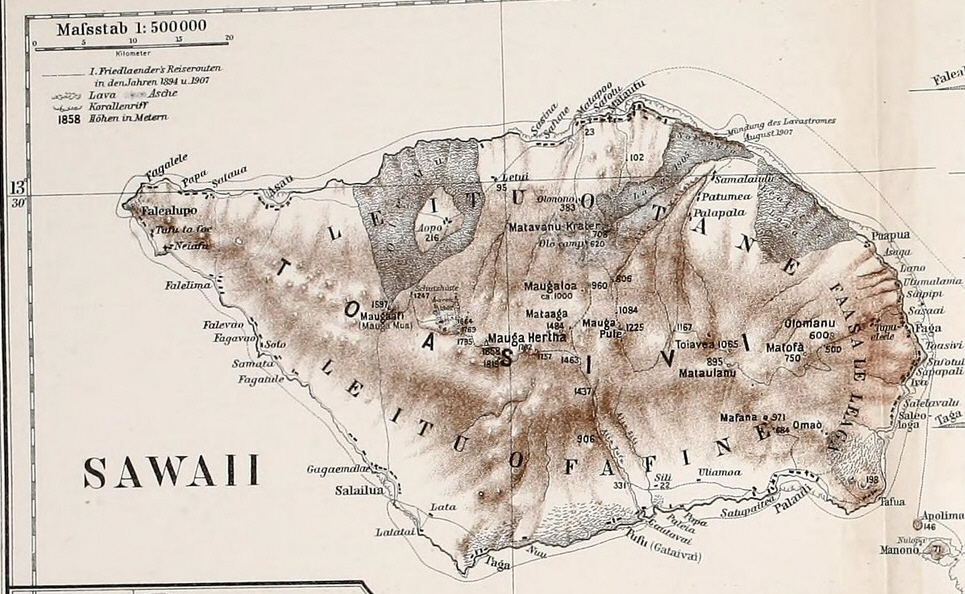
Topographical map of Savaiʻi - published 1910, shewing the lava fields since 1905

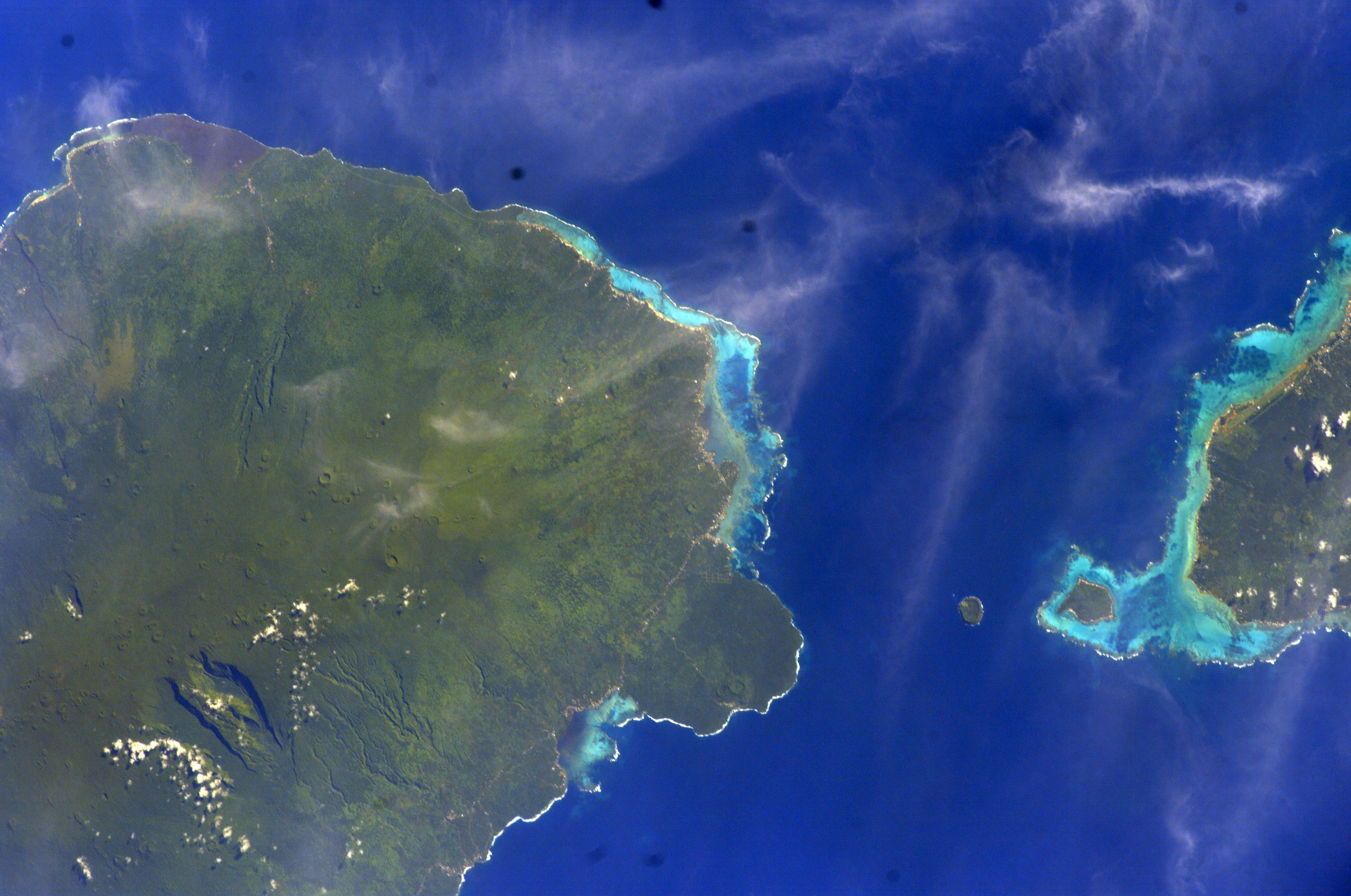
Savaiʻi (left island) with lava fields visible (top left) in Gagaʻemauga district (NASA photo, 2008)

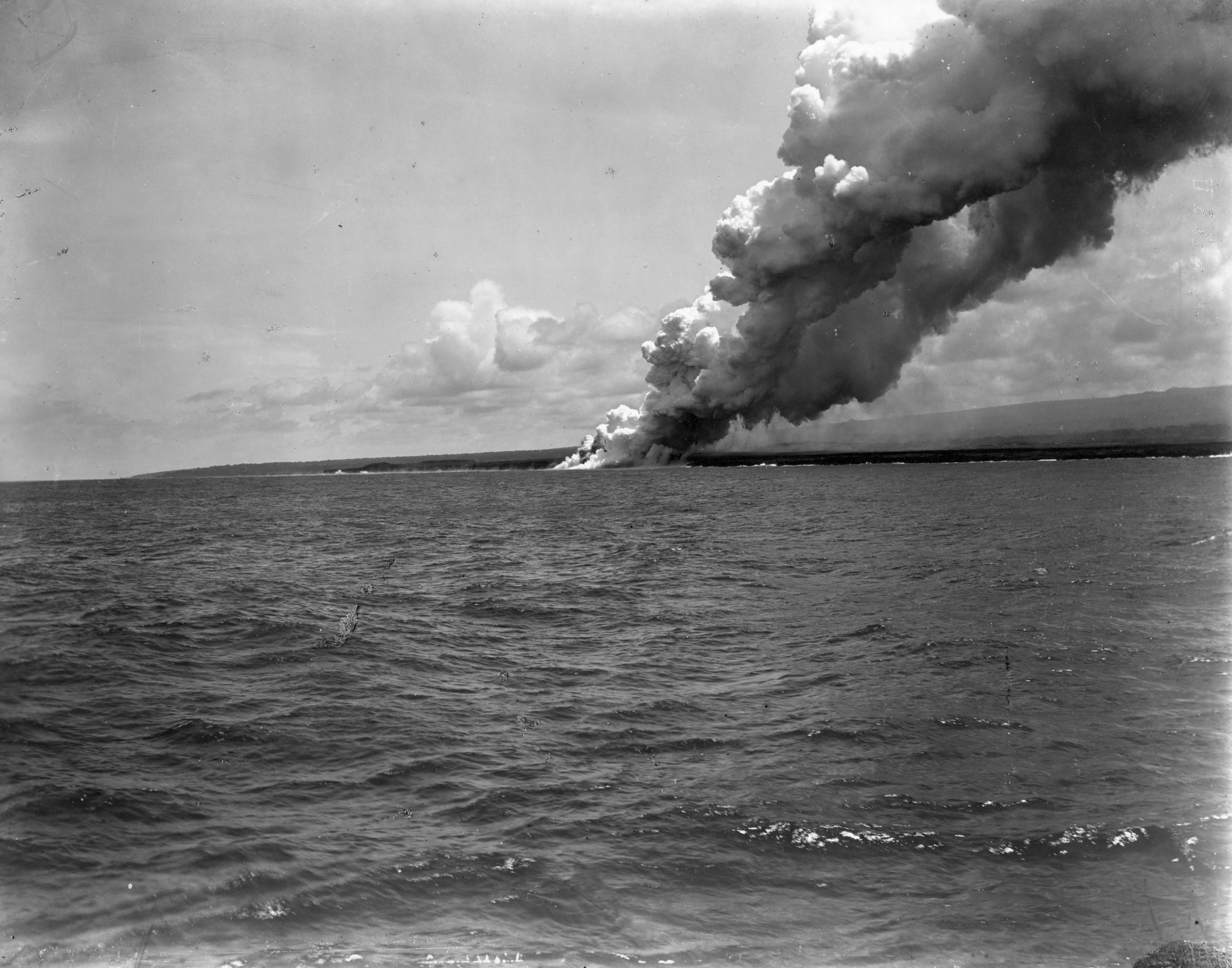
Matavanu lava flowing into the ocean along the coast and sending plumes of smoke skywards, 1905

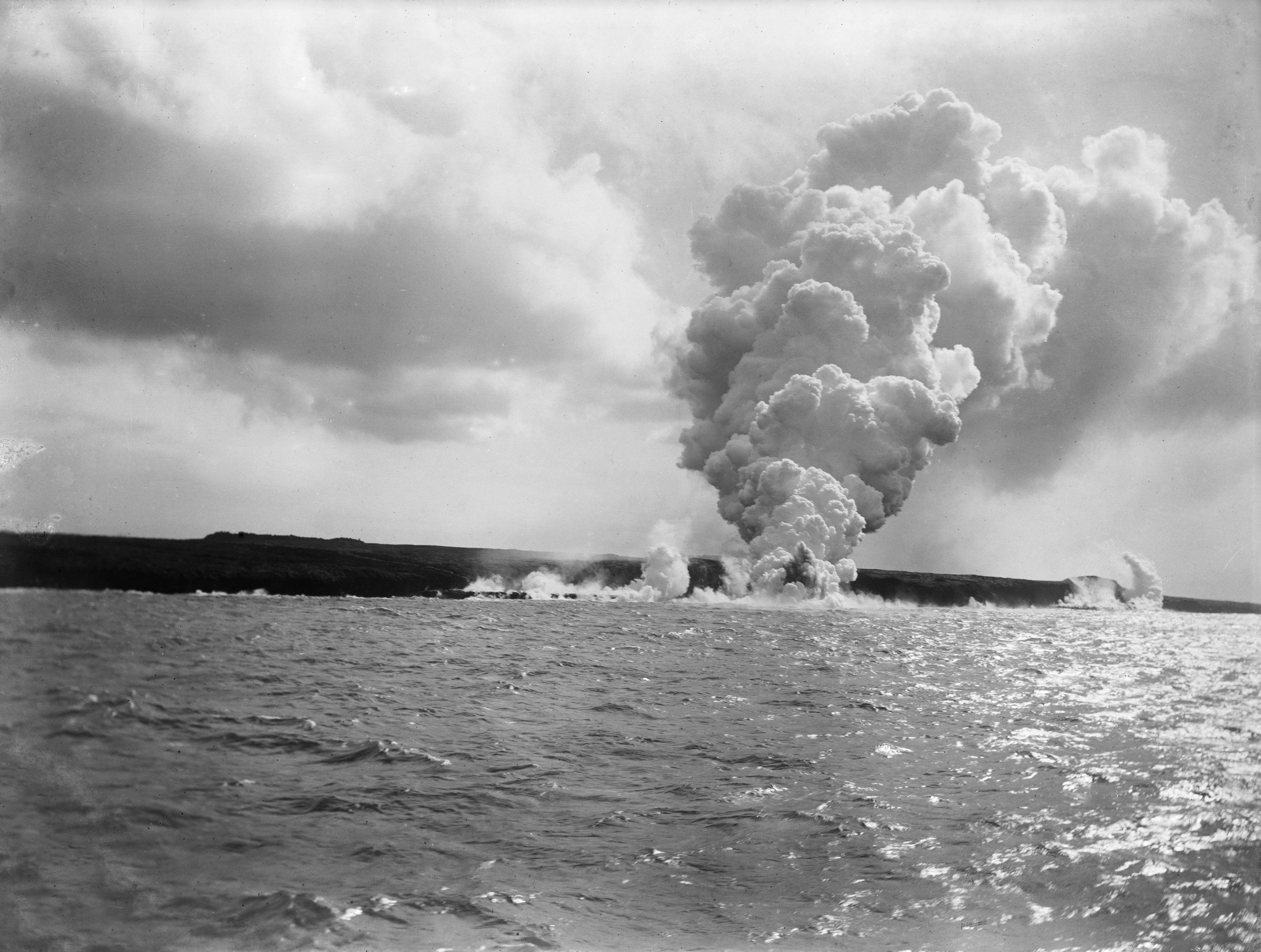
Eruption, 1905

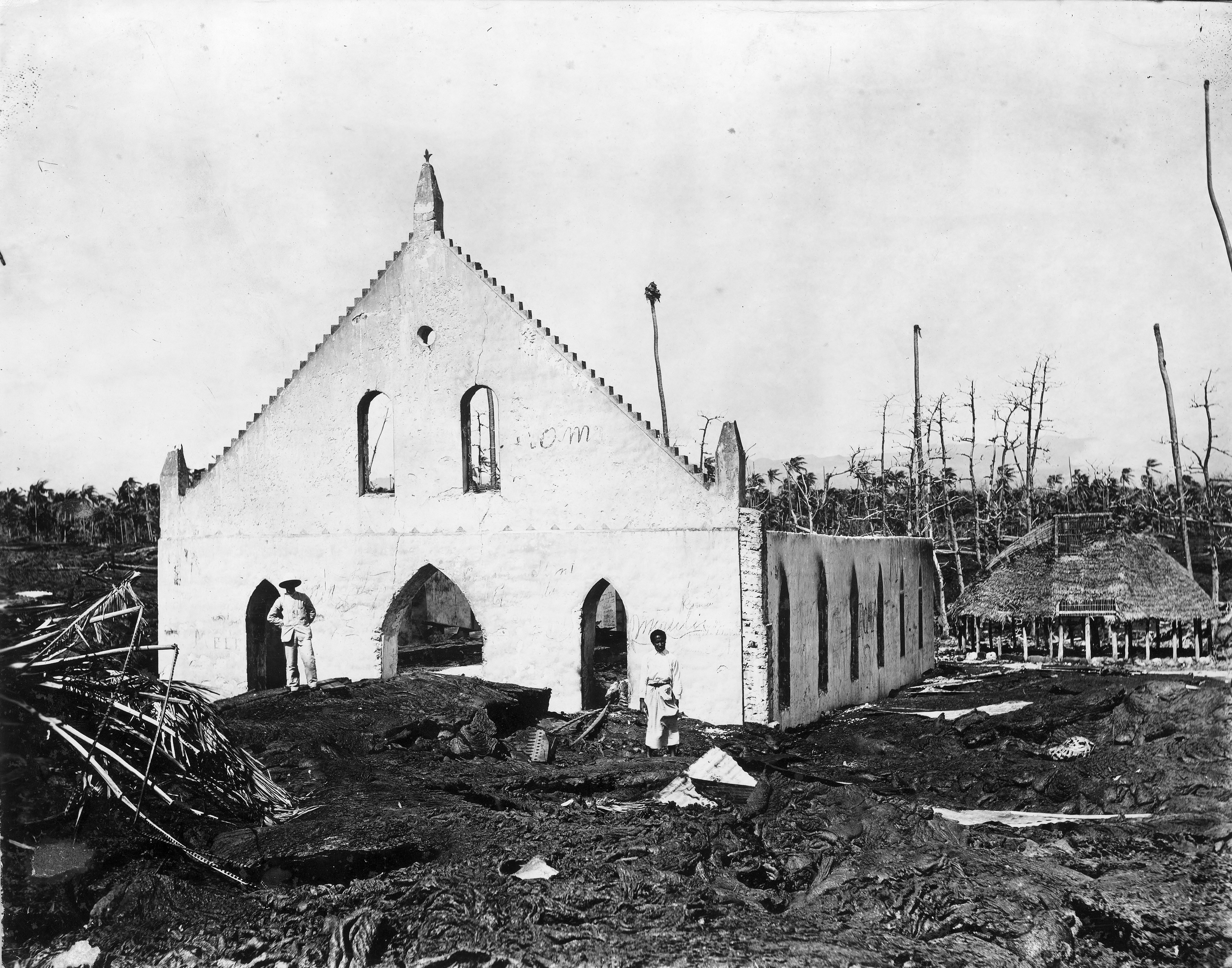
A church damaged by lava, 1905

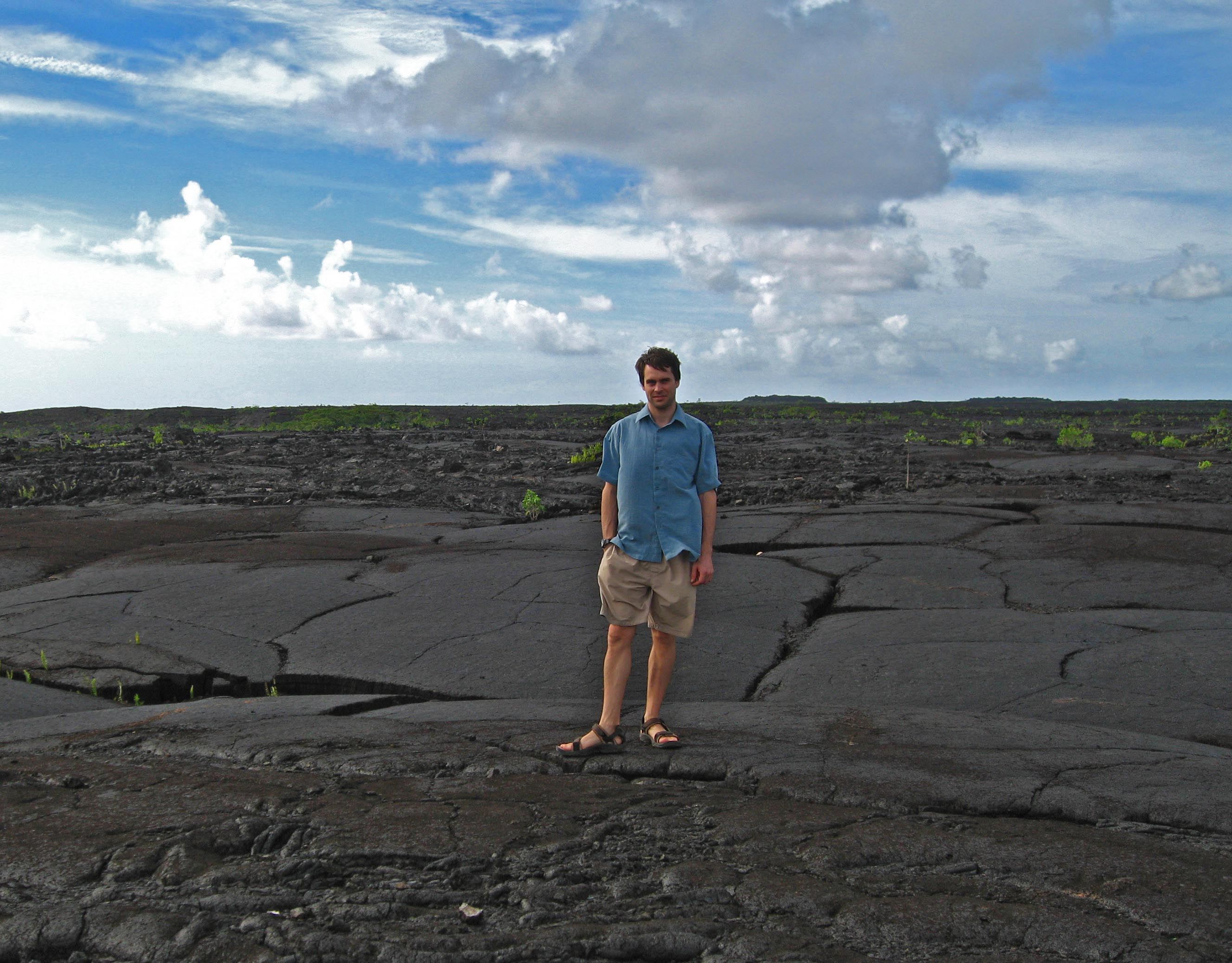
Lava fields on Savaiʻi, 2009
