= Tui Fiti =

Tui Fiti or Tuifiti is the name of a figure referred to in different legends in Samoan mythology and in other parts of Polynesia. In other stories, "Tui Fiti" means "high chief of Fiti."

== Savai'i ==
On the island of Savaiʻi in Samoa, a spirit deity called Tui Fiti resides in Fagamalo, a village said to have once been settled by Fijians. The special abode of Tui Fiti was a mound within a grove of large and durable trees called ifilele (Intsia bijuga). Tui Fiti's abode is called the vao sa, a sacred part of the forest which is tapu in Fagamalo.

Tui Fiti is referred to as the aliʻi (high chief) of Fagamalo. There are no other aliʻi chiefly titles in the village where all the matai chief titles are of orator tulafale status. Fagamalo is one of the pito nuʻu sub-villages of the greater Matautu village on Savaiʻi island's central north coast.

The missionary George Turner wrote in Samoa, a Hundred Years Ago and Long Before (1884) that Tuifiti was the name of a village god in Savaiʻi who appeared as a man who walked about but was never visible to the people of the place. However, he could be seen by strangers.

In 1978, the Governor-General of Fiji, George Cakobau, arrived in Fagamalo during a state visit to Samoa. The High Chief of Fiji had requested a visit to Tui Fiti's burial ground. Cakobau was bestowed the chiefly title of Peseta by the matai of Matautu in recognition of Samoa's ancient connection with Fiji. The matai chief title of Peseta is referred to as a manaia title, one of the highest chief titles in Matautu. The title Peseta is included in the faʻalupega genealogy in Samoan oratory for the people of Matautu.
