= Fasito'o Uta =

Village in Samoa

Coordinates: 13.812°S 171.941°W

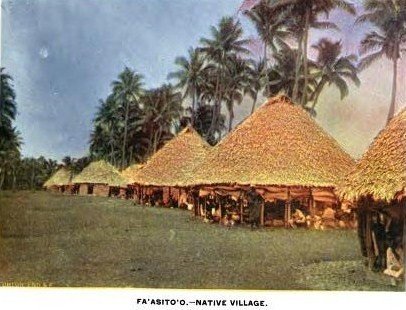
Image from the 1896 published book Talofa, Samoa: A Summer Sail to an Enchanted Isle

Fasito'o Uta is a village situated on the northwest coast of Upolu island in Samoa. The village is part of A'ano Alofi 2 Electoral Constituency (Faipule District) which forms part of the larger A'ana political district.

The population of Fasito'o Uta is 2147.

== Notable people ==
- Aiono Fanaafi Le Tagaloa
- Julia Ioane
