= George Pratt (missionary) =

British missionary in Samoa (1817–1887)

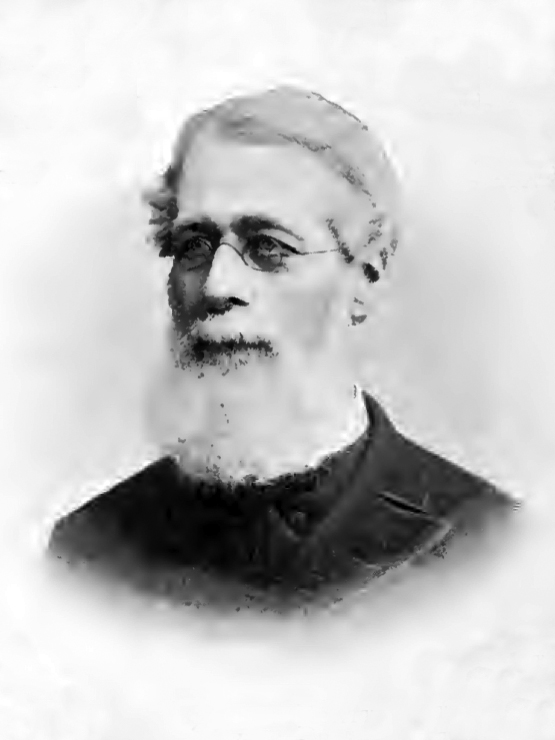
- George Pratt, LMS missionary to the islands of Samoa
- Born: December 1817; Portsea, Hampshire, England
- Died: 26 November 1894 (aged 75); Woollahra, Sydney, New South Wales
- Burial place: Waverley Cemetery, Bronte, New South Wales
- Occupations: Missionary, linguist
- Spouse(s): Mary Parsons Hobbs (m. 1838–44); Elizabeth Bicknell (m. 1844–)

George Pratt (1817 – 1894) was a missionary with the London Missionary Society who lived in Samoa for forty years from 1839 to 1879, mostly on the island of Savai'i. Pratt was from Portsea, Portsmouth in England. He also served in Niue, the Loyalty Islands and New Guinea. In Samoa, Pratt lived at a mission station in Avao Matautu on the north coast of Savai'i island.

== First Samoan Bible (1860) and dictionary (1862) ==
Pratt was the first person to document the Samoan language. He authored the first dictionary and grammar of the language, A Samoan Dictionary: English and Samoan, and Samoan and English; with a Short Grammar of the Samoan Dialect, published in 1862 by the London Missionary Society's Press in Samoa. Subsequent editions were published in 1876, 1893, and 1911. Reprints have been issued in 1960, 1977, and 1984. In addition, the first Bible in Samoan was mainly the work of Pratt. Indeed, during his "four decades in Samoa ... he worked almost daily on translating the Bible and revising his translation."

== Samoan songs and myths 1891 ==
He also collected Samoan songs and myths and translated them into a publication Some Folk-songs and Myths from Samoa, published in 1891. In this work is a section Samoan Custom: Analogous to those of the Israelites, where he wrote about cultural similarities including the importance of the number 7, embalming, natural eloquence, rod or staff of office, heads cut off in war, the use of slings and stones in war, possessions by evil spirits, the 'near sacred' relationships between brothers and sisters, calling the name of the chief who is to drink during ceremony, the giving of names and circumcision.

Pratt's valuable Samoan work records many old words of special interest - specialist terminology, archaic words and names in Samoan tradition. It contains sections on Samoan poetry and proverbs, and an extensive grammatical sketch:

For my own amusement in 1875 I wrote out a syntax of the Samoan Grammar. I was led to do this by observing, while reading Nordheimer's Hebrew Grammar, that the Samoan, in many points, resembled the Hebrew. Shortly afterwards the Rev. S. J. Whitmee asked me to contribute the Samoan part of a comparative Malayo-Polynesian Dictionary. I at once, with the aid of pundits, commenced revising the first edition of my Dictionary, which was printed at the Samoan Mission Press in 1862. I read through the Hawaii, Māori, Tahiti, and Fiji Dictionaries, and from these I obtained some words which occur also in the Samoan dialect, but which had been overlooked in the first edition. I also culled words and examples from Samoan genealogical accounts, songs, traditionary tales, proverbs, &c. In this way I have been enabled to add over four thousand new words or new meanings....That all Samoan words have been collected it would be useless to affirm. I would fain have had several years during which to go on collecting, but must needs be content to go to press with such as I have, as a new edition is called for, the former being out of print.

— George Pratt, Matautu, Island of Savai'i, June 5, 1876.

== Publications ==
- Pratt, George (1862). A Samoan Dictionary: English and Samoan, and Samoan and English; with a Short Grammar of the Samoan Dialect (1st ed.). Samoa: London Missionary Society's Press.
- Pratt, George. ʻO le tusi ʻua faʾamatalaina ai le Tusi Paʾia. Commentary on the Holy Bible in the Samoan Dialect. London: Religious Tract Society for the London Missionary Society – via Trove.
- Pratt, George (1878). Whitmee, Samuel James (ed.). A Grammar and Dictionary of the Samoan Language (2nd ed.). London: Trübner & Co.
- Pratt, George (1886). A Supplement to the Samoan Grammar and Dictionary. G. Pratt.
- Pratt, George (1887). O le Tala i Tagata ma le Uiga o Mea Eseese ua i le Tusi Paia. Bible Dictionary in the Samoan Dialect. London: Religious Tract Society. Revised in 1927 by C. J. Kinnersley (Misi Keniseli).
- Pratt, George (1887). Samoan Concordance. ʻO le tuʾu faʾatasi o upu e tasi ʻua le Tusi Paʾia. London: Religious Tract Society – via Trove.
- O faataoto ma tala faatusa mai atunuu eseese ua faa-Samoaina e palate. Fables from Many Lands Translated into the Samoan Dialect. Translated by Pratt, George. London: Religious Tract Society for the London Missionary Society. 1890.
- Some Folk-songs and Myths from Samoa. Translated by Pratt, George. Wellington: Whitcombe and Tombs Limited. 1891 – via NZETC.
- Pratt, George (1893). A Grammar and Dictionary of the Samoan Language, with English and Samoan Vocabulary (3rd ed.). London: Religious Tract Society for the London Missionary Society.
