= Vaipouli College =

Secondary school on Savai'i island in Samoa

Coordinates: 13°27′58.68″S 172°22′7.41″W

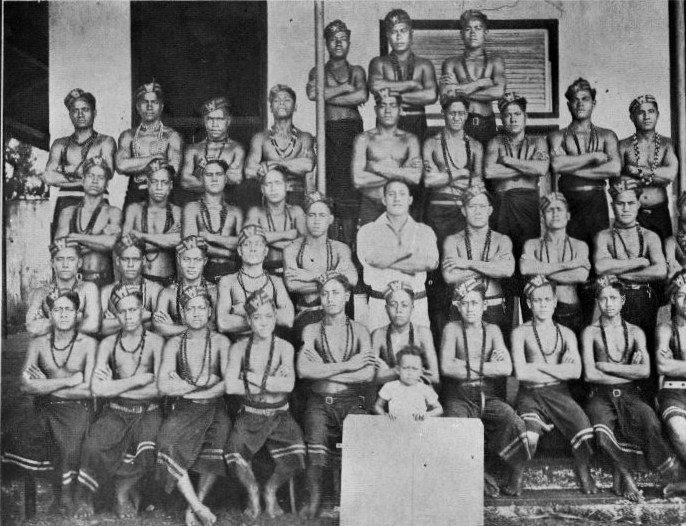
Pupils of Vaipouli school, ca 1930. The school uniform was a lavalava with two white stripes, which was also a symbol of the country's pro-independence Mau movement during the early 1900s. They also wear Samoan necklaces and caps.

Vaipouli College was a secondary school on Savai'i island in Samoa. The college is co-educational, open to male and female students from Year 9 - 13. The college was also known as Salafai College, in reference to Salafai, another name for the island of Savai'i. It was one of nine public secondary schools on the island.

Vaipouli College was founded in 1922 as an agricultural college for boys during the colonial administration of the country by New Zealand.

The college was situated in Matautu, 10-minutes inland from Avao village in Gaga'emauga district on the island's central north coast. The scenic drive to the college passes Itu o Tane Secondary School, plantations and Vaipouli Waterfall and river, the main source of water for the people of Matautu.

The college was closed in 2012.

== See also ==
- List of schools in Savai'i
