= Julia Ioane =

New Zealand Samoan psychologist

Academic background
- Education: University of Auckland
- Thesis: A comparison of Pacific Island violent youth offenders with Maori and Palagi violent youth offenders (2011)
- Doctoral advisor: Ian Lambie, Heather McDowell, Teuila Percival

Apaula Julia Ioane is a Samoan New Zealand clinical psychologist and academic, and is a full professor in the School of Psychology at Massey University, specialising in childhood trauma, family violence and youth offending.

== Early life and education ==
Ioane was born in New Zealand to Samoan parents, and speaks Samoan and English. She was raised in South Auckland. She holds the chiefly title Folasāitu from the village of Fasito’o uta, and also has ancestral links to the village of Leauva’a.

Ioane graduated with a Bachelor of Science degree from the University of Auckland in 1998. Ioane's interest in psychology had developed when working at the Ministry of Education. She realised that a family who were new migrants from Samoa were not going to understand the interventions they were being asked to make, and was told by the psychologist involved that there were not enough Samoan psychologists. Ioane then returned to Auckland University for a postgraduate diploma in psychology (2007), an honours degree (2010), and a Doctor of Clinical Psychology degree with a thesis titled A comparison of Pacific Island violent youth offenders with Maori and Palagi violent youth offenders (2012). Ioane also has a PhD degree titled "I was doing time too. Experiences of Pasifika parents in the Youth Justice system (2025). https://mro.massey.ac.nz/items/53cc2c68-d0b7-4107-92b7-173456a7ad1c

== Academic career ==
Ioane worked for a community provider of a programme for sexual offenders, and then the Regional Youth Forensic Service, before joining the faculty of Auckland University of Technology as a lecturer. She also began to research how psychology practice could be changed to be more responsive to the needs of Pacific people. Her work with young offenders led her to examine why some Pacific youths enter the youth justice system while others do not, despite similar family circumstances. Ioane later joined the of Massey University, where she became a full professor in 2024.

Ioane was an expert witness for the Royal Commission of Inquiry into Abuse in Care, providing evidence on the system changes required to provide redress from a Pacific perspective. She has also consulted to the judiciary in Samoa, and is on a number of governance boards and advisory boards in New Zealand.

== Selected works ==
- Lambie, Ian David; Julia Ioane; Isabel Randell; Seymour, Frederick William (2013). "Offending behaviours of child and adolescent firesetters over a 10-year follow-up". Journal of Child Psychology and Psychiatry. 54 (12): 1295–1307. doi:10.1111/jcpp.12126. PMID 23927002. Wikidata Q39370345.
- Julia Ioane; Lambie, Ian David; Percival, Teuila Mary (2014). "A Comparison of Pacific, Māori, and European Violent Youth Offenders in New Zealand". International Journal of Offender Therapy and Comparative Criminology. 60 (6): 657–674. doi:10.1177/0306624x14560725. PMID 25476711. Wikidata Q39083574.
- Julia Ioane (November 2017), Talanoa with Pasifika youth and their families, vol. 46, pp. 38–45, Wikidata Q124102064
- Julia Ioane; Percival, Teuila Mary; Laban, Winnie; Lambie, Ian David (2021). "All of community by all-of-government: reaching Pacific people in Aotearoa New Zealand during the Covid-19 pandemic" (PDF). The New Zealand Medical Journal (in undetermined language). 134 (1533): 96–103. ISSN 0028-8446. Wikidata Q124102063.
- Julia Ioane; Lambie, Ian David (2016). "Pacific youth and violent offending in Aotearoa New Zealand". New Zealand Journal of Psychology (in undetermined language). 45: 23–29. ISSN 0112-109X. Wikidata Q124102062.
- Julia Ioane; Tudor, Keith (2017). "The fa'asamoa, person-centered theory and cross-cultural practice". Person-Centered and Experiential Psychotherapies. 16 (4): 287–302. doi:10.1080/14779757.2017.1361467. Wikidata Q124102069.
- Julia Ioane; Lambie, Ian David; Percival, Teuila Mary (2013). "A review of the literature on Pacific Island youth offending in New Zealand". Aggression and Violent Behavior. 18 (4): 426–433. doi:10.1016/j.avb.2013.05.002. Wikidata Q60638826.
