= Salamumu =

Coordinates: 13°59′53″S 171°55′19″W

Salamumu is a village on the south west coast of Upolu island in Samoa. The village has two settlements, Salamumu Uta (population 338) and Salamumu Tai (population 33).

The village's name is derived from the words sala and mumu, meaning "fire punishment", and refers to its origin when people from Sale'aula were relocated to Upolu during the 1905—1911 eruption of Mt Matavanu.

Although the village, area 13.11 km^{2}, is geographically located on Upolu, the village is politically (and historically) part of the Gaga'emauga electoral district on the island of Savai'i.

The people of Salamumu still have strong kinship cultural ties to their land on Savai'i.

Le'auva'a is another settlement on Upolu island which was also relocated from Savai'i following the volcanic eruptions.

== Climate ==
Salamumu has a tropical rainforest climate (Af) with heavy to very heavy rainfall year-round.

Climate data for Salamumu
Month	Jan	Feb	Mar	Apr	May	Jun	Jul	Aug	Sep	Oct	Nov	Dec	Year
Mean daily maximum °C (°F)	29.5 (85.1)	29.6 (85.3)	29.7 (85.5)	29.4 (84.9)	28.6 (83.5)	27.9 (82.2)	27.4 (81.3)	27.6 (81.7)	28.4 (83.1)	28.8 (83.8)	29.1 (84.4)	29.3 (84.7)	28.8 (83.8)
Daily mean °C (°F)	26.4 (79.5)	26.4 (79.5)	26.6 (79.9)	26.4 (79.5)	26.0 (78.8)	25.7 (78.3)	25.2 (77.4)	25.3 (77.5)	25.7 (78.3)	25.9 (78.6)	26.1 (79.0)	26.2 (79.2)	26.0 (78.8)
Mean daily minimum °C (°F)	23.3 (73.9)	23.3 (73.9)	23.5 (74.3)	23.4 (74.1)	23.4 (74.1)	23.6 (74.5)	23.1 (73.6)	23.1 (73.6)	23.0 (73.4)	23.1 (73.6)	23.2 (73.8)	23.2 (73.8)	23.3 (73.9)
Average precipitation mm (inches)	506 (19.9)	389 (15.3)	355 (14.0)	231 (9.1)	196 (7.7)	115 (4.5)	114 (4.5)	146 (5.7)	164 (6.5)	268 (10.6)	300 (11.8)	410 (16.1)	3,194 (125.7)
Source: Climate-Data.org
