= Teuila Percival =

New Zealand paediatrician

Dame Teuila Percival DNZM QSO
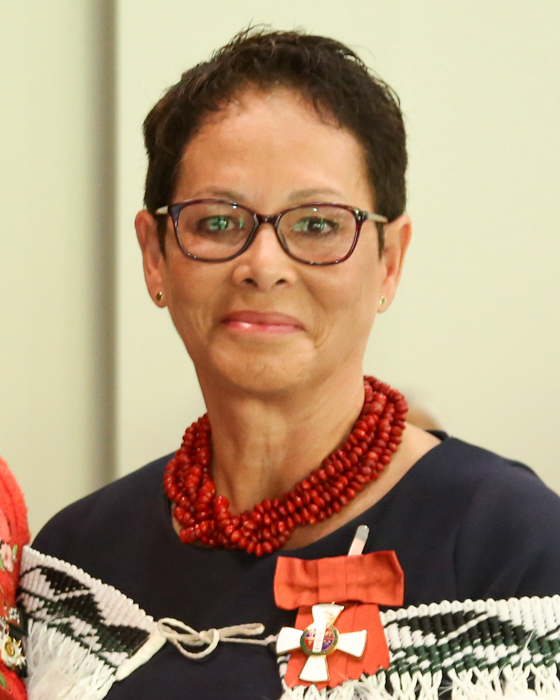
- Percival in 2024
- Born: Teuila Mary Siatu'u; Auckland, New Zealand
- Education: Thames High School
- Alma mater: University of Auckland
- Occupation: Paediatrician
- Spouse: John McEnteer
- Children: 3

Dame Teuila Mary Percival DNZM QSO (née Siatu'u) is a New Zealand paediatrician and health researcher. She was co-founder of South Seas Healthcare in South Auckland in 1999, and has advocated for Pacific children's health in New Zealand and the Pacific region.

== Early life, family and education ==
Percival was born in Auckland, the second of four children of Fiola Siatu'u and Patricia Mary Siatu'u (née Higgs). Her father was born in Samoa and her mother's family came from Blackpool in England; they met in Auckland when both were training to become radiographers. In the early 1960s, the family moved to Samoa, but returned to New Zealand when Percival was about three years old, settling in Thames. Percival was educated at Thames High School, and went on to study medicine at the University of Auckland, graduating MB ChB in 1983. She specialised in paediatric medicine and was admitted as a Fellow of the Royal Australasian College of Physicians in 1993.

Percival has three children, and is married to John McEnteer of Ngāti Maru.

== Career ==
Percival has been a consultant paediatrician in South Auckland since 1995, working at Middlemore Hospital and Kidz First Children's Hospital. In 1996, she was a foundation member of the Pacific Medical Association, and has served as the organisation's president. In 1999, Percival was one of the co-founders of South Seas Healthcare in South Auckland, which has grown to provide primary healthcare for over 120,000 people. She was the chair of South Seas Healthcare between 2014 and 2022.

Percival has lectured at the University of Auckland School of Medicine, and has headed the university's Pacific Health Unit. She has researched widely the health of Pacific children, including studying child malnutrition in Samoa, and the effects of climate change on the health of children in Tuvalu, Samoa, Niue and Tonga. She was head of the Pacific Child Health Indicator Project, which measured progress in child and maternal health in the Pacific islands, and was involved in the medical responses to the 2009 Samoa earthquake and tsunami, Cyclone Pam in Vanuatu in 2015, and the 2019 Samoa measles outbreak. Percival has established programmes to encourage healthy eating and address childhood obesity in South Auckland and was involved in the formation of Mana Kids clinics at 88 schools in the area. Notable doctoral students of Percival's include Julia Ioane.

From 2017 to 2019, Percival was a member of the World Health Organization's Emergency Medical Teams Maternal Newborn Child Health Technical Advisory Group. She was a board member of Health Promotion Agency between 2018 and 2022, and was chair of the Auckland District Health Board's Public Health Advisory Committee from 2020 to 2022.

== Honours and awards ==
In the 2010 Queen's Birthday Honours, Percival was made a Companion of the Queen's Service Order, for services to the Pacific Islands community. She was appointed a Dame Companion of the New Zealand Order of Merit, for services to health and the Pacific community, in the 2023 King's Birthday and Coronation Honours.
