= Fagamalo =

- Village
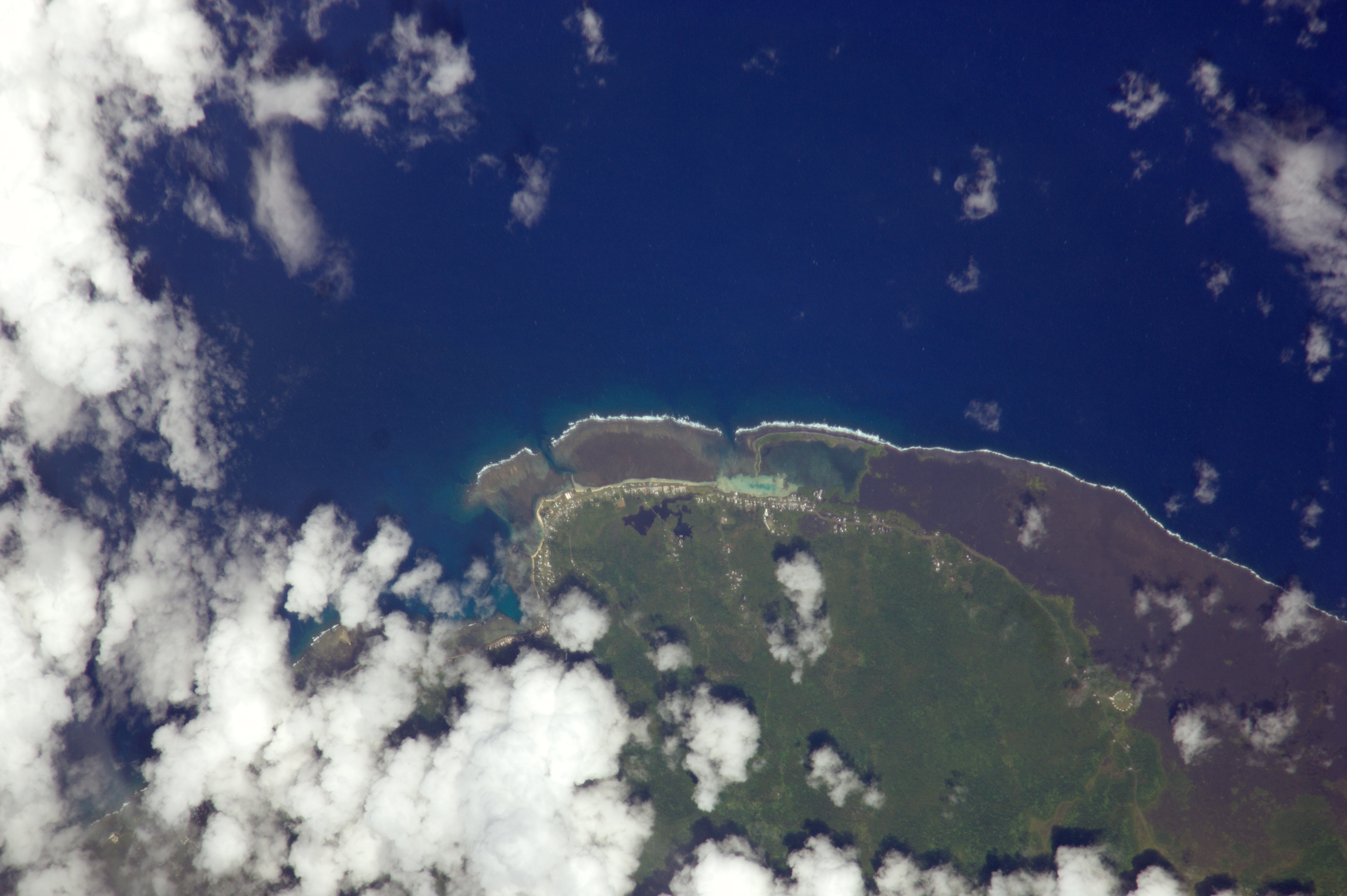
- Satellite image showing Fagamalo and neibouring villages with reefs off the coast and lava fields to the east in Saleaula, Mauga and Samalaeʻulu. (NASA photo)

- Location within Samoa
- Coordinates: 13°26′S 172°21′W
- Country: Samoa
- District: Gaga'emauga

Population (2016)
  - Total: 383
- Time zone: -11
- Climate: Af

Fagamalo is a village situated on the central north coast of Savai'i in Samoa. It is a sub-village or pito nu'u of the larger traditional village enclave of Matautu in the political district of Gaga'emauga. The population of the village is 383.

Fagamalo is by the sea at the northernmost point of Savai'i. There is a small post office and next door to it is a police station which services the local district. The Tutaga Primary School is at the east end of the village near where a hospital was situated. Cyclone Ofa (1990) and Cyclone Valerie (1991) caused a lot of damage on the north and west coast of Savai'i and destroyed the seaside Itu-o-Tane College in the village. The school was rebuilt inland in a neighbouring village. Five to ten minutes to the east of Fagamalo are the villages of Saleaula and Satoʻalepai. Towards the west are the villages of Safotu and Safune.

== Mythology ==
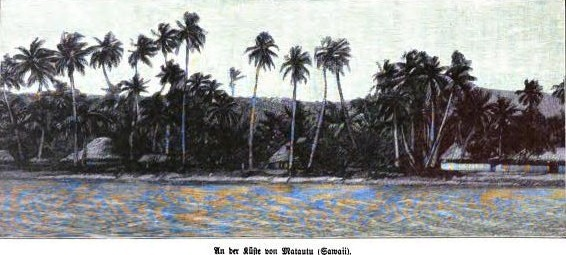
Matautu, 1902

In Samoan mythology, Fagamalo is the home of Tui Fiti, a spirit deity who resides in the sacred forest, vao sa, an area that is tapu in the village.

Fagamalo is in the traditional sub-district of Matautu, an area which took the lead in the attack during war. Matautu is also said to have been settled by Fijians or people from a place called Fiti. The name Matautu is traced back to a figure called Utu, whose father was called Lautalatoa from Fiti. Utu had a brother called Taua and a sister called Lenga. Taua went and settled further west at what is now called Sataua, and the sister Lega went to the south-west of the island to the place that is known today as Salega.

In 1978, the Governor-General of Fiji, Ratu Sir George Cakobau, arrived in Fagamalo during a state visit to Samoa. The High Chief of Fiji had requested a visit to Tui Fiti's sacred ground. An ancient kava ceremony was carried out in the village and Cakobau was given a chiefly title by the matai in recognition of the ancient connection with Fiji.

== Colonial era ==
During World War II, Fagamalo, which had a wharf and anchorage, was the main village and administrative centre on Savai'i and home for a resident commissioner of Allied forces defending the South Pacific against Japan. The government administration centre was later moved from Fagamalo to Tuasivi village on the north coast towards Salelologa township and ferry terminal.

== Proverbial Expressions ==
Samoan proverb originating from Matautu.

O faiva 'aulelei translates as Only a handsome man can do a thing well.

Some three generations ago the tulafale (orator chief) Nafo'i of Matautu, Savai'i, had guests. His young men prepared the food. When Nafo'i went into the cook-house to see how they were progressing, he noticed that they had not sufficiently pressed out the shredded coconut. So he applied himself to the job and did it right thoroughly. The others said, “Only a handsome man like Nafo'i is able to do a thing competently.”

== Recent era ==
More recently, in 2002, the small village made the headlines in New Zealand when the chiefs declared Fagamalo smokefree and imposed fines on people who broke the local law. Le Lagoto Resort is a local hotel on the beach in Fagamalo. The office for scuba diving company 'Dive Savai'i' is located across the road from the resort.

== Notes ==
- 2006 Samoa Population Census Retrieved 27 October 2009
