= Mauga, Samoa =

Mauga
- Village
- Location within Samoa
- Coordinates: 13°28′32″S 172°18′56″W
- Country: Samoa
- District: Gaga'emauga

Population (2016)
  - Total: 162
- Time zone: -11

Mauga is a village in Savai'i island in Samoa. The village is in the Gaga'emauga 1 constituency, a sub-division of the larger Gaga'emauga district. The population is 162.

The word mauga means mountain in the Samoan language. The settlement is built around the crater of a small volcano. Mauga is in the Gaga'emauga political district near the central north coast of the island. The large meeting houses of the village are situated in a circle facing each other around the rim of the crater which can be seen in high altitude photography.

The main island road passes by the village which is situated about a 40-minute drive north west from Salelologa township and ferry terminal. To the southeast is Samalaeʻulu village and to the west Saleaula where the main road cuts through large areas of black lava fields.

The physical setting of Gaga'emauga I district contains no development along its 10 km coastline, unlike the rest of the island, due to the barren lava cliffs by the sea. Lava from the island's interior flowed in a pathway between Mauga and Samalaeʻulu to the ocean, filling the lagoon. The lava fields resulted in the settlement moving inland. There are ruins of a historic Catholic mission site on the coast.
