= Saleaula =

Sale'aula
- Village
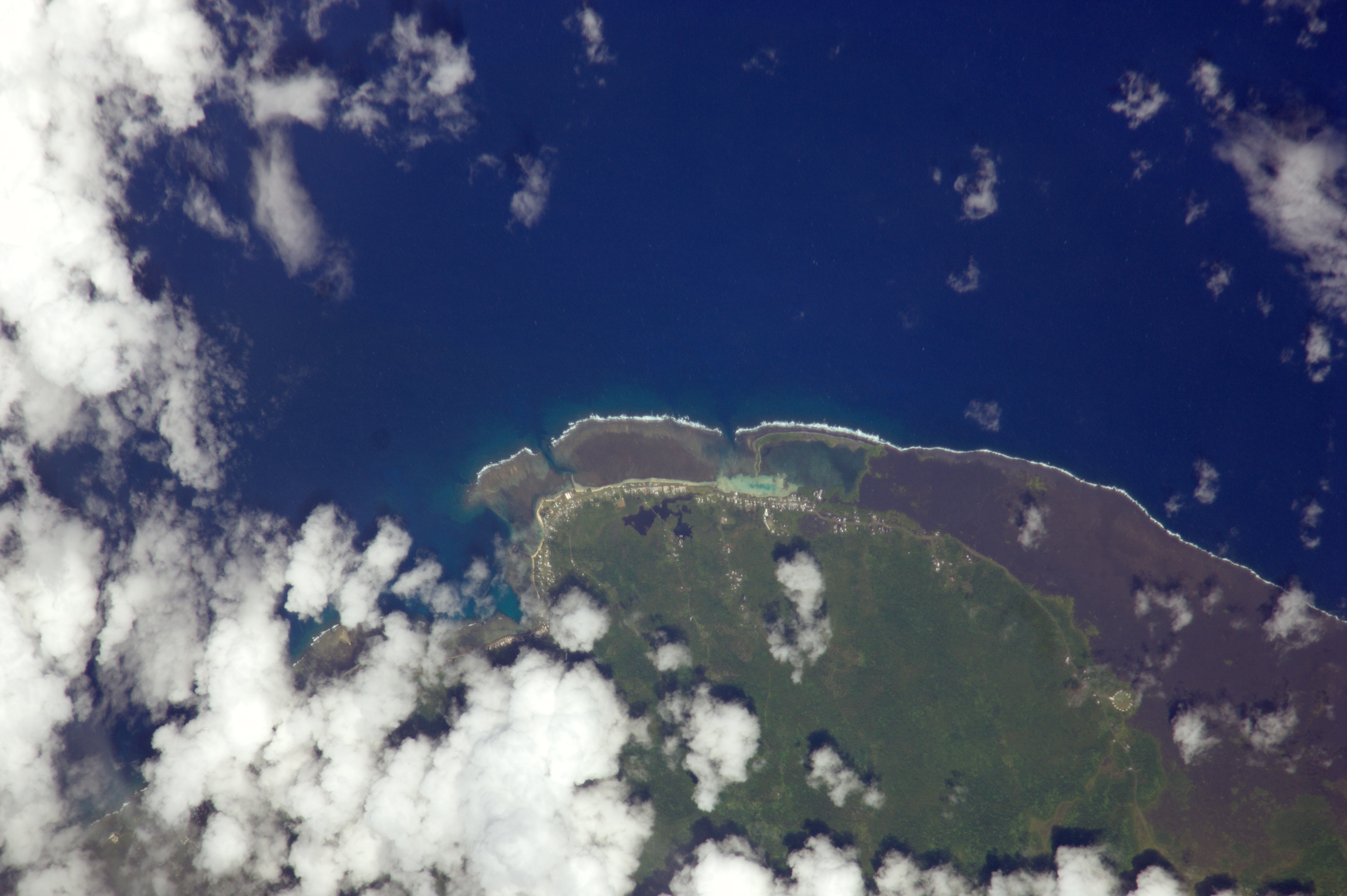
- Satellite image showing lava fields from Saleaula towards Mauga village to the east. (NASA photo, 2008)

- Location within Samoa
- Coordinates: 13°27′.31″S 172°20′.58″W
- Country: Samoa
- District: Gaga'emauga

Population (2016)
  - Total: 600
- Time zone: UTC-11 (Samoa Time Zone)

Sale'aula is a village on the central north coast of Savai'i island in Samoa and is the traditional center of the Gaga'emauga political district. Chief council meetings are held at Vaitu’utu’u malae in the village. The village has a population of 600.

== Volcanic eruptions ==
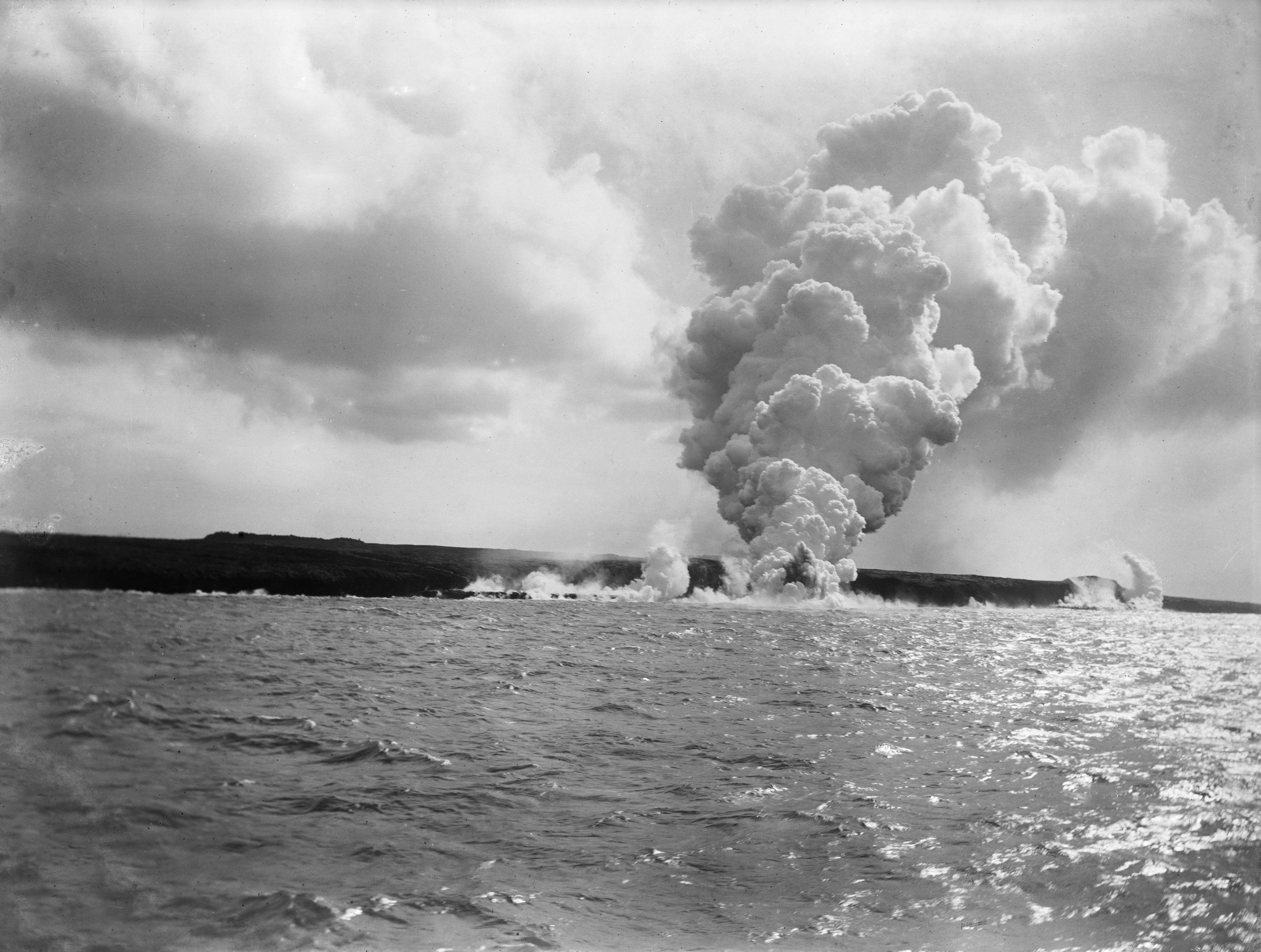
Eruption of Mt Matavanu, 1905. (photo by Thomas Andrew

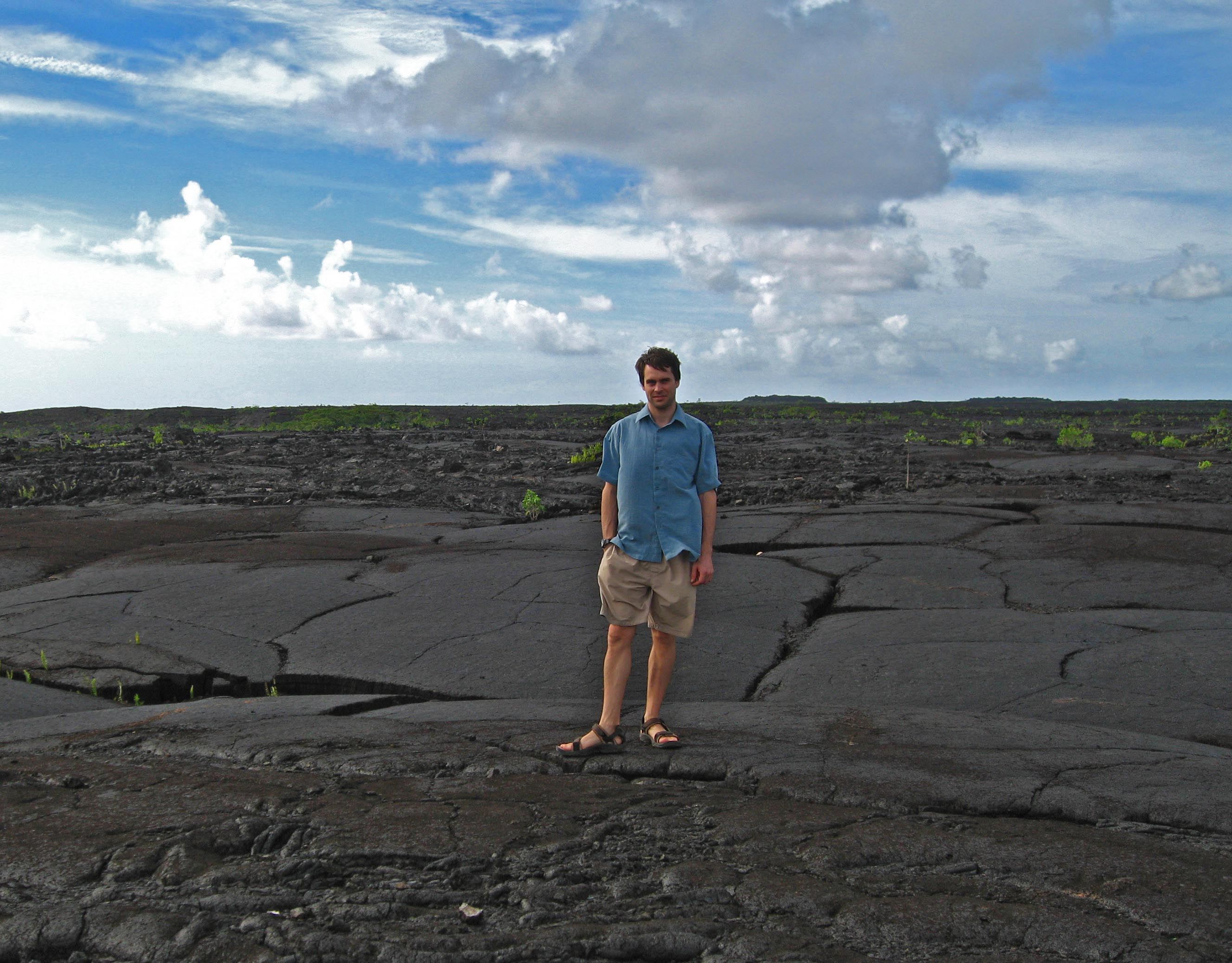
Lava fields on Savai'i.

Volcanic eruptions of Mt Matavanu (1905 - 1911) in central Savai'i swept northwards towards the coast and destroyed villages in its path.

The lava flowed over 40 square miles (100 km^{2}) of countryside to the sea and also destroyed another village Salago. The depth of the lava flow in some parts was 400 feet. A Catholic church and a meetinghouse of the LDS Church were also buried.

Sale'aula land was covered by lava that reached other villages to the east including Mauga and Samalaeʻulu.

The colonial German administration acquired land on the main island Upolu and resettled villagers at Salamumu and Leauva'a. Today, those villagers are still part of the Gaga'emauga electoral district on Savai'i.

Today, a few families have re-built homes upon the lava fields where there is sparse volcanic vegetation. There are some church ruins and the grave of a nun which was encircled by the lava flow. Local families provide fale accommodation for visitors and tourists by the lava and the coast.

== Origins ==
Samoa has different stories about the origins of different names and villages.

For the origin of Sale'aula village, one version tells of two brothers, Le'aula and Letufuga. Le'aula founded the village of Saleaula (Sa Le'aula, family of Le'aula), and Letufuga founded Safotulafai.
