= Satoʻalepai =

- Village
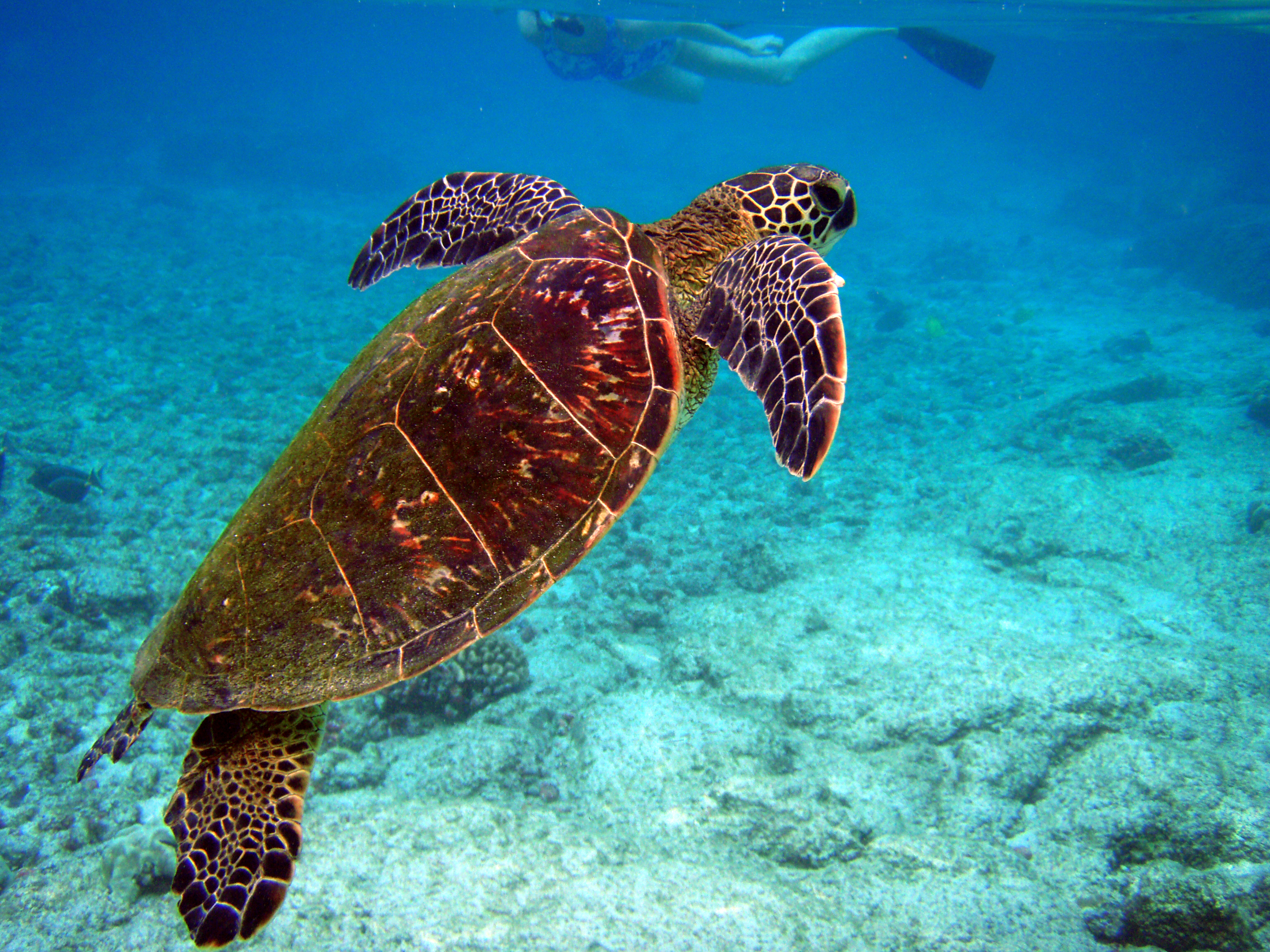

- Location within Samoa
- Coordinates: 13°26′36.28″S 172°20′51.64″W
- Country: Samoa
- District: Gagaʻemauga

Population (2016)
  - Total: 263
- Time zone: -11

Satoʻalepai is a village situated on the central north coast of the island of Savaiʻi in Samoa. Satoʻalepai is in the political district of Gagaʻemauga 2. The population is 263.

The village is by the sea with several small shops selling basic groceries. There are mangroves and wetlands inland, a short stroll from the main road circling Savaiʻi. Behind the village is an eco-tourism area in the wetlands with green turtles (Chelonia mydas) for visitors and tourists. The Satoʻalepai Wetland is listed as a Protected Area in the United Nations Environment Programme.

There is a turnoff inland to Tutaga Primary School at the west end of the village, on the boundary with neighbouring Fagamalo village. The closest hospital is at Safotu village, 15 minutes west on the main road.

Satoʻalepai is about 42 km from the ferry terminal and market at Salelologa on the east end of the island. Five minutes east of the village is Saleaula village and lava fields. Heading west on the main road, the next village is Fagamalo where there is a small post office and a police station next door. Manase, a popular tourist destination with beach fales is another five minutes past Fagamalo.
