= Gagaʻemauga =

Coordinates: 13°30′S 172°15′W

- District
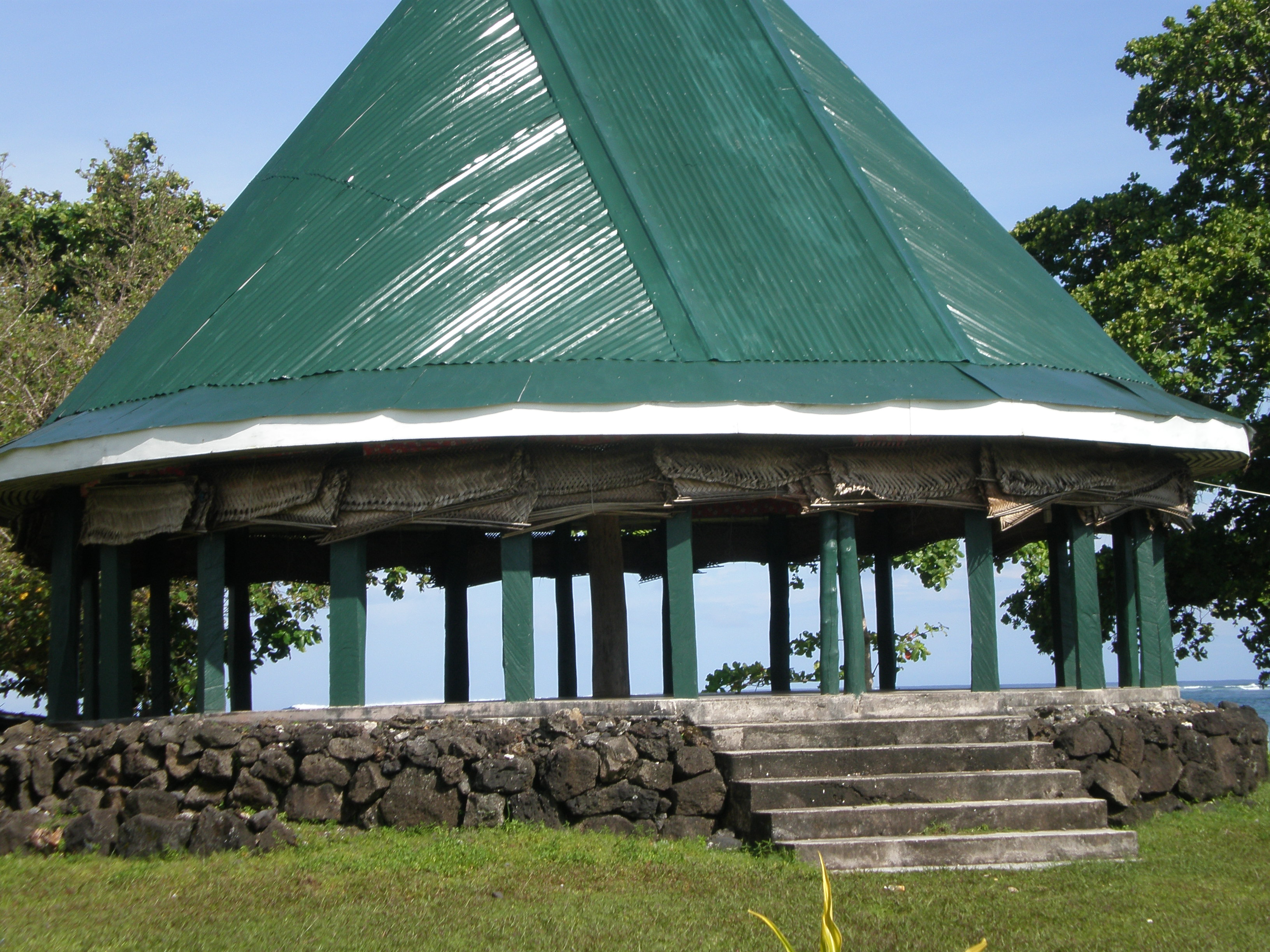
- Fale tele, meeting house, Lelepa village in Gagaʻemauga district. Architecture of Samoa dictate seating positions in cultural ceremony & ritual.

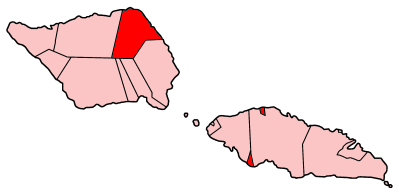
- Map of Samoa showing Gagaʻemauga district
- Country: Samoa

Population (2016)
  - Total: 7,840
- Time zone: -11

Gagaʻemauga is a district on the island of Savaiʻi in Samoa. The district is situated on the central north side of Savaiʻi. The name 'Gagaʻemauga' literally means "near side of the mountain", meaning the eastern side of the mountain chain running through the centre of Savaiʻi Island.

The traditional centre of the district is Saleaula, where the district chiefs (matai) and orators meet at Vaituʻutuʻu malae.

Like most villages in Samoa, the villages in Gagaʻemauga are situated by the sea although there are some settlements inland, including Patamea and Samalaeʻulu.

Reverend George Pratt (1817–1894), a missionary with the London Missionary Society, lived in Matautu (1839–1879) and authored the first grammar and dictionary of the Samoan language, "A Grammar and Dictionary of the Samoan Language, with English and Samoan Vocabulary", which was first printed in 1862 at the Samoa Mission Press.

The village of Saleaula maintains strong traditional connections with Safotulafai to the east, through the paramount chiefly title of Letufuga. Safotulafai is the capital of the political district Fa'asaleleaga.

== Exclaves on Upolu ==
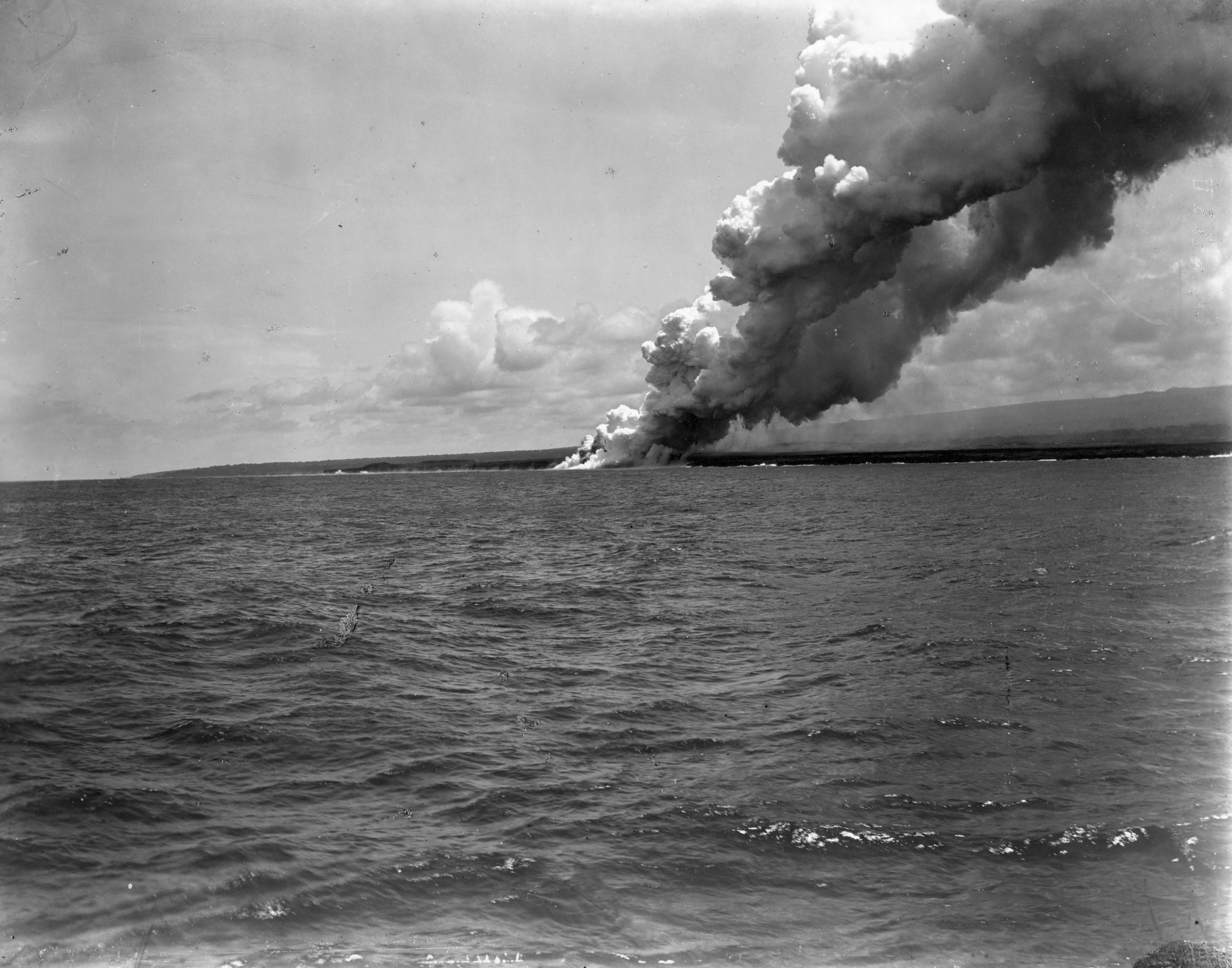
Mt Matavanu eruption, 1905. (photo by Alfred James Tattersall)

Two small exclaves of Gaga'emauga district are situated on the island of Upolu, following the resettlement of villages destroyed during volcanic eruptions of Mt Matavanu in the early 1900s. These exclaves are Le'auva'a and Salamumu villages which remain politically part of Savai'i despite their relocation.

== Volcanic eruptions 1900s ==
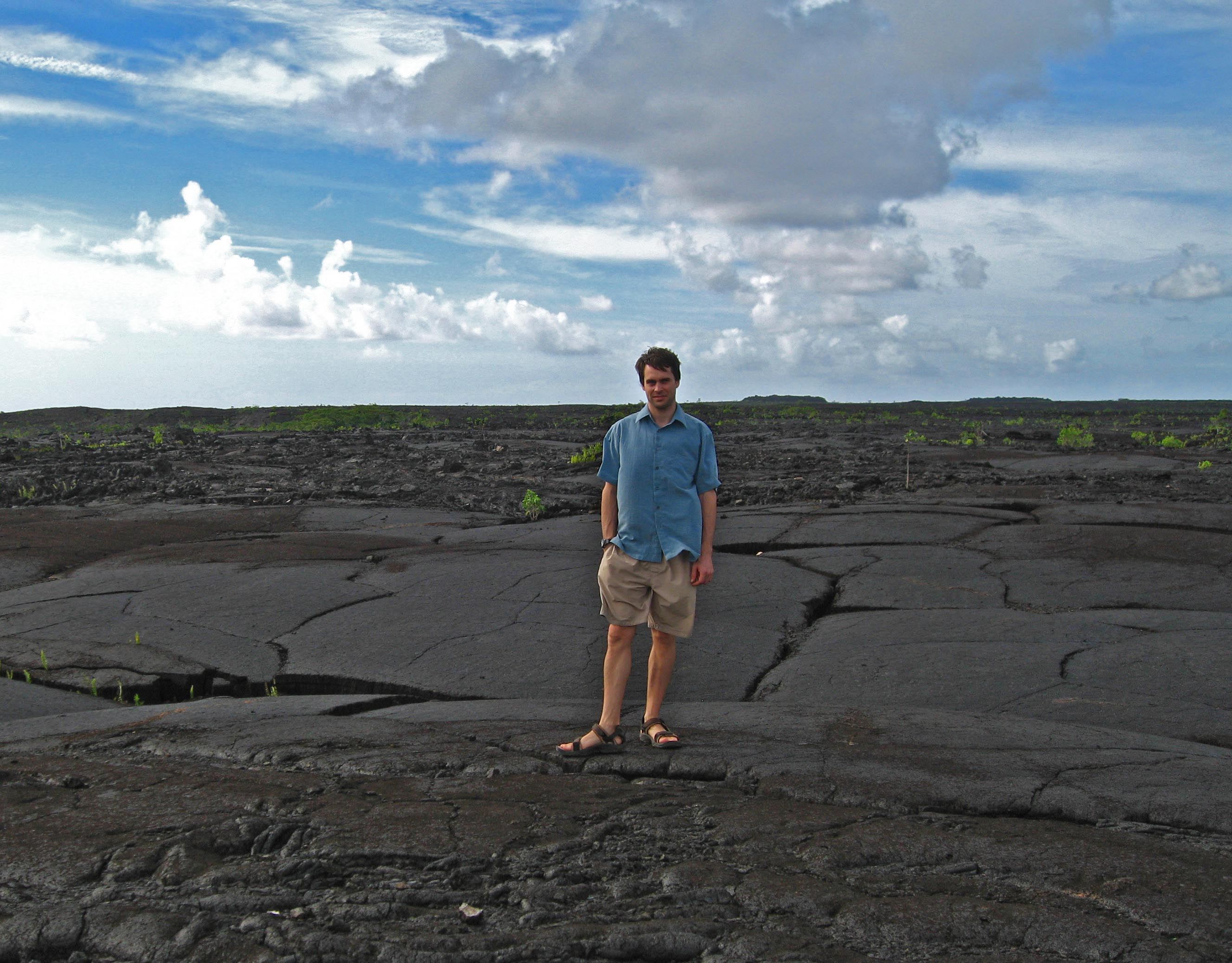
Lava fields on Savai'i.

The relocated villages of Gaga'emauga district on the main island Upolu was a result of 1905 - 1911 volcanic eruptions of Mt Matavanu, situated about 11 km inland from Matautu on the central north coast. Lava flows from eruptions destroyed villages in its path, including Saleaula and Salago villages, transforming the northern half of this district into lava fields which are still visible today, especially at Saleaula. The people of the affected areas were evacuated to Upolu, where they established the villages of Le'auva'a and Salamumu. Despite the move, they still retain their traditional links and fa'alupega (genealogy) affiliations to Gagaemauga. The names Leava'a and Salamumu denote the events of the 1905 Mt Matavanu eruption. In recent years, a few families have re-built houses on the lava fields where vegetation is still sparse.

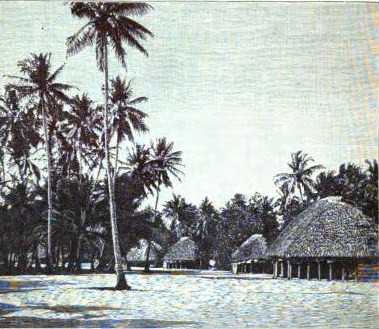
Matautu, 1902, Gaga'emauga district

== Itu o Tane ==
Gaga'emauga and the neighbouring political district Gagaifomauga are together referred to as Itu-o-Tane, 'The Side of Men.' The term Itu-o-Tane originates from the bravery of this north coast side in war, and in particular the 1830 war with A'ana. In contrast, part of the island's south coast is known as Itu-o-Fafine, 'The Side of Women.'

== Government administration ==
During World War II, the village of Fagamalo, a sub-village pito nu'u of the larger Matautu village, had a wharf and anchorage and was the main government administrative centre on Savai'i. Fagamalo was also the home of the colonial resident commissioner of Savai'i when Allied forces were defending the South Pacific against Japan. In modern times, the government administration on Savai'i has moved to Tuasivi in the Fa'asaleleaga district, where there is a hospital, a police station, and judicial court offices.

== Schools ==
- Vaipouli College

== See also ==
- List of schools in Savai'i
