= Samalaeʻulu =

Village on the northeast side of Savaiʻi island in Samoa

Coordinates: 13°30′10″S 172°18′00″W

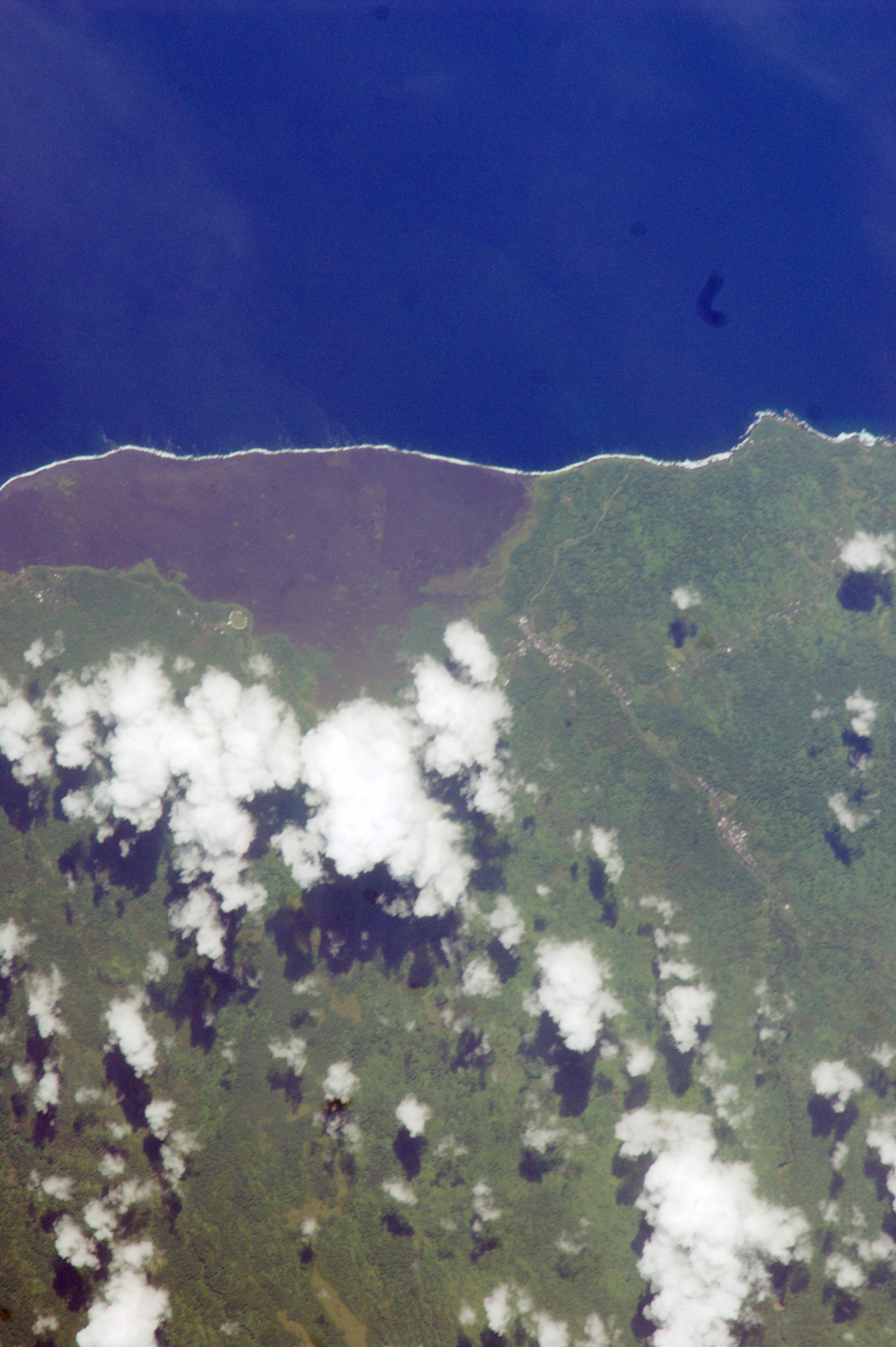
Samalaeʻulu inland and the south east of the black lava fields along the coastline. (NASA photo, 2009

Samalaeʻulu is a village on the northeast side of Savaiʻi island in Samoa. The village is situated on the main island highway about a 40-minutes drive north west from Salelologa ferry terminal and township and is part of the electoral constituency (Faipule District) of Gaga'emauga 1. The population is 1,054, making it one of the more populous villages in Savai'i.

The villages name sa malae ulu means "this place used to be dominated by breadfruit trees". During the volcanic eruption of Mt Matavanu (1905 - 1911), lava flowed between Samalae'ulu and Saleaula to the west, forcing villagers to move from the coast to its present inland location.
