= Pacific Squadron =

U.S. Naval unit (1821–1907)

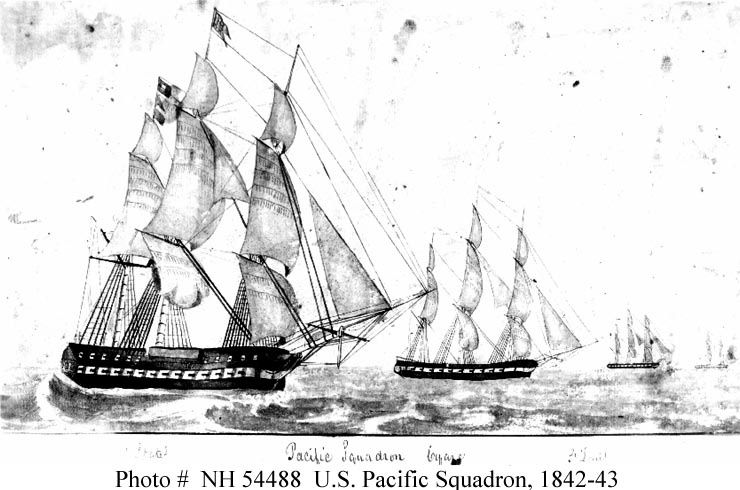
- Active: 1820-1910
- Country: United States of America
- Branch: United States Navy
- Type: Naval squadron

The Pacific Squadron of the United States Navy, established c. 1821 and disbanded in 1907, was a naval squadron stationed in the Pacific Ocean in the 19th and early 20th centuries.

Developing from a small force protecting United States commercial shipping interests in the Pacific waters off South America, North America and Hawaii, and initially lacking United States ports in the Pacific and operating out of storeships that provided naval supplies, while obtaining food and water from local ports of call in the Hawaiian Islands and towns on the Pacific Coast, the squadron eventually expanded its size and reach as US naval power and national interests grew in the 19th and 20th Centuries.

The small initial force expanded its scope of operations to include the Western Pacific in 1835, when the East India Squadron joined the force; by Mexican–American War period over one-half of the United States Navy was sent to join the Pacific Squadron. During the American Civil War, the squadron was reduced in size when its vessels were reassigned to Atlantic duty.

When the Civil War ended the squadron was reinforced again, until being disbanded just after the turn of the 20th century. The squadron was superseded by the establishment of the United States Pacific Fleet and the ships and personnel of the Pacific Squadron became the Pacific Fleet's Second Squadron.

== History ==
=== Formation ===
The "United States Naval Forces on Pacific Station" was established in 1818, with the USS Macedonian under John Downes setting sail to protect American interests in the Pacific Ocean. The Macedonian served in Chile until March 1821, when it was relieved by the USS Constellation under Charles G. Ridgely. These two single-frigate instances of the Pacific Station supported the Liberating Expedition of Peru in the Peruvian War of Independence.

Most historians consider the Pacific Squadron to have been officially established in 1821 with the first multiple-ship force in the Pacific Station. Charles Stewart set sail with the USS Franklin and USS Dolphin in September 1821 and arrived in April 1822 to relieve Ridgely.

This small force confined its activities initially to the Pacific waters off South America, North America and Hawaii protecting United States commercial shipping interests. It expanded its scope of operations to include the Western Pacific in 1835, when the East India Squadron joined the force. The squadron was reinforced when war with Mexico began to seem a possibility. Sailing from the east coast to the west coast around Cape Horn was a 13,000 miles (21,000 km) to 15,000 miles (24,000 km) journey that typically took from 130 to 210 days.

=== Sumatran Expeditions ===
The Pacific Squadron's First Sumatran Expedition conflict arose in February 1831. Off the coast of Sumatra on February 7, the American merchant vessel Friendship out of Salem was attacked by Malay natives described as "warrior pirates". The Americans were hoping to buy pepper from the natives but were instead attacked by three small vessels. Three men aboard Friendship were killed, one of whom was the First Mate; the remaining crew members abandoned their vessel and it was captured. The passing Dutch schooner Dolfijn made a failed attempt to rescue the ship—the Anglo-Dutch Treaty of 1824 obligated the Dutch to ensure the safety of shipping and overland trade in and around Aceh, and precipitated the Dutch expedition on the west coast of Sumatra later that year. The surviving sailors escaped to a friendly port nearby with the help of a friendly Malay tribal chief, and then obtained the assistance of other American merchantmen to retake the plundered ship. Captain Endecott returned the ship to Salem July 16, 1831. President Andrew Jackson received word of the 'massacre' and ordered Commodore John Downes in USS Potomac to punish the natives for their acts of piracy.

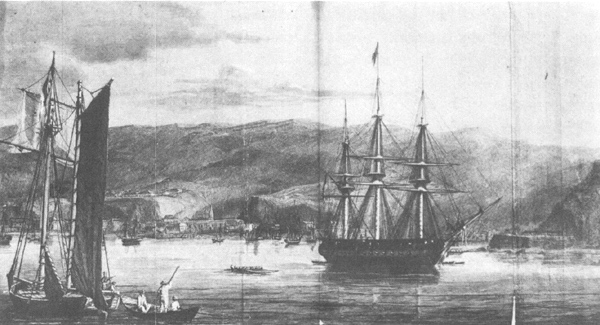
USS Potomac

Arriving off Sumatra exactly a year after the Friendship incident, Commodore Downes with just under 300 bluejackets and marines aboard the frigate, attacked Quallah Battoo, the main village of the hostile Malays. The men went ashore in launches during which a small naval engagement was fought. A few of the boats were armed with a light cannon and were ordered to sink three small pirate craft in the port. The launches achieved their goal and then proceeded in assisting USS Potomac in shelling five enemy citadels. The five forts were attacked by land as well and all were eventually suppressed. Hundreds of matchlock armed natives were killed with a loss of only two Americans. After the battle, Downes warned that if any more American merchant ships were attacked, another expedition would be launched in reprisal.

The mission was technically a success for six years until 1838 when the Malays attacked and plundered a second American merchantman. In response, the Second Sumatran Expedition was launched by ships of the East India Squadron, which had just joined the United States Exploring Expedition for circumnavigation of the globe, but were able to bombard Quallah Battoo and engage in the battle of Muckie without making a detour.

=== Capture of Monterey ===
In 1842 the Pacific Squadron commander Commodore Thomas ap Catesby Jones received false information that war had begun between the United States and Mexico and that the British ship HMS Dublin was cruising off California to take control of the Mexican state. In response Commodore Jones in his frigate USS United States and with the sloops USS Dale and USS Cyane sailed for California's capital, Monterey. They arrived on 19 October 1842 and took control of the city without bloodshed before returning it to the Mexicans on 21 October when Jones discovered that war had not actually been declared.

=== Mexican–American War ===
==== California Campaign ====
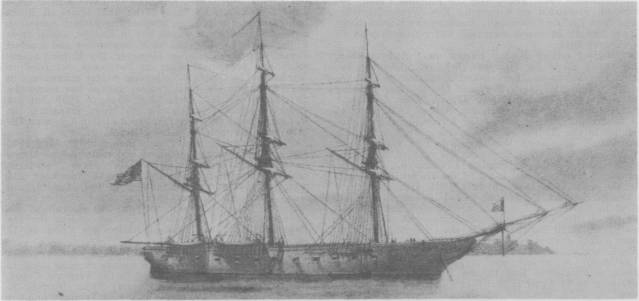
USS Savannah

The Pacific Squadron was instrumental in the capture of Alta California in the Mexican–American War of 1846 to 1848. In the conflict's early months after war was declared on 24 April 1846, the American navy with its force of 350–400 marines and bluejacket sailors on board several ships near California were essentially the only significant United States military force on the Pacific coast. Marines were stationed aboard each warship to assist in close-quarters, ship to ship combat and to serve as both ship-board guards and the primary component of boarding or landing parties; they could also be detached for extended service on land. In actual practice, some sailors on each ship were detached from each vessel to supplement the marine force, although rarely more than would compromise a ship's ability to remain functional. The Pacific Squadron had orders, in the event of war with Mexico, to seize the ports in Mexican California and elsewhere along the Pacific Coast.

The only other United States force in California was a sixty-two man "mapping" expedition which had entered California in late 1845 under the command of U.S. Army Brevet Captain John C. Frémont. They had been dispatched under the auspices of the Corps of Topographical Engineers. Frémont, the son-in-law of expansionist U.S. Senator Thomas Hart Benton, had acted provocatively with California's Mexican government, and sustained a shadowy relationship with the American emigrants who began the Bear Flag Revolt on June 10, 1846 by stealing government horses they feared would be used against them. On 5 July Frémont proposed to the American insurgents that they unite with his party and become a single military group under his command. A compact was drawn up which all volunteers of the California Battalion signed or made their mark.

Under John D. Sloat, Commodore of the Pacific Squadron, USS Savannah with Cyane and USS Levant captured the Alta California capital city of Monterey, California on 7 July 1846. Two days later on 9 July, USS Portsmouth, under Captain John S. Montgomery, landed seventy marines and bluejacket sailors at Clark's Point in San Francisco Bay and captured Yerba Buena, which is today's San Francisco, without firing a shot. On 11 July the British Royal Navy sloop HMS Juno entered San Francisco Bay, causing Montgomery to alert his defenses. The large British ship, the 2,600-ton man-of-war HMS Collingwood, flagship of Pacific Station Commander-in-Chief Sir George S. Seymour, also showed up about this time outside Monterey Harbor. Both British ships observed, but did not enter the conflict.

Commodore Robert F. Stockton took over as the senior United States military commander in California in late July 1846; his flagship was the frigate USS Congress. Stockton accepted the California Battalion under Fremont's command to help secure Southern California. The battalion left for San Diego on Cyane on 26 July. Most towns surrendered without a shot being fired. Fremont's California Battalion members were sworn in and the volunteers paid the regular United States Army salary of $25.00 a month for privates with higher pay for officers. The California Battalion varied in size with time from about 160 initially to over 450 by January 1847. Pacific Squadron war ships and storeships served as floating store houses keeping Fremont's volunteer force in the California Battalion supplied with black powder, lead shot and supplies as well as transporting them to different California ports. Cyane transported Fremont and about 160 of his men to the small port of San Diego which was captured on 29 July 1846 without a shot being fired.

Leaving about forty men to garrison San Diego, Fremont continued on to the Pueblo de Los Angeles where on 13 August, with the United States Navy band playing and colors flying, the combined forces of Stockton and Frémont entered the town without a man killed or gun fired. United States Marine Major Archibald Gillespie, Fremont's second in command, was appointed military commander of Los Angeles, the largest settlement in Alta California with about 1,500 residents. Gillespie had an inadequate force of from thirty to fifty troops stationed there to keep order and garrison the city. Congress is credited with capturing the Los Angeles harbor and port at San Pedro Bay on 6 August 1846. Congress later helped capture Mazatlan, Mexico on 11 November 1847.

The revolt of about 100 Californios in Los Angeles forced Gillespie and his troops departure on about 24 September 1847. Commodore Stockton used about 360 marines and bluejacket sailors with four field pieces from Congress in a joint operation with the approximate seventy cavalry troops supplied by United States Army Brigadier General Stephen W. Kearny, who had arrived from New Mexico, and part of Fremont's California Battalion of about 450 men to retake Los Angeles on 10 January 1847. The result of this Battle of Providencia was the Californios signing the Treaty of Cahuenga on 13 January 1847 – terminating the warfare and disbanding the Californio troops in Alta California. On January 16, 1847, Commodore Stockton appointed Frémont military governor of U.S. territorial California – a move later contested by General Kearny.

The retired ship of the line USS Independence was brought back into service, cut down and recommissioned as a razee frigate in 1846. The newly reconfigured ship removed the old top deck and reduced the gun count from ninety to fifty-four making her less well gunned but much easier to sail. The rebuilt Independence, now classified as a heavy frigate, launched on 4 August 1846 when the nation was already at war with Mexico and departed Boston 29 August 1846 for California. She entered Monterey Bay on 22 January 1847 after a fast 146-day trip around Cape Horn and became the flagship of Commodore William Shubrick, now commanding the Pacific Squadron.

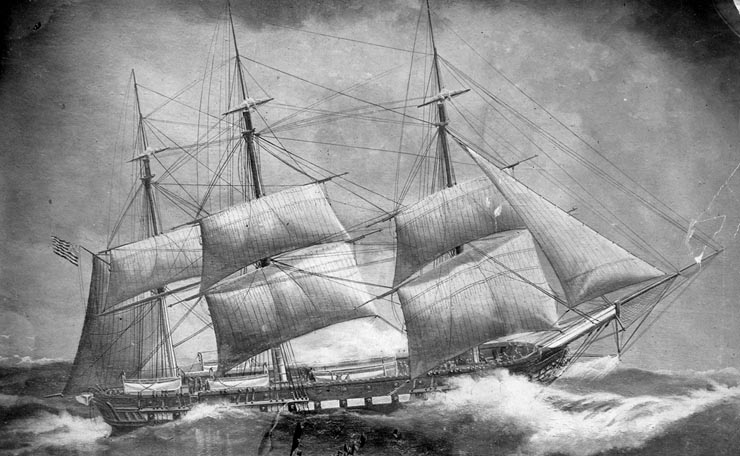
USS Congress

In July 1846, Colonel Jonathan D. Stevenson of New York was asked to raise a volunteer regiment of ten companies of seventy-seven men each to go to California with the understanding that they would be muster out and stay in California. They were designated the 1st Regiment of New York Volunteers and fought in the California Campaign and the Pacific Coast Campaign. In August and September the regiment trained and prepared for the trip to California. Three private merchant ships, Thomas H Perkins, Loo Choo, and Susan Drew, were chartered, and the sloop USS Preble was assigned convoy detail. On 26 September the four ships left New York for California. Fifty men who had been left behind for various reasons sailed on 13 November 1846 on the small storeship USS Brutus. Susan Drew and Loo Choo reached Valparaíso, Chile by 20 January 1847 and after getting fresh supplies, water and wood were on their way again by 23 January. Thomas H Perkins did not stop until San Francisco, reaching port on 6 March 1847. Susan Drew arrived on 20 March 1847 and Loo Choo arrived on 26 March 1847, 183 days after leaving New York. Brutus finally arrived on 17 April 1847.

After desertions and deaths in transit the four ships brought 648 men to California. The companies were then deployed throughout Upper-Alta and Lower-Baja California from San Francisco to La Paz, Mexico. The ship Isabella sailed from Philadelphia on 16 August 1847, with a detachment of one hundred soldiers, and arrived in California on 18 February 1847, the following year, at about the same time that the ship Sweden arrived with another detachment of soldiers. These soldiers were added to the existing companies of Jonathan D. Stevenson's 1st Regiment of New York Volunteers. These troops essentially took over all of the Pacific Squadron's on-shore military and garrison duties and the California Battalion and Mormon Battalion's garrison duties as well as some Baja California duties.

==== Pacific Coast Campaign ====
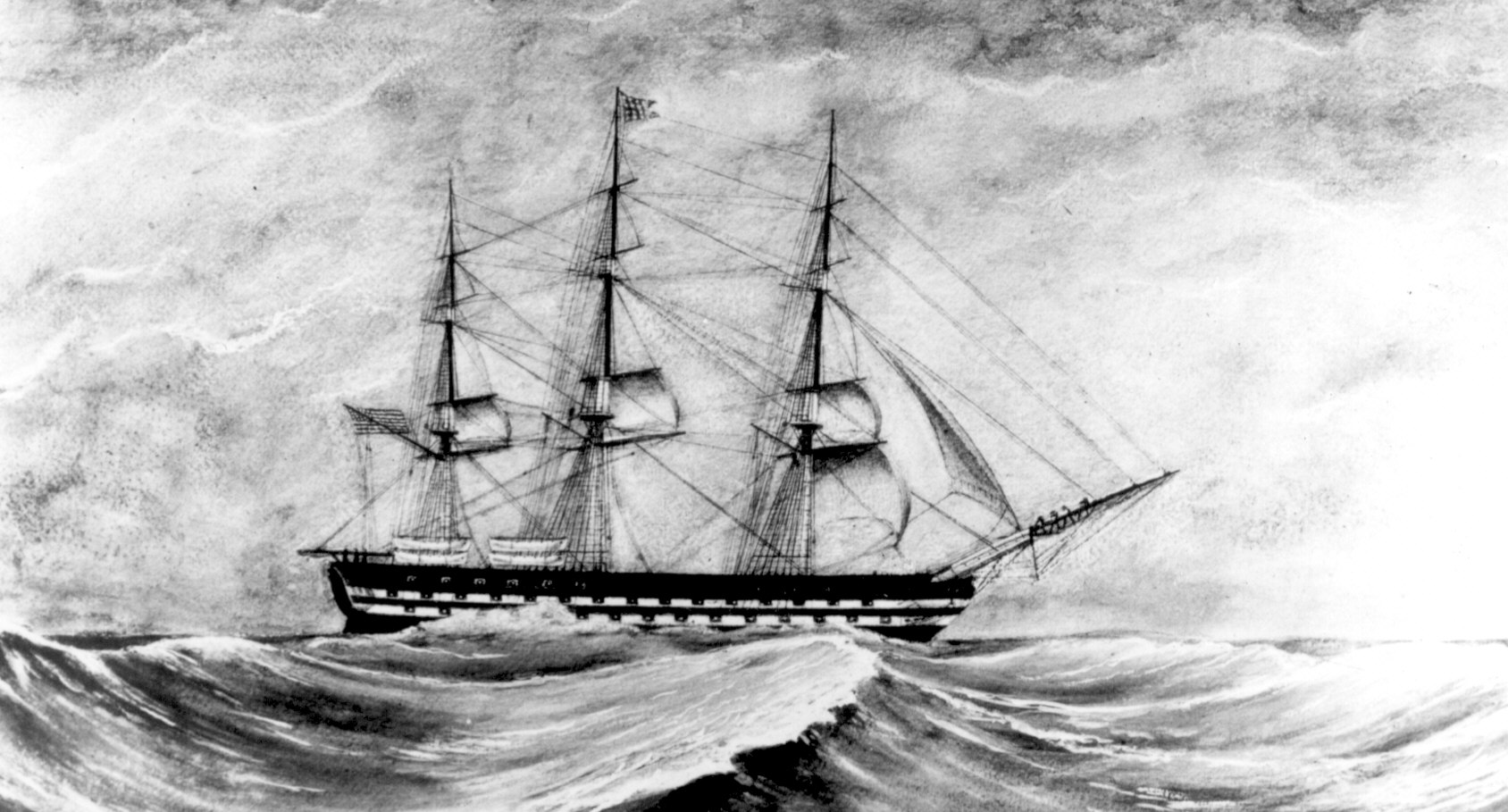
USS Independence

After Alta California was secured most of the squadron proceeded down the Pacific coast capturing all major Baja California Peninsula cities and capturing or destroying nearly all Mexican vessels in the Gulf of California. Other mainland ports, not on the peninsula, were taken as well. The objective of the campaign was to take Mazatlan, a major supply base for Mexican forces. Cyane was given credit for eighteen captures and numerous destroyed ships. Entering the Gulf of California, Independence, Congress and Cyane seized La Paz on the Baja California Peninsula, and captured and or burned the small Mexican fleet at Guaymas across the Gulf on the mainland. Within a month, they cleared the Gulf of hostile ships, destroying or capturing thirty vessels. Later on their sailors and marines captured the town of Mazatlan, Mexico, on 11 November 1847. A Mexican campaign to retake the various captured ports resulted in several small battles and at least two sieges occurred in which the Pacific Squadron ships provided support. Cyane returned to Norfolk on 9 October 1848 to receive the congratulations of the Secretary of the Navy for her significant contributions to American victories in Mexico. Other ships headed home too. The Treaty of Guadalupe Hidalgo, signed in February 1848 and its subsequent ratification by the United States and Mexican legislatures, marked the end of the Mexican–American War.

=== American Civil War ===
The extent of the Pacific Squadron's responsibility was further enlarged in the 1850s when California and Oregon were admitted as U.S. states and Navy bases on the west coast were established. The U.S. Sailing Navy's use of sailing ships declined as armored steamships were introduced before the American Civil War. The Pacific Squadron was far removed from the fighting during the conflict though some vessels of the squadron were reassigned to duty in the Atlantic and fought in engagements such as the Battle of Forts Jackson and St. Philip.

=== Anti-Piracy operations ===
In July 1870 the pirate ship Forward attacked and captured the Mexican port city of Guaymas, Sonora in the Gulf of California. There the pirates robbed the foreign residents and persuaded by force the United States Consulate to supply Forward with coal, then the pirates sailed south for Boca Teacapan, Sinaloa. The Pacific Squadron, with Rear Admiral Shubrick, was informed of the incident so USS Mohican was sent to destroy the pirate threat. After arriving in the area in early August, Mohican's men discovered that Forward was at Boca Teacapan's harbor in the Teacapan River. A boat expedition was launched and attacked the pirate ship on 17 August 1870. The battle ended with an American victory and the burning and sinking of the pirate steamer.

=== Oahu Expedition ===
An American expedition to Oahu occurred in late 1873 to early 1874. The Pacific Squadron sloops USS Tuscarora and USS Portsmouth, under Lieutenant Commander Theodore F. Jewell, set sail to open negotiations with King Lunalilo about the duty-free exportation of sugar from the island to America. However, during the proceedings, Lunalilo died on February 3 of 1874 which suspended negotiations until the electoral process was completed. The wife of the king, Queen Emma ran against the future King Kalakaua and when he won she was very upset and decided to lead an armed mob in an attack on the representatives in Honolulu courthouse. As result 150 sailors and marines were landed from the American ships plus another seventy to eighty from the British sloop HMS Tenedos. The riot was mostly quelled by nightfall but an occupation lasted until February 20 by which time negotiations regarding sugar were concluded, the king also allowed the Americans to build their first repair and coaling station in Pearl Harbor.

=== Second Samoan Civil War ===
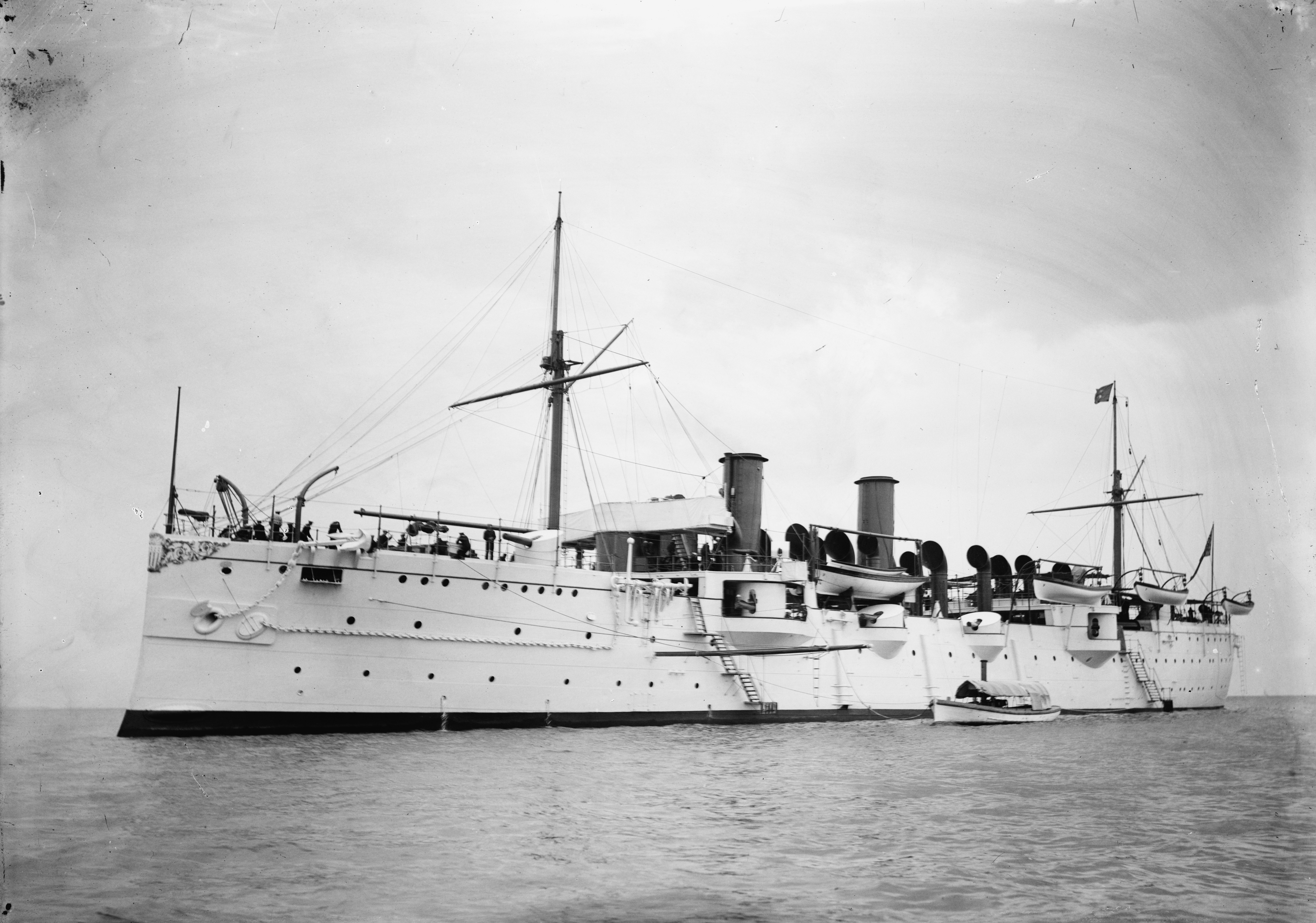
USS Philadelphia

In 1899 another civil war broke out in Samoa between rebels loyal to the Mata'afa Iosefo and federal forces of Malietoa Tanumafili I. Pacific Squadron Rear Admiral Albert Kautz in USS Philadelphia launched an expedition to the island and occupied the capital of Apia on March 14, 1899 after a battle and bombardment at the port city. From there American, British and Samoan forces engaged in several actions against the rebels over the course of a few months. When the conflict ended the United States gained control of eastern Samoa which is today's American Samoa and the western half of the archipelago was taken by Germany, creating the short lived German Samoa that was conquered during World War I.

=== Disbandment ===
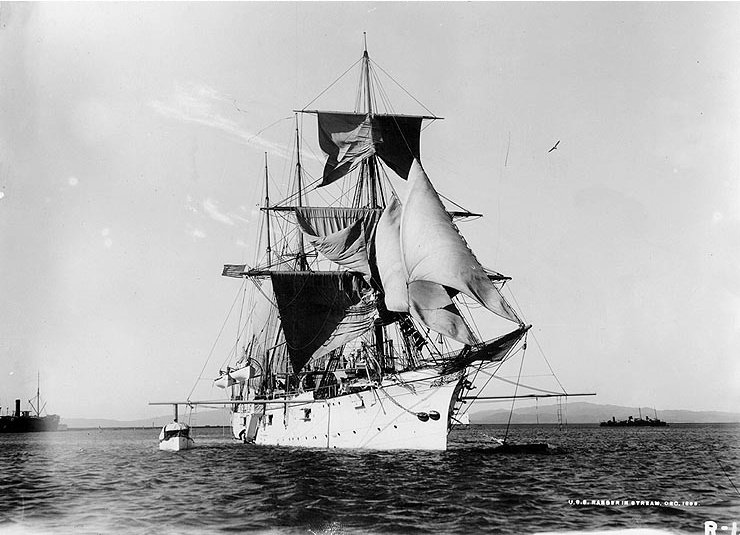
USS Ranger

In 1903, the Pacific Squadron consisted of the armored cruiser USS New York, the protected cruiser USS Boston, the unprotected cruiser USS Marblehead, and the gunboat Ranger.

In early 1907, the U.S. Navy abolished both the Pacific Squadron and the United States Asiatic Fleet and established the new United States Pacific Fleet. The ships and personnel of the Asiatic Fleet became the First Squadron of the Pacific Fleet, while the ships and personnel of the Pacific Squadron became the Pacific Fleet's Second Squadron.

== Commanders-in-Chief ==
Pacific Squadron

- Captain John Downes 1818–1820
- Captain Charles Goodwin Ridgely 1820–1821
- Commodore Charles Stewart 1821–1823
- Commodore Isaac Hull 1823–1827
- Commodore Jacob Jones 1826–1829
- Commodore Charles C. B. Thompson 1829–1831
- Commodore Francis H. Gregory 1831–1832
- Commodore John Downes 1832–1834
- Commodore Alexander Scammel Wadsworth 1834–1836
- Commodore Henry E. Ballard 1837–1839
- Commodore Alexander Claxton 1839–1841
- Captain Daniel Turner 7 Feb 1841 - 30 Dec 1841
- Commodore Thomas ap Catesby Jones 30 Dec 1841 – 8 May 1843
- Commodore Alexander J. Dallas 30 May 1843 – 3 Jun 1844
- Captain James Armstrong 8 Jun 1844 - 17 Feb 1845
- Commodore John Drake Sloat 16 Oct 1844 – 23 Oct 1846
- Commodore Robert Field Stockton 15 Jul 1846 - 2 Mar 1847
- Commodore James Biddle 2 Mar 1847 – 19 Jul 1847
- Commodore W. Branford Shubrick 19 Jul 1847 – 10 Aug 1848
- Commodore Thomas ap Catesby Jones 4 Nov 1848 – 26 Aug 1850
- Commodore Charles S. McCauley 24 Jun 1850 – 23 Jan 1853
- Commodore Bladen Dulany 19 Nov 1852 – 22 Apr 1855
- Commodore William Mervine Sep 1855 – 16 Nov 1857
- Commodore John C. Long 24 Sep 1857 – 16 Aug 1859
- Commodore John B. Montgomery 12 May 1859 – 2 Jan 1862
- Acting Rear Admiral Charles H. Bell 2 Jan 1862 – 25 Oct 1864
- Rear Admiral George F. Pearson, 25 Oct 1864 – 16 Jun 1866

North Pacific Squadron 1866–1878

- Rear Admiral Henry K. Thatcher 26 May 1866 – 7 Aug 1868
- Rear Admiral Thomas T. Craven 6 Aug 1868 – 25 Jun 1869
- Rear Admiral William Rogers Taylor 22 Jul 1869 - 16 Oct 1870 (North Squadron Pacific Fleet)
- Rear Admiral Roger N. Stembel 20 May 1871 - 27 Mar 1872 (North Pacific Station)
- Rear Admiral Alexander M. Pennock 23 Sep 1872 - 27 Apr 1874 (North Pacific Station)
- Rear Admiral John J. Almy 1 Jun 1874 - 30 Jun 1876 (North Pacific Station)
- Rear Admiral Alexander Murray 3 Jul 1876 - 30 Apr 1878 (North Pacific Station)

South Pacific Squadron 1866–1878

- Rear Admiral George F. Pearson, 16 Jun 1866 – 25 Dec 1866
- Rear Admiral John A. B. Dahlgren 25 Dec 1866 – 14 Jul 1868
- Rear Admiral Thomas Turner 14 Jul 1868 – 27 May 1869
- Rear Admiral Thomas Turner 27 May 1869 - 1870 (South Squadron Pacific Fleet)
- Commodore David S. McDougal 8 Aug 1870 - 27 Sep 1871 (South Squadron Pacific Fleet)
- Rear Admiral James W. Nicholson 1871 - 1872 (South Squadron Pacific Fleet)
- Commodore Roger N. Stembel 10 May 1872 - 13 Aug 1872 (South Squadron Pacific Fleet)
- Commodore Roger N. Stembel 20 Aug 1872 - 10 Oct 1872 (South Pacific Station)
- Rear Admiral Charles Steedman 10 Oct 1872 - 22 Sep 1873 (South Pacific Station)
- Rear Admiral John J. Almy 22 Sep 1873 - 18 May 1874 (South Pacific Station)
- Rear Admiral Napoleon Collins 11 Aug 1874 - 9 Aug 1875 (South Pacific Station)
- Commodore Edward Simpson 27 Aug 1875 - 16 Sep 1875 (South Pacific Station)
- Rear Admiral Reed Werden 9 Sep 1875 - 12 Jul 1876 (South Pacific Station)
- Rear Admiral George H. Preble 12 Feb 1876 - 19 Apr 1878 (South Pacific Station)

Pacific Fleet 1870–1878

- Rear Admiral John Ancrum Winslow 1870 – 1872
- Rear Admiral John J. Almy 22 Sep 1873 – Jul 1876
- Rear Admiral C. H. B. Caldwell 23 Jun 1876 - 11 Sep 1876
- Rear Admiral Edward Donaldson 21 Sep 1876 -

Pacific Squadron 1878–1907

- Rear Admiral Christopher Raymond Perry Rodgers 9 Jun 1878 – 1 Oct 1880
- Rear Admiral Thomas H. Stevens 1 Oct 1880 – 3 Jun 1881
- Rear Admiral George Balch 18 Jul 1881 – 1 Jan 1883
- Rear Admiral Aaron K. Hughes 3 Jan 1883 – 31 Mar 1884
- Rear Admiral John Henry Upshur 8 Apr 1884 – 29 May 1885
- Rear Admiral Edward Y. McCauley 28 May 1885 – 6 Nov 1886
- Rear Admiral Lewis Kimberly 25 Jan 1887 – Mar 1890
- Commodore George Brown, Jan 1890 – 9 Jan 1893
- Commodore Joseph S. Skerrett, 10 Jan 1893 – 6 Nov 1893
- Rear Admiral John Irwin, 6 Nov 1893 – 15 Apr 1894
- Rear Admiral John G. Walker, 15 Apr 1894 – Aug 1894
- Rear Admiral Lester A. Beardslee, Aug 1894 – Aug 1897
- Rear Admiral Joseph N. Miller, Aug 1897 – 22 Nov 1898
- Rear Admiral Albert Kautz, 15 Oct 1898 – 28 Jan 1901
- Rear Admiral Silas Casey III 28 Jan 1901 – 4 Feb 1903
- Rear Admiral Henry Glass 4 Feb 1903 – Mar 1905
- Rear Admiral Caspar Frederick Goodrich Mar 1905 – 31 May 1906
- Rear Admiral William T. Swinburne 31 May 1906 – 22 Jul 1907

== Ships ==
1845–1849

- Independence, frigate (razee); 54 guns, ~500 crew,
- Congress, frigate; 44 guns, 480 crew
- Savannah, frigate; 44 guns, 480 crew
- Columbus, ship of the line; 74 guns, 780 crew
- Portsmouth, sloop; 20 guns, 200 crew
- Cyane, sloop; 20 guns, 200 crew
- Levant, sloop; 20 guns, 200 crew
- Preble, sloop; 16 guns, 150 crew – Stevenson's convoy escort
- Dale, sloop, 16 guns, 150 crew
- Erie, storeship (bark); 4 guns, ukn crew
- Relief, storeship; 408 tons, 6 guns, ukn crew
- Warren, storeship (sloop); 691 tons, 18 guns, ukn crew
- Brutus, storeship – for Stevenson's regiment, chartered?
- Libertad, Schooner; ukn guns, ~20 crew
- plus other ships captured during the war against Mexico

1851

- Savannah, frigate; 44 guns, 480 crew
- Raritan, frigate; 44 guns, 480 crew
- Falmouth, sloop; 20 guns, 200 crew
- St. Mary's, sloop; 20 guns, 200 crew
- Vandalia, sloop; 20 guns, 200 crew
- Vincennes, sloop; 20 guns, 200 crew
- Warren, storeship (sloop); 20 guns, 200 crew
- Lexington, storeship
- Southampton, storeship
- Supply, storeship
- Massachusetts, steamer

1861–1865

1861

- Lancaster, screw sloop-of-war, 24 × 9 in (230 mm) smoothbore Dahlgren guns, 1 × 2 in (51 mm) smoothbore Dahlgren gun, 2 × 30-pounder Parrott rifles, 367 men
- Saranac, side wheel steam sloop-of-war, 9 × 8-inch guns, complement unknown
- Wyoming, screw sloop-of-war, 2 × 11 in (280 mm) smoothbore Dahlgren guns, 1 × 60-pounder Parrott rifle, 3 × 32-pounder guns, 198 men
- Narragansett, 2nd class screw sloop-of-war, 1 × 11 in (280 mm) gun, 4 × 32-pounder guns, 50 men
- St. Mary's, sloop of war, 16 × 32-pounder guns, 6 × 8 in (200 mm) guns, 195 men
- Cyane, sloop 20 guns, 200 crew
- Camanche, Passaic-class monitor, 2 × 15 inch smoothbore cannons, 76 men
- Shubrick, lighthouse tender steamer

== See also ==
- History of the United States Navy
