= List of colonial governors of the Marshall Islands =

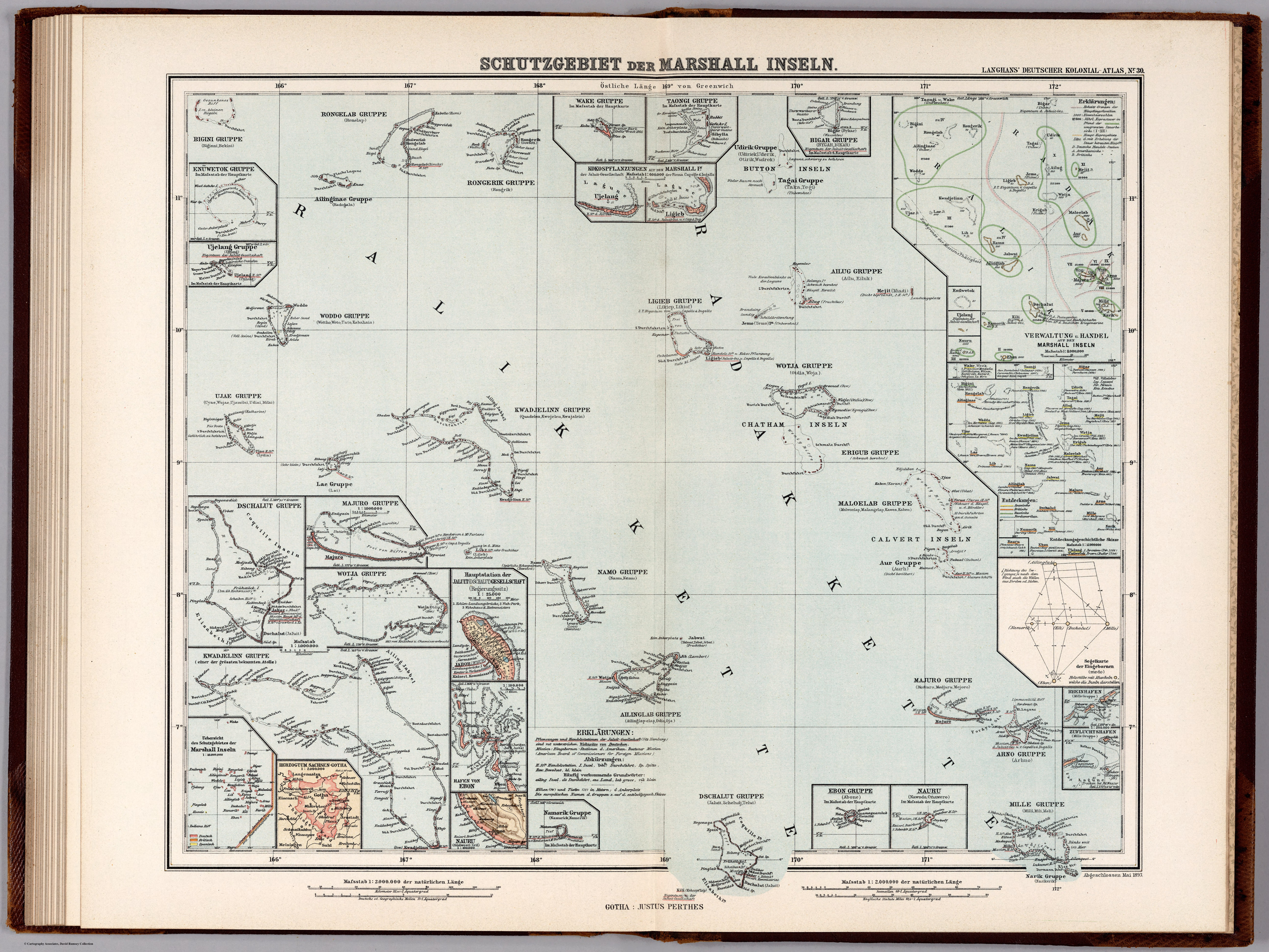
German map of the protectorate (Schutzgebiet) of the Marshall Islands, 1897.

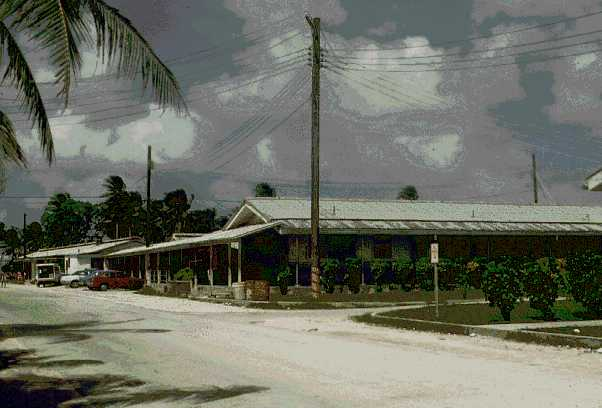
Marshall Islands District Administration (Distad) Office, 1978.

This article lists the colonial governors of the Marshall Islands, from the establishment of the German colonial presence during the 1885 Carolines Question (as part of German New Guinea), through the American capture of the islands during World War II, until the official establishment of the autonomous Government of the Marshall Islands in 1979 (within the American-administered TTPI).

== List ==
(Dates in italics indicate de facto continuation of office)

Tenure	Portrait	Incumbent	Notes
Kommissar (1885–1886)
1885 to 1886		Gustav von Oertzen	
Kaiserlicher Kommissare (Imperial commissioners, 1886–1894)
1886 to 5 October 1887		Wilhelm Knappe	
5 October 1887 to 29 March 1889		Franz Leopold Sonnenschein	Acting to 14 April 1888
29 March 1889 to 14 April 1890		Eugen Brandeis	First time, acting
14 April 1890 to February 1892		Max Biermann	
February 1892 to 1893		Eugen Brandeis	Second time, acting
1893 to 1894		Ernst Schmidt-Dargitz	
Landeshauptleute (State captains, 1894–1914)
11 May 1894 to March 1898		Georg Irmer	
24 March 1898 to 18 January 1906		Eugen Brandeis	Acting to 22 February 1900
18 March 1902 to 1903		Waldemar von Bunsen	Acting for Brandeis
1903		Konrad Geppert	Acting for Brandeis
18 January 1906 to May 1906		Ludwig Kaiser	Acting
1 April 1906 to 3 October 1914		the Governors of German New Guinea	
Bezirksamtleute (District magistrates, 1906–1911)
1906 to 30 April 1907		Victor Berg	
1907		Joseph Siegwanz	Acting
1908 to November 1909		Wilhelm Stuckhardt	
November 1909 to 1910		Erich Berghausen	Interim
1910 to 1911		Georg Merz	
Stationsleiter (Station chief, 1911–1914)
1911 to 3 October 1914		Georg Merz	Deported by the Japanese on 31 May 1915
Commanders of IJN South Seas Squadrons (1914)
3 October 1914 to 28 December 1914		Yamaya Tanin	In occupation of central and eastern Caroline Islands (from 3 October 1914) and Marshall Islands
7 October 1914 to 28 December 1914		Matsumura Tatsuo	In occupation of Palau island (from 8 October 1914), western Caroline Islands and northern Mariana Islands (from 14 October 1914)
Governors (1914–1944)
28 December 1914 to 2 February 1944		the Governors of the South Seas Mandate	
Commanders of the IJN 6th Fleet Forces Service (1941–1944) (on Kwajalein Atoll)
15 January 1941 to 1 February 1942		Sukeyoshi Yatsushirō	
5 February 1942 to 29 November 1943		Kōsō Abe	
29 November 1943 to 25 January 1944		Monzo Akiyama	Killed in the Battle of Kwajalein
USN Military Governors (1944–1947)
February 1944 to 18 July 1947		the Commanders Naval Forces Marianas	
Marshall Islands District Administrators (Distad, 1947–1979)
September 1947 to September 1948		Chester E. Herrick	
December 1948 to December 1949		Edward F. Ferguson	
March 1950 to September 1950		Roland W. Kenney	
December 1950 to June 1951		Frank W. Avila	
1951 to 1954		Donald W. Gilfillan	
1954 to 1960		Maynard Neas	
1960 to 1961		William E. Finale	
27 May 1961 to 1965		Peter Tali Coleman	
15 October 1965 to 1969		Dwight Heine	The first Micronesian to hold the office
1969 to 1970		Robert D. Law	
1970 to 1979		Oscar DeBrum	

On 1 May 1979, Marshall Islands achieved autonomy within the Trust Territory of the Pacific Islands (TTPI). For a list of heads of state after autonomy, see List of presidents of the Marshall Islands.

== See also ==
- History of the Marshall Islands
- Politics of the Marshall Islands
- Marshall Islands–United States relations
- Compact of Free Association
