= Samoan crisis =

1887–89 US-UK-German military standoff

Coordinates: 13.8333°S 171.8333°W

- Part of Samoan Civil War
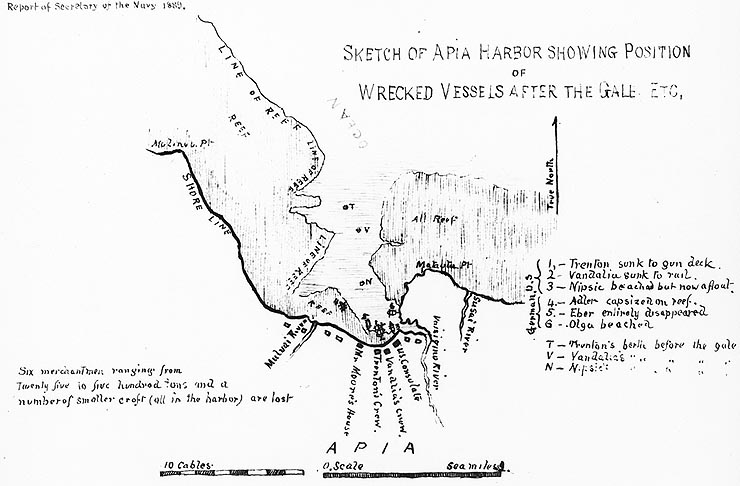
- The sketch features the locations of the wrecked German and American ships.
Date	1887–1889
Location	Apia Harbour, Samoa, Pacific Ocean
Result	Both squadrons wrecked

Belligerents
United States	German Empire

Commanders and leaders
Lewis Kimberly	(German Empire) Ernst Fritze

Strength
1 sloop-of-war 1 steamer 1 gunboat 200 marines	3 gunboats 150 marines

Casualties and losses
62 killed 1 sloop-of-war sunk 1 steamer sunk 1 gunboat grounded	~73 killed 1 gunboat sunk 2 gunboats grounded
- The British in the cruiser HMS Calliope participated as mediators, and the ship sustained fair damage.; Several merchant ships were also wrecked during the cyclone.

The Samoan crisis was a standoff between the United States, the German Empire, and the British Empire from 1887 to 1889 over control of the Samoan Islands during the First Samoan Civil War.

== Background ==
In 1878, the United States acquired a fuelling station at the harbor at Pago Pago, on the island of Tutuila, in exchange for providing guarantees of protection to Samoa. The German Empire on the other hand desired concessions at the harbor at Apia, on the island of Upolu.

== Incident ==
The incident involved three U.S. Navy warships (the sloop-of-war USS Vandalia, the screw steamer USS Trenton, and the gunboat USS Nipsic) and three German warships (the gunboats SMS Adler and SMS Eber and the corvette SMS Olga), which kept each other at bay over several months in Apia Harbour, which was monitored by the British corvette HMS Calliope.

The standoff ended when the 1889 Apia cyclone, on 15 and 16 March, wrecked all six warships in the harbour. Calliope escaped the harbour and thus survived the storm. Robert Louis Stevenson did not witness the storm and its aftermath at Apia but after his December 1889 arrival to Samoa, he wrote about the event. The Second Samoan Civil War, involving Germany, the United States, and Britain, eventually resulted in the Tripartite Convention of 1899, which partitioned the Samoan Islands into American Samoa and German Samoa.

== Legacy ==
Walter LaFeber said that the incident made some 'reticent Americans' realise the power implications of expansion in the South Pacific.

== Gallery ==
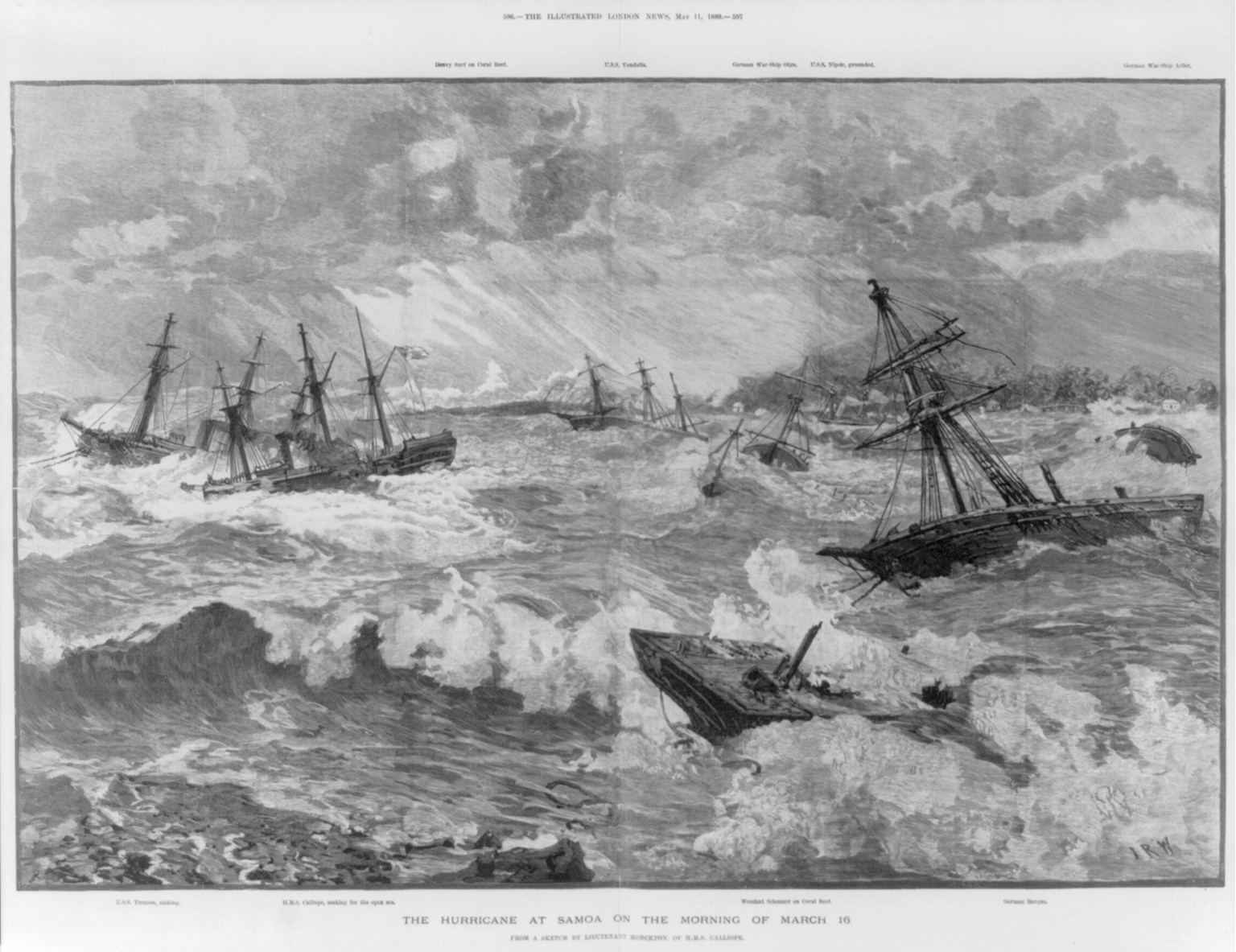
An eyewitness drawing taken from a sketch by an officer on the Calliope.

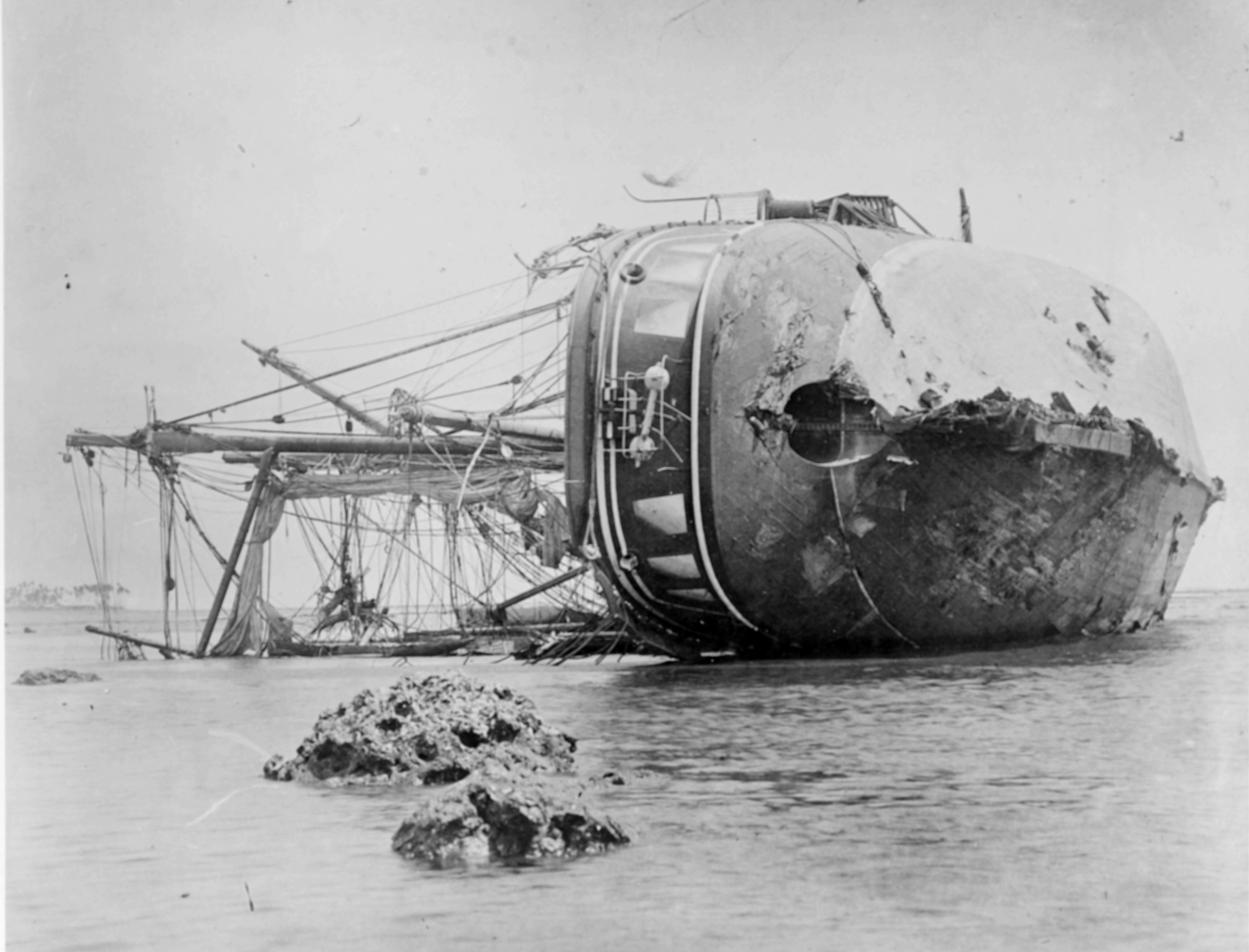
SMS Adler, knocked over on the beach, 1889.

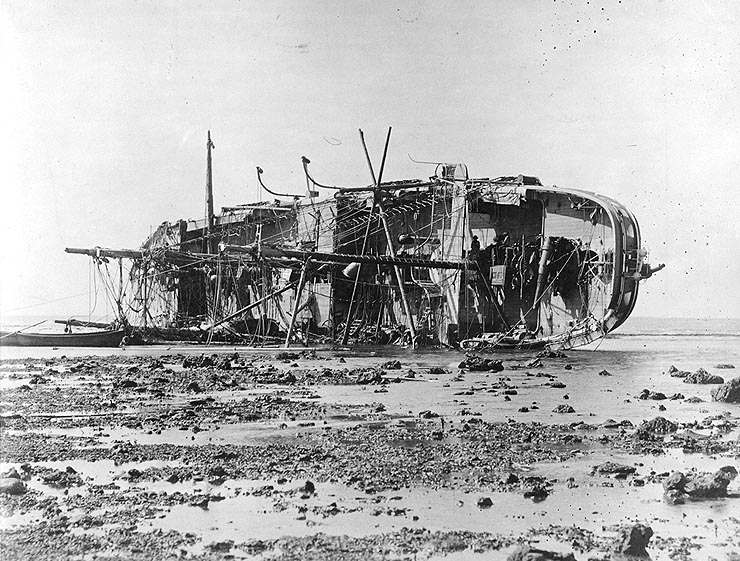
SMS Adler, view of her deck, 1889.

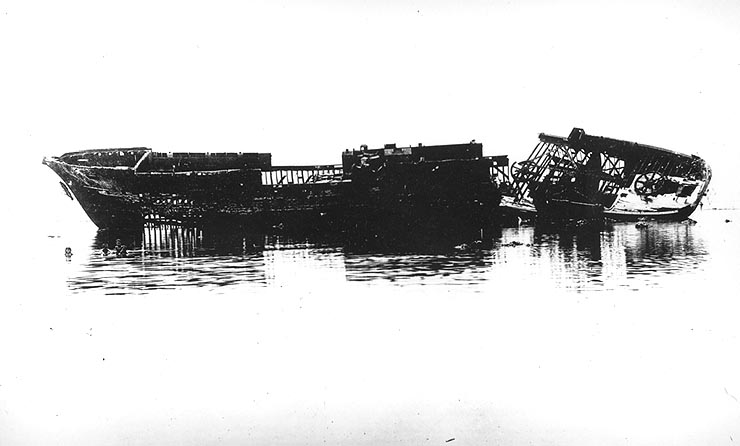
The wreck of SMS Adler, circa 1938

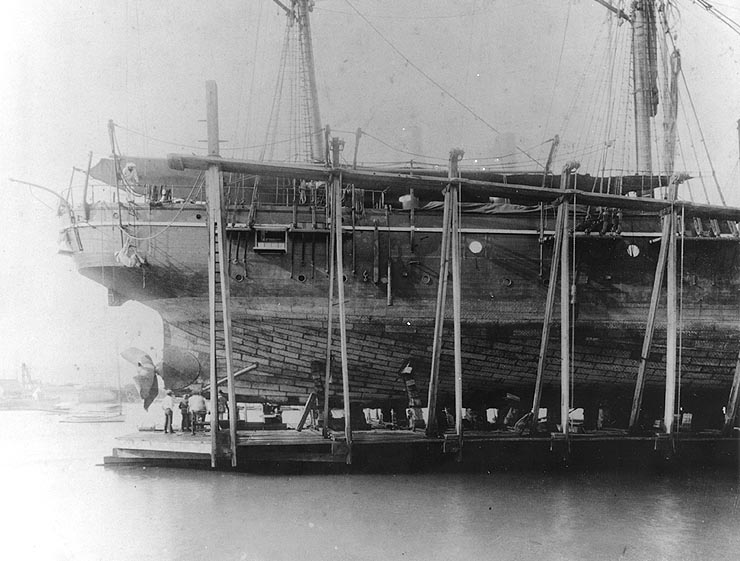
The wreck of USS Nipsic′

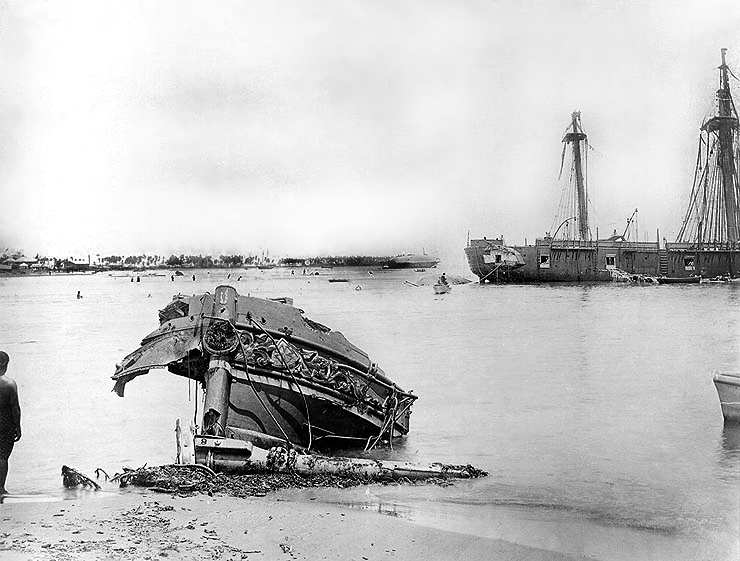
Wrecked ships in Apia Harbour. German gunboat SMS Eber is on the beach, the stern of USS Trenton is at the right, and the sunken USS Vandalia is alongside. SMS Adler is on her side in the center distance.

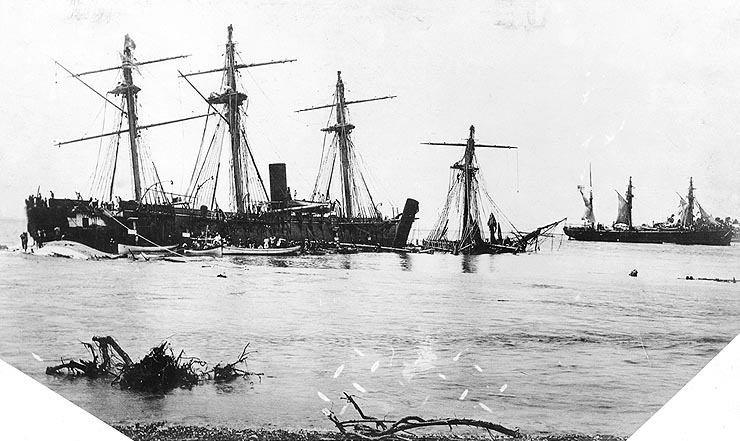
Wrecked vessels at Apia Harbour, Upolu, Samoa, during salvage efforts soon after the storm. The view looks about northward, with USS Trenton and the sunken USS Vandalia to the left and the beached German corvette Olga at right. The wreckage just off Trenton's stern may be from the German gunboat Eber, which was destroyed when she struck the harbor reef during the hurricane.

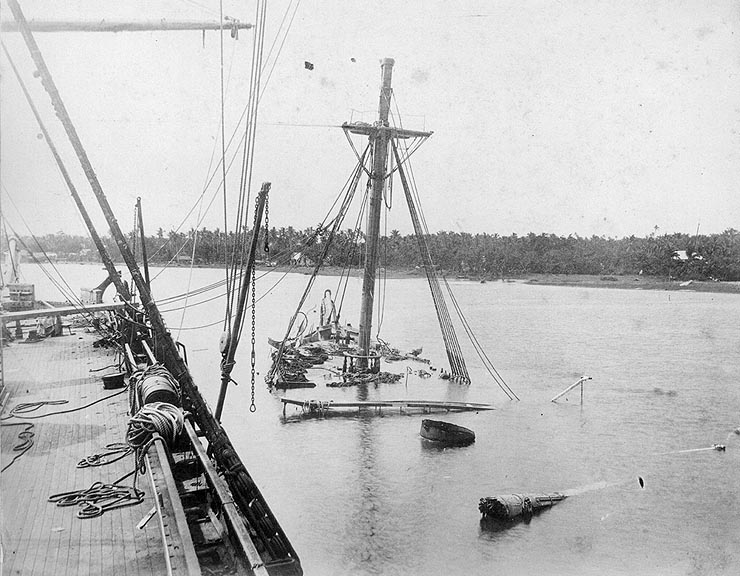
A view of the sunken USS Vandalia from the deck of USS Trenton.

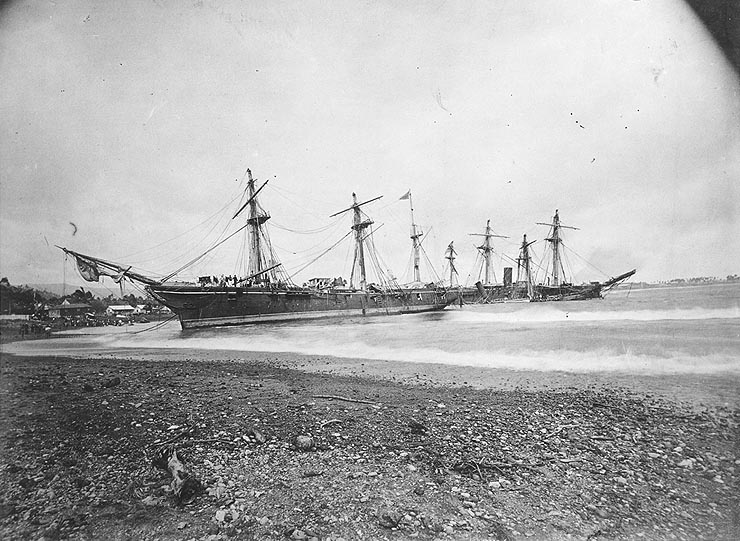
Another angle of the wrecked warships.

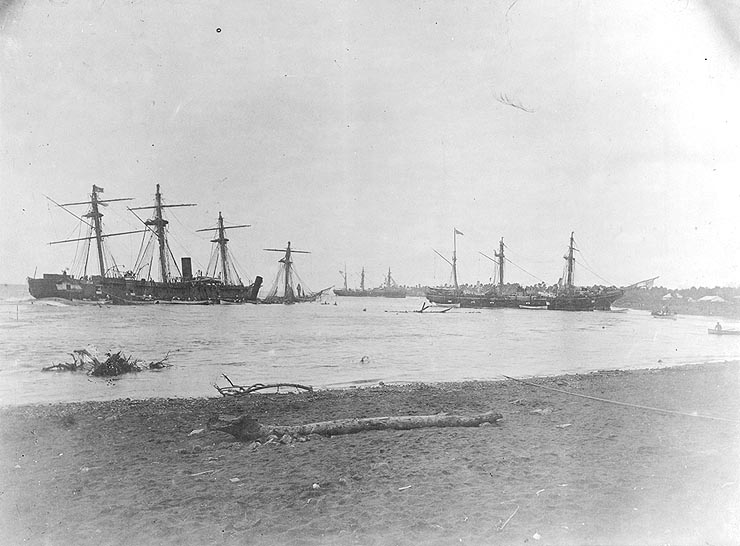
Wrecked warships off Apia

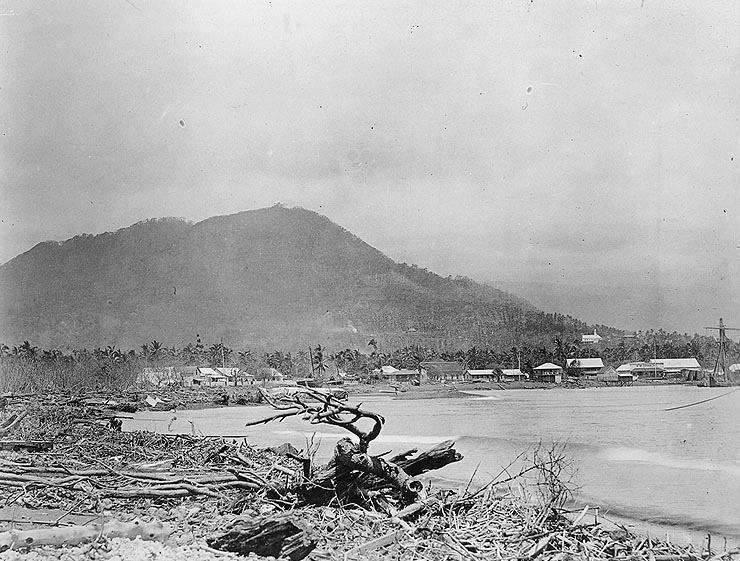
Apia and the beach covered in driftwood and debris from the wrecked warships.

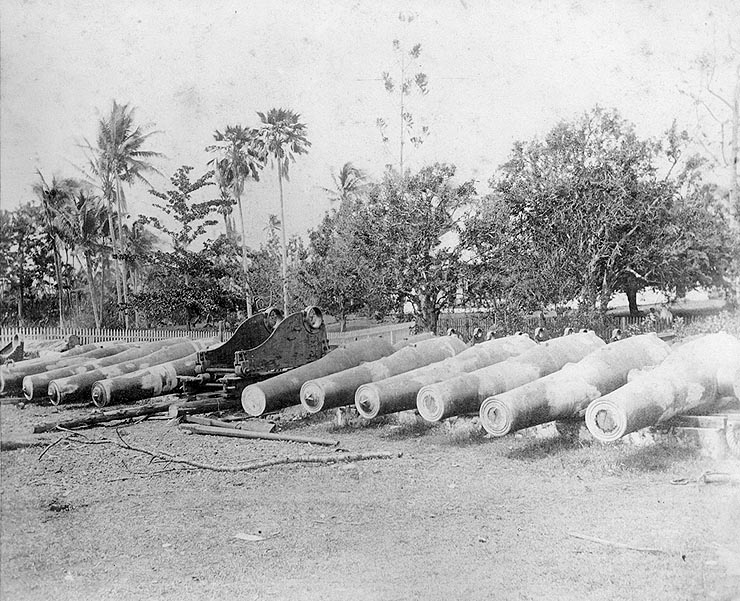
Salvaged guns from the wrecked American ships at Apia

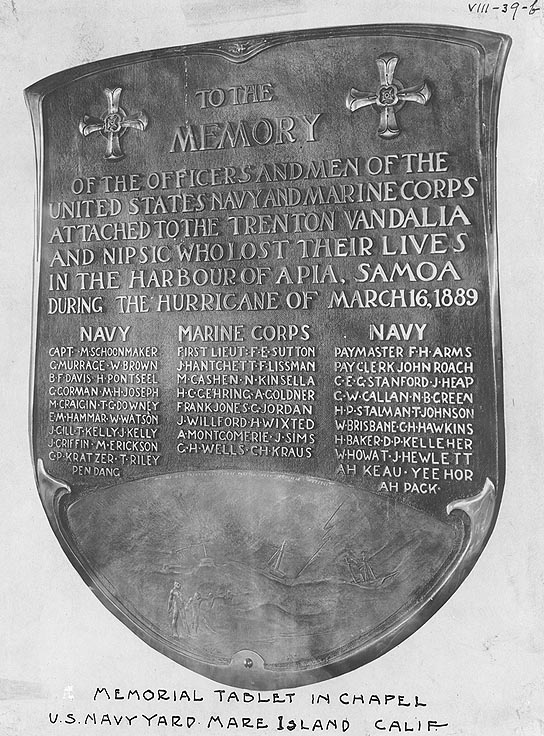
A memorial at Mare Island Naval Yard for the Americans who were killed in the cyclone.

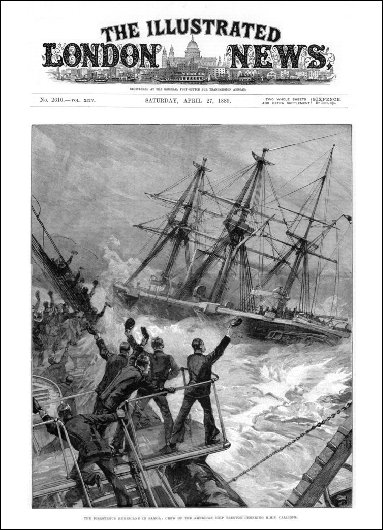
Illustrated London News for 27 April 1889; artist's conception of HMS Calliope being cheered on by the crew of USS Trenton as Calliope escapes from Apia Harbour. Calliope actually passed to the port of Trenton.

== See also ==
- Samoan Civil War
- Second Samoan Civil War
- Siege of Apia
- German Samoa
