= Second Battle of Apia =

Final battle of the Samoan Civil War

2nd Battle of Apia
- Part of the Second Samoan Civil War
Date	25 April 1899
Location	Near Apia, Upolu, Samoa
Result	American victory

Belligerents
United States	Mataafans

The Second Battle of Apia was the final engagement of the Second Samoan Civil War, and possibly fought as an attempted act of defiance by the Samoan rebels after being given an ultimatum that would have denied them access to Apia.

== Battle ==
After the third battle of Vailele, the Allies declared that so long as the Mataafans stay out of Apia, they would not take action against them. The following month, on 25 April, the Mataafans attacked American troops on patrol outside of Apia, but the rebels were driven off.
