= John J. Almy =

John Jay Almy
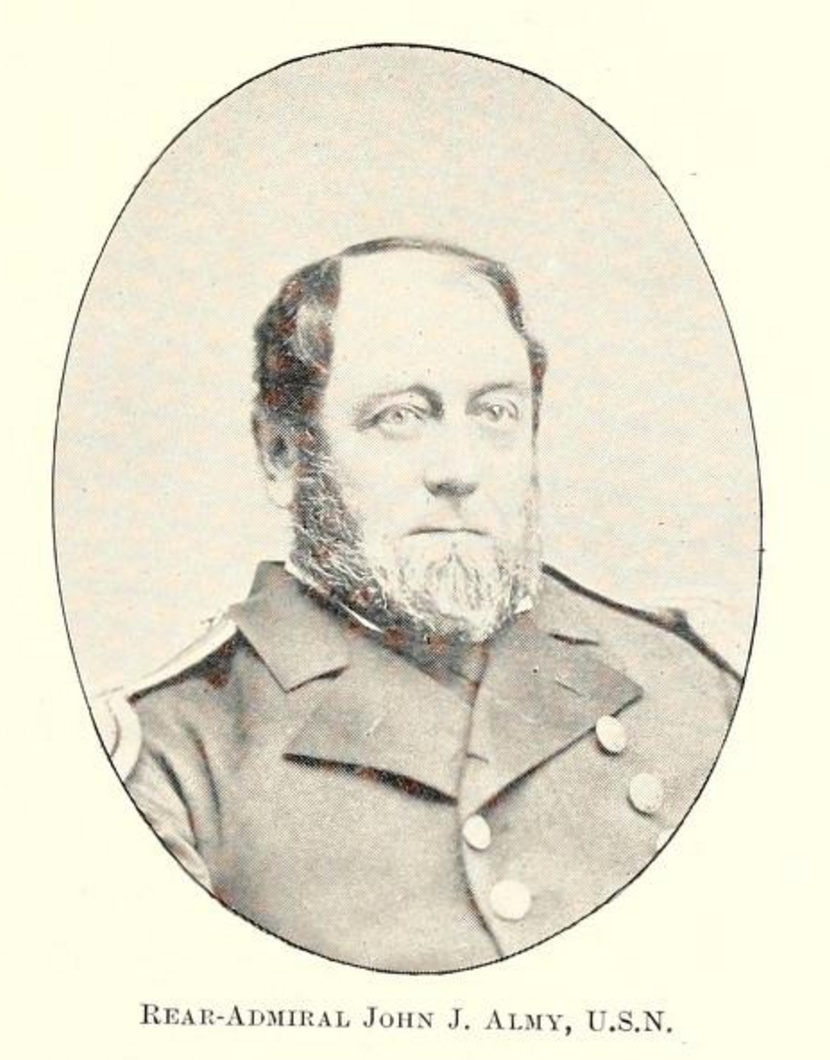
- Born: April 21, 1815; Newport, Rhode Island, U.S.
- Died: May 16, 1895 (aged 80); Washington, D.C., U.S.
- Burial place: Congressional Cemetery
- Military career
- Allegiance: United States of America
- Branch: United States Navy
- Service years: 1829–1877
- Rank: Rear admiral
- Commands: USS Fulton; USS South Carolina; USS Connecticut; USS Juniata; Pacific Squadron
- Conflicts: Mexican–American War; Paraguay expedition; American Civil War

John Jay Almy (April 21, 1815 – May 16, 1895) was a U.S. Navy Rear-Admiral, who held the record for the longest period of seagoing service (27 years, 10 months).

In the Mexican War, he took part in the capture of Vera Cruz, and in the Civil War, he captured four blockade-runners and destroyed four others. As a Rear-Admiral during a violent revolt in Panama in 1873, he was able to protect American and European property, earning official thanks from many nations.

== Early life ==
Almy was born in Newport, Rhode Island the son of Samuel Almy, who had been brought up as a Quaker, but was "read out" of the Society for marrying out of the fold. Almy was named John Jay, after the first chief justice of the United States.

== Career ==
He was appointed midshipman on February 2, 1829, at the age of 13, and served aboard the Concord and the Ontario in the Mediterranean and on the coast of Brazil, before being examined and promoted to passed midshipman on July 3, 1835. After a year aboard the receiving-ship at New York, he returned to the Mediterranean aboard Cyane serving as acting-master and navigator. Almy received his commission as lieutenant on March 8, 1841. He then served aboard the brig Bainbridge in the West Indies, and on the frigate Macedonian on the coast of Africa.

In 1847, while serving on the ship Ohio in the Gulf of Mexico and on the Pacific coast during the Mexican War, he took part in the siege and capture of Vera Cruz and in the capture of Tuxpan, and in 1848, while the navy was in occupation of Mazatlán, he commanded one of the forts.

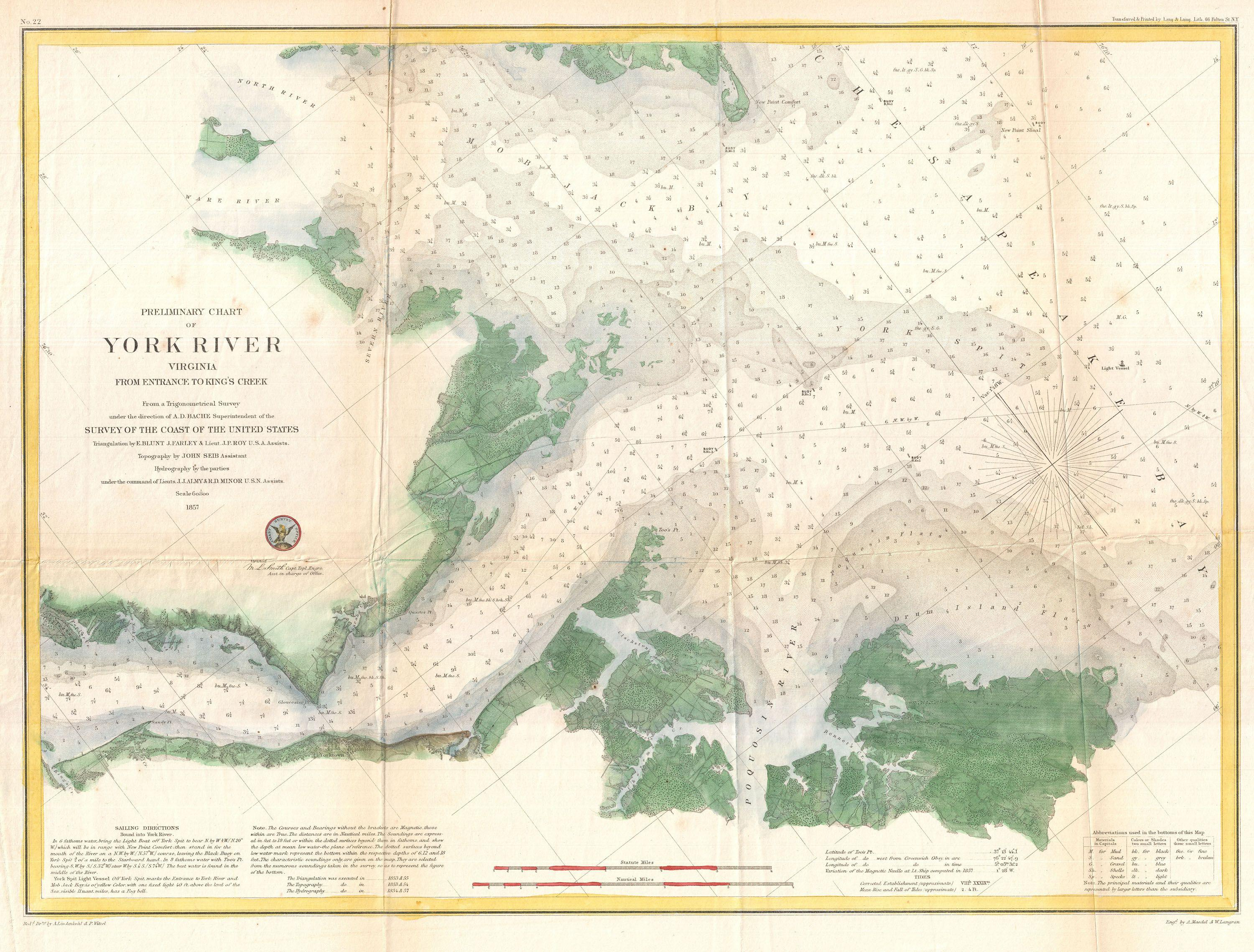
A United States Coast Survey chart of the mouth of the York River. Triangulation by E. Blunt, J. Farley and J. P. Roy. Topography by John Seib. Hydrography by a party under the command of J. J. Almy and R. D. Minor. Compiled under the direction of A. D. Bache, Superintendent.

Almy then served in the United States Coast Survey from 1851 to 1856, assisting in the making of detailed charts of Chesapeake Bay and the sea-coast of Virginia and North Carolina.

In 1857, he was given command of the Fulton on the coast of Central America, and was present at the surrender of William Walker and his filibustering party to Rear-Admiral Hiram Paulding at Nicaragua. In his reports to the Navy Department Rear-Admiral Paulding noted that, "Lieutenant-Commander Almy performed his part of the work exceedingly well, and is an officer who can be relied upon at all times." Almy also commanded the Fulton in the Paraguay expedition of 1858–59.

Almy then served at the New York Navy Yard before being commissioned as commander on April 24, 1861. During the Civil War, he commanded firstly the South Carolina in the South Atlantic Blockading Squadron under Admiral Du Pont from 1862 to 1863, then the Connecticut in the North Atlantic Blockading Squadron under Admiral Lee in 1864, and finally the Juniata in the South Atlantic Blockading Squadron under Admiral Dahlgren in 1865. While in command of the Connecticut, Almy captured four noted blockade-runners with valuable cargoes, and destroyed four others.

Almy was promoted to captain on March 3, 1865, and commanded the Juniata in a cruise to the South Atlantic, operating off the coasts of Brazil and Africa in 1865–67. While on the Brazilian coast, he rescued the crew of the shipwrecked Brazilian brig Americo, receiving the thanks of the Emperor of Brazil.

After serving as an ordnance officer at the New York Navy Yard, he was commissioned as a commodore on December 30, 1869, and served as chief signal-officer of the Navy at Washington from 1870 to 1872. He was promoted to rear-admiral on August 24, 1873, and the following month took command of the Pacific Squadron. While at Panama in October 1873, a violent revolt broke out, which lasted for three weeks. Almy landed a force of 200 seamen and marines to protect American and European property and interests, and received the thanks of the Panama Railroad Company, the Pacific Mail Steamship Company, and all of the consuls and the foreign merchants at Panama in return.

In 1875, Almy was presented with the Order of King Kamehameha I by King Kalākaua of Hawaii, after organising the King's trip to the United States on U.S. Naval vessels.

In July 1876, after serving for two years and ten months in the Pacific, Almy returned to the United States, and having reached the mandatory age, was retired in April 1877, having served for a total of twenty-seven years and ten months at sea, the longest of any officer of the navy up to that time, as well as fourteen years and eight months on shore.

Almy was the first naval officer to serve as the Commander-in-Chief of the Military Order of the Loyal Legion of the United States, succeeding former President Rutherford B. Hayes upon Hayes' death on January 17, 1893, and serving until October 11th of the same year.

== Personal life ==
Almy was twice married. By his first marriage, he had five children. His second wife was the sister of his first wife, Alida Armstrong Gardner.

== Death and legacy ==
Admiral Almy died his home on Vermont Avenue in Washington, D.C. in May 1895. After a service at the Church of the Ephiphany, he was interred at the Congressional Cemetery, rather than Arlington, at his own request.
