= Second Battle of Vailele =

1899 Battle in the Second Samoan Civil War

- Part of the Second Samoan Civil War
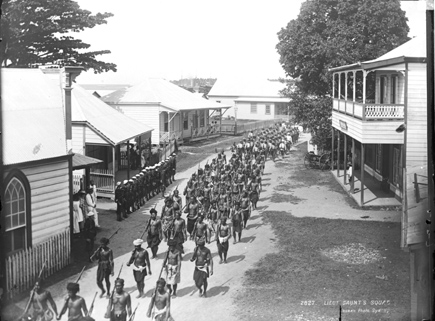
- Samoan warriors marching through Apia in March 1899, American sailors and marines are inspecting at the left.
Date	1 April 1899
Location	Vailele, Upolu, Samoa
Result	Mata'afan victory

Belligerents
Allies: Samoa; United Kingdom; United States	Mataafans; Supported by: Germany

Commanders and leaders
(United Kingdom of Great Britain and Ireland) Angel Freeman † (United States) Philip Lansdale †	Mata'afa Iosefo

Strength
Land: 136 warriors 26 marines 88 sailors Sea: 1 corvette	~800 warriors 2 forts

Casualties and losses
7–9 killed 7 wounded	~50–100 killed or wounded 2 forts damaged

The Second Battle of Vailele was fought during the Second Samoan Civil War in 1899. British, American and Samoan forces loyal to Prince Tanu were defeated by a superior force of Samoan rebels loyal to Mata'afa Iosefo. Fighting occurred at the former German plantation of Vailele, Samoa and was a major engagement in the small colonial conflict.

== Background ==
In 1899, Samoa was a warzone as it had been previously during the First Samoan Civil War. As a result of Malietoa Laupepa's death, Mata'afa Iosefo returned from exile and was elected to power by a council of Samoan chiefs. In response, the British Royal Navy and the U.S. Navy landed forces at Apia in support of Prince Tanu who was the legitimate heir to the Samoan throne which had already been taken over by the German-backed Mataafa.

The first battle of the conflict involving the British and Americans was fought at Apia, when the naval forces landed they occupied much of the city, Mataafan forces attacked, so British and American warships in Apia Harbour began bombarding enemy positions around the city. After the conflict, Mataafaite forces, as they were sometimes called, retreated to the stronghold of Vailele and thus began several American and British expeditions into the dense jungle to find the chief's men.

At the end of March, a joint expedition of British, American and Samoan forces marched along the coast from Apia towards Vailele. Skirmishes were fought and two villages destroyed as the Samoan rebels retreated. On 1 April, the expedition of 26 marines, 88 sailors and 136 Samoans left the coast for an attack on the landward side of Vailele, leaving the protection of naval gunfire support. The cruisers USS Philadelphia, HMS Tauranga, HMS Porpoise and the corvette HMS Royalist landed the sailors and marines, Royalist was sent ahead of the expedition to bombard the two forts guarding Vailele plantation.

== Battle ==
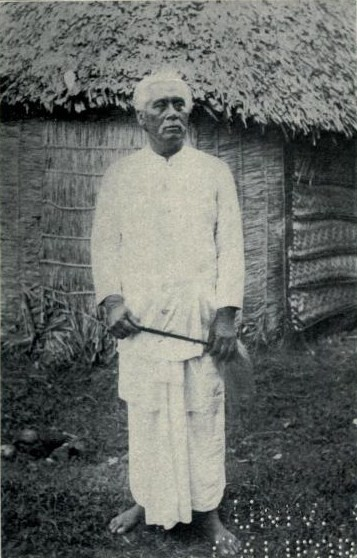
Mata'afa Iosefo in 1911.

When the landing party approached the plantation, HMS Royalist ceased her bombardment, and just then the land force, under the command of Royal Navy Lieutenant Angel Hope Freeman and American Lieutenant Philip Lansdale, was ambushed by over 800 riflemen hidden all around in the foliage of the jungle. The expedition quickly began returning volleys and the Americans set up a Colt machine gun. Mataafan forces first attacked the allied column from the rear and from the left flank. Lieutenant Freeman was killed and beheaded just after fighting began, he was hit by snipers hiding among palm and banana trees. The rebels then charged and Lieutenant Landsdale took command. Close quarters combat and skirmishing continued for a while, the rebel Samoans repeatedly attacked the expedition's front line and several of them were killed or wounded. The machine gun jammed after firing only a few shots and as Lieutenant Landsdale attempted to fix the problem, a shot hit him in the thigh and he fell to the ground with his bone shattered. A retreat was sounded, and Landsdale ordered his men to save themselves so the expedition began to fall back which left the lieutenant alone under heavy fire. Refusing to leave his commander, Ensign John R. Monaghan, picked up a rifle and with three others, went after Landsdale and when they were carrying him out of action, Seaman Norman Edsall was shot and killed.

Once again, Landsdale ordered his rescuers to flee but they held their ground waiting for reinforcements and were killed by fast approaching Samoan rebels. After the battle, Landsdale and Monaghan were found dead side by side and the expedition retreated to the coast having suffered many casualties which were accounted for the following morning. During the withdrawal, HMS Royalist resumed fire and bombarded the bush from which the Mataafans were attacking. Samoan rebel forces lost 100 killed or wounded while the expedition's casualties were much lighter in comparison. Of the 56 American sailors and marines at the battle, four were killed and another five were wounded. The British lost three men killed, out of sixty-two men engaged, two others were wounded. Federal Samoan casualties were light if any. They were under American command and most deserted at the sound of the first volley, the remaining were used to reinforce the front line. Later patrols reported finding large pools of blood behind the banana trees, evidence of rebel casualties. Two marine privates, Henry L. Hulbert and Michael Joseph McNally, received the Medal of Honor for their actions during the fighting.

== Aftermath ==
The battle was a defeat for the expeditionary forces. They retreated to Apia and reported their casualties to their commanders who decided to plan for future operations in the area. On 13 April, the British frontline was extended just south of Vailele and that day the Matafaans attacked but were repulsed. Another expedition later fought again within Vailele, this time the rebels won again when they withstood a British led attack on the two forts. The engagements occurred near the battlefield where Samoan rebels defeated German troops in 1889 during the first civil war on the island. A statue of Ensign Monaghan was erected in Spokane, Washington to commemorate the young officer's bravery. The official report of Monaghan's death reads;

"The men were not in sufficient numbers to hold out any longer, and they were forced along by a fire which it was impossible to withstand. Ensign Monaghan did stand. He stood steadfast by his wounded superior and friend - one rifle against many, one brave man against a score .... He knew he was doomed. He could not yield. He died in heroic performance of duty."
