= Second Samoan Civil War =

1898–1899 conflict in Samoa

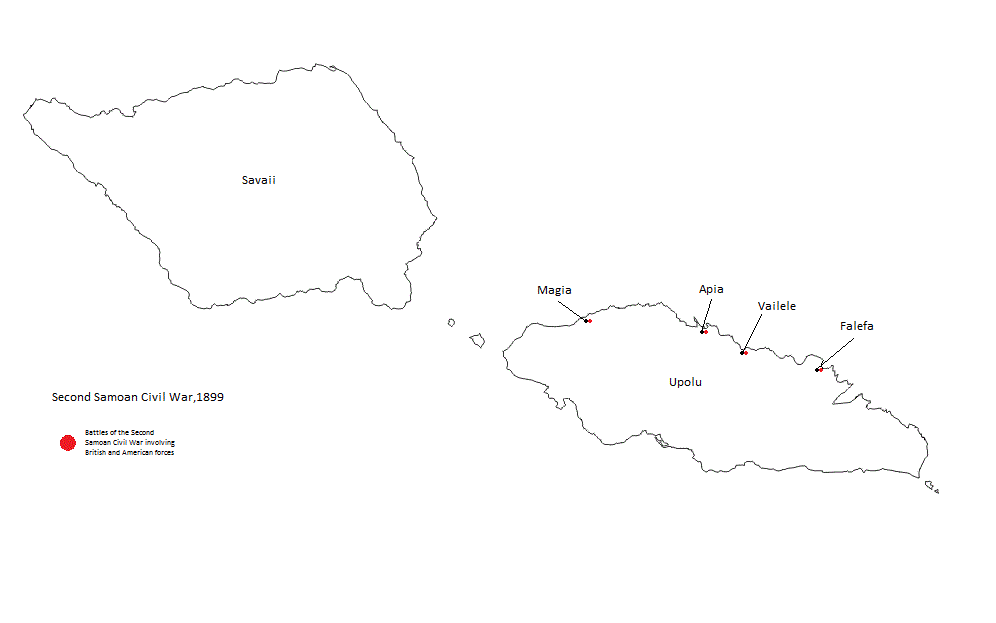
- Map featuring the locations of battles in which British and U.S. forces fought.
Date	1898–1899
Location	Apia, Upolu, Samoa, Pacific Ocean
Result	Compromise; Tripartite Convention; Partitioning of the Samoan archipelago; United States acquires American Samoa; Germany acquires German Samoa; Britain withdraws claim in exchange for concessions in the Solomon Islands; Mata'afa Iosefo becomes paramount chief of Samoa

Belligerents
Allies: Samoa United States; United Kingdom	Mataafans; Supported by: Germany

Commanders and leaders
Tanumafili I; (United States) Albert Kautz; (United Kingdom of Great Britain and Ireland) Leslie Stuart	Mata'afa Iosefo

Casualties and losses
24 killed or wounded	127 killed or wounded 2 forts damaged

The Second Samoan Civil War was a conflict that reached a head in 1898 when Germany, the United Kingdom, and the United States were locked in dispute over who should have control over the Samoan island chain, located in the South Pacific Ocean.

At the war's conclusion in 1899, the United States were granted the eastern section of the islands, the Germans were granted the western section of the islands, and the British were given the northern Solomon Islands of Choiseul, Isabel and the Shortland Islands that had formerly belonged to Germany. The German half was occupied and annexed by New Zealand in 1914 and is now an independent nation – Samoa. The U.S. half still remains under the control of the U.S. government as the territory of American Samoa.

== Combatants ==
The allies were the Samoan followers of Malietoa Tanumafili I and supporting naval forces from the United States and the United Kingdom. These forces fought against the rebels of Mata'afa Iosefo, who were supported by Germany.

== History ==
As result of Malietoa Laupepa's death, Mata'afa Iosefo returned from exile and was elected to power by a council of Samoan chiefs. In response, the British Royal Navy and the U.S. Navy landed forces at Apia in support of Laupepa's son Malietoa Tanumafili I against the German-backed Mataafa.

The first battle of the conflict involving the British and Americans was the Siege of Apia; when the naval forces landed they occupied much of the city, Mataafan forces attacked, so British and U.S. warships in Apia Harbour began bombarding enemy positions around the city. After the conflict, Mataafaite forces retreated to the stronghold of Vailele and thus began several U.S. and British expeditions into the dense jungle to find the chief's men.

At the end of March, a joint expedition of British, U.S., and Samoan forces marched along the coast from Apia towards Vailele. Skirmishes were fought and two villages destroyed as the Samoan rebels retreated. On April 1, the expedition of 26 marines, 88 sailors and 136 Samoans left the coast for an attack on the landward side of Vailele, leaving the protection of naval gunfire support. The cruisers USS Philadelphia, HMS Tauranga, HMS Porpoise and the corvette HMS Royalist landed the sailors and marines, Royalist was sent ahead of the expedition to bombard the two forts guarding Vailele plantation.

The Second Battle of Vailele on 1 April was a defeat for the expeditionary forces. They retreated back to Apia and reported their casualties to their commanders, who decided to plan for future operations in the area. On April 13, the British frontline was extended just south of Vailele, and that day the Matafaans attacked, but were repulsed. Another expedition later fought again within Vailele. The rebels won again when they withstood a British-led attack on the two forts. The engagements occurred near the battlefield where Samoan rebels had defeated German troops in 1888 during the first civil war on the island. A statue of Ensign John R. Monaghan was erected in Spokane, Washington to commemorate the young officer's bravery. A second battle in Apia took place on 25 April, when a small force of Samoans attacked a patrol of U.S. Marines, but were driven off without inflicting any casualties.

The war eventually resulted, via the Tripartite Convention of 1899, in the partition of the Samoan Islands into American Samoa and German Samoa.

== See also ==
- First Samoan Civil War
- Samoan crisis
- Mata'afa Iosefo
- Malietoa Tanumafili I
- German Samoa
- Siege of Apia
- Battle of Vailele
- Second Battle of Apia

== Gallery ==
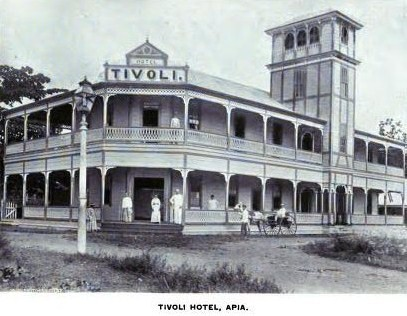
Tivoli Hotel in 1896, used as the command post for American force during the battle at Apia.

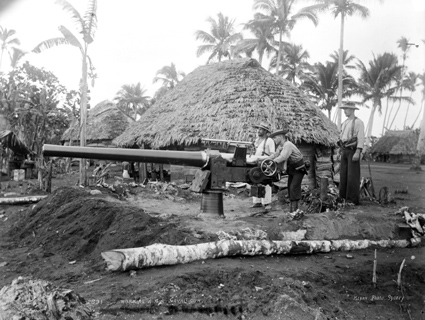
United States Marines and a naval gun in Upolu, 1899.

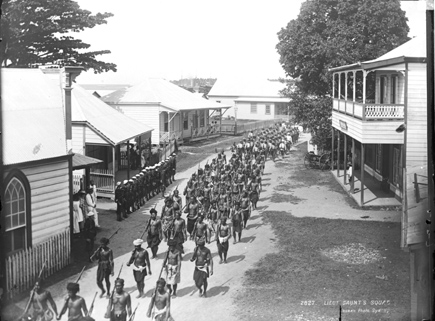
Samoan warriors and American servicemen during the Siege of Apia in March 1899.

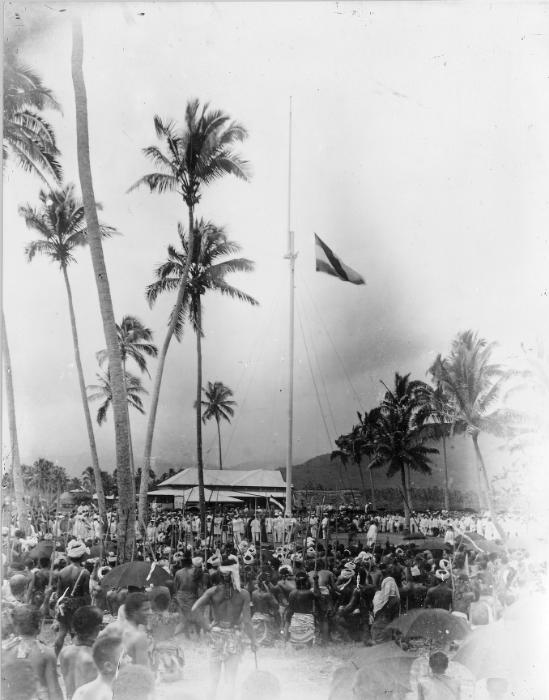
German flag raising ceremony commemorating the creation of German Samoa in 1900.

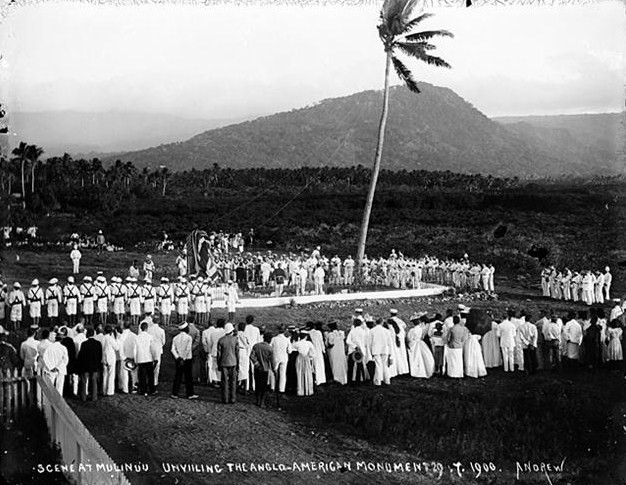
Samoans, Americans and Britons holding a ceremony while erecting a monument on Mulinuu Peninsula, 1902.

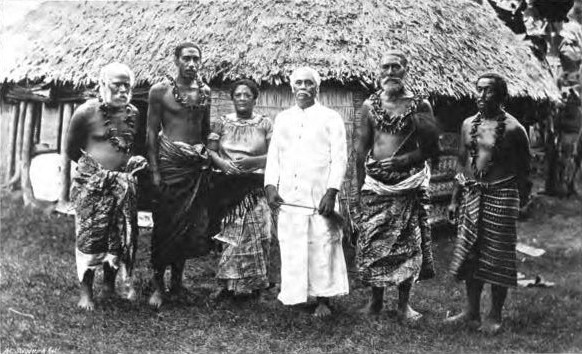
Mata'afa Iosefo and followers, 1902.
