= Imperial commissioner =

Imperial commissioner is an ambivalent English language term, used to render foreign language titles of various – mostly gubernatorial – officers whose 'commission' was in the gift of an Emperor, including China, the Russian Empire and the Holy Roman Empire.

- The German title, in both the German Empire (1871–1918) and Nazi Germany (1933–45), was usually Reichskommissar.
- However, Imperial Commissioner can also be used to render Kaiserlicher Kommissar, which in German etymology refers to the Emperor, not to the Empire. This was notably the case for a gubernatorial style in the colonial possession of Jaluit (in the South sea, presently in the Marshall Islands), which were administered, after a single Kommissar ('Commissioner'; 1885–1886, Gustav von Oertzen, b. 18.. – d. 1911), by the following Kaiserliche Kommissare:
  - 1886 – 5 October 1887 Wilhelm Knappe (b. 1855 – d. 1910)
  - 5 October 1887 – 29 March 1889 Franz Leopold Sonnenschein (acting to 14 April 1888) (b. 1857 – d. 1897)
  - 29 March 1889 – 14 April 1890 Eugen Brandeis (acting) (b. 1846 – d. 1919) (1st time)
  - 14 April 1890 – February 1892 Friedrich Louis Max Biermann (b. 1856 – d. 1929)
  - February 1892 – 1893 Eugen Brandeis (acting) (2nd time)
  - 1893–1894 Ernst Schmidt-Dargitz (b. 1859 – d. 1924); thereafter by Landeshauptleute

== See also ==
- Imperial Commissioner (China)
- Commissioner

== Sources and references ==
- WorldStatesmen- Marshall islands
