= Eugen Brandeis =

German merchant, engineer and colonial official (1846–1930)

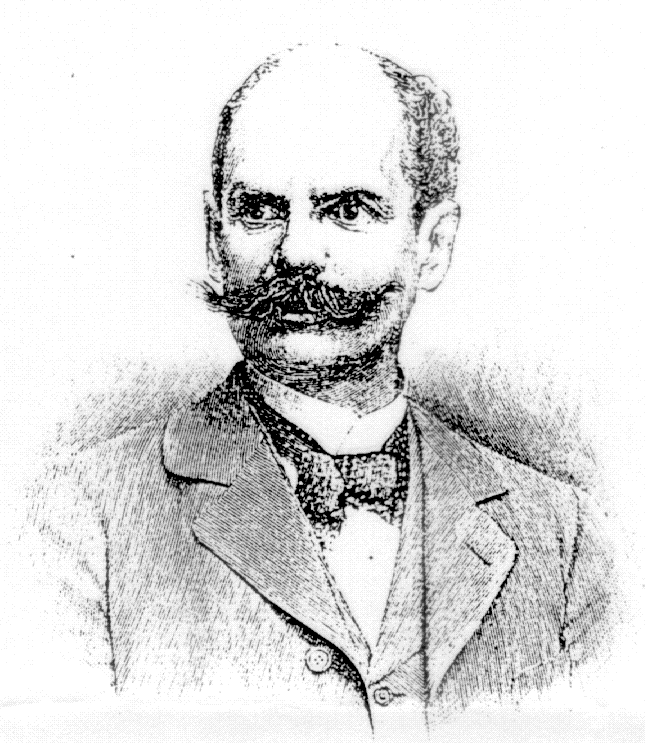
- Eugen Brandeis in 1905

Personal details
- Born: 23 September 1846 Geisingen, Grand Duchy of Baden, German Confederation
- Died: 9 December 1930 (aged 84) Bad Säckingen, Republic of Baden, Weimar Republic
- Spouse: Antonie Brandeis
- Children: Marie Margarethe; Julia Johanna
- Occupation: Merchant and engineer

Eugen Brandeis (Geisingen, 23 September 1846 – Bad Säckingen, 9 December 1930) was a German merchant and engineer in Central America and an administrative official in the German colonies in the Pacific Ocean.

== Biography ==
Brandeis, a son of the Russian court councillor Hermann Brandeis, attended high school in Baden-Baden from 1854 to 1861, then high school in Freiburg, where he graduated in 1863. Until 1866 he studied mathematics, first at the Karlsruhe University of Technology, then at the Albert Ludwig University of Freiburg. During his studies in Karlsruhe he became a member of the Corps Saxonia in 1864.

In 1866 he joined the 5th Baden Infantry Regiment as an advantageur. From 1868 he served as a lieutenant in the Grand Duchy of Baden field artillery regiment, with which he also took part in the Franco-Prussian War. From 1873 he served in the Silesian foot artillery. In 1875 he was promoted to first lieutenant. In 1876 he became an officer in the reserves and voluntarily retired from the Baden Army the following year.

From 1877 to 1881, Brandeis worked as a merchant for a Hamburg trading house in Gonaïves, Haiti. From 1879 to 1882 he administered the German consulate in Haiti. At the same time, in 1880 he worked on railway construction in Cuba. In 1884, Brandeis was employed as an engineer during the construction of the Panama Canal. Due to illness, he was seconded to the German consulate in Sydney in 1886.

Between 1886 and 1888, during the Samoan Civil War, Brandeis advised the Samoan King Tupua Tamasese Titimaea, who had come to power with German support. He trained a local police force loyal to the king and provided the king's supporters with weapons to protect the colonists from their opponents, and to crush protests against the newly imposed poll tax on the locals. He left Apia in February 1889. At the same time he was a member of the Secret Chancellery of the Foreign Office. From 1 December 1889 to 15 April 1891, Brandeis was secretary at the Imperial Commissariat on Jaluit in the Marshall Islands, then deputy commissioner. Brandeis was also a member of the German Trade and Plantation Society (DHPG).

On 5 February 1892 Brandeis was appointed Chief Judge for the Eastern District of Bismarck Archipelago and the Solomon Islands of the Colony of German New Guinea. In July 1893 there were riots due to the illegal expansion of the German New Guinea Company plantations. Brandeis responded to the local uprising with a punitive expedition.

From 17 December 1892 to 14 December 1894 (acting until 5 February 1893) he was a judge in Herbertshöhe (today Kokopo) on the island of Neupommern (today New Britain) for the colony of the German New Guinea Company. During the dispute between the colonist Georg Schmiele and Paul Kolbe, husband of "Queen Emma" in June 1894, Brandeis pointed out to the former his "duty" as an officer, namely to challenge Kolbe to a pistol duel at 15 m. In the same year he undertook another punitive expedition against the native population as a captain with other colonists.

From 1895 to 1898 he worked in Berlin in the Imperial Colonial Office of the Foreign Office.

Since 24 March 1898, he was Imperial commissioner for the Marshall Islands, where he arrived on 28 August, only four months after his appointment. His title changed to Landeshauptmann on 22 February 1900. He retired on 18 January 1906. His removal was due to excessive punishment and brutality towards the locals. During this stage he took part voluntarily in World War I.

=== Family ===
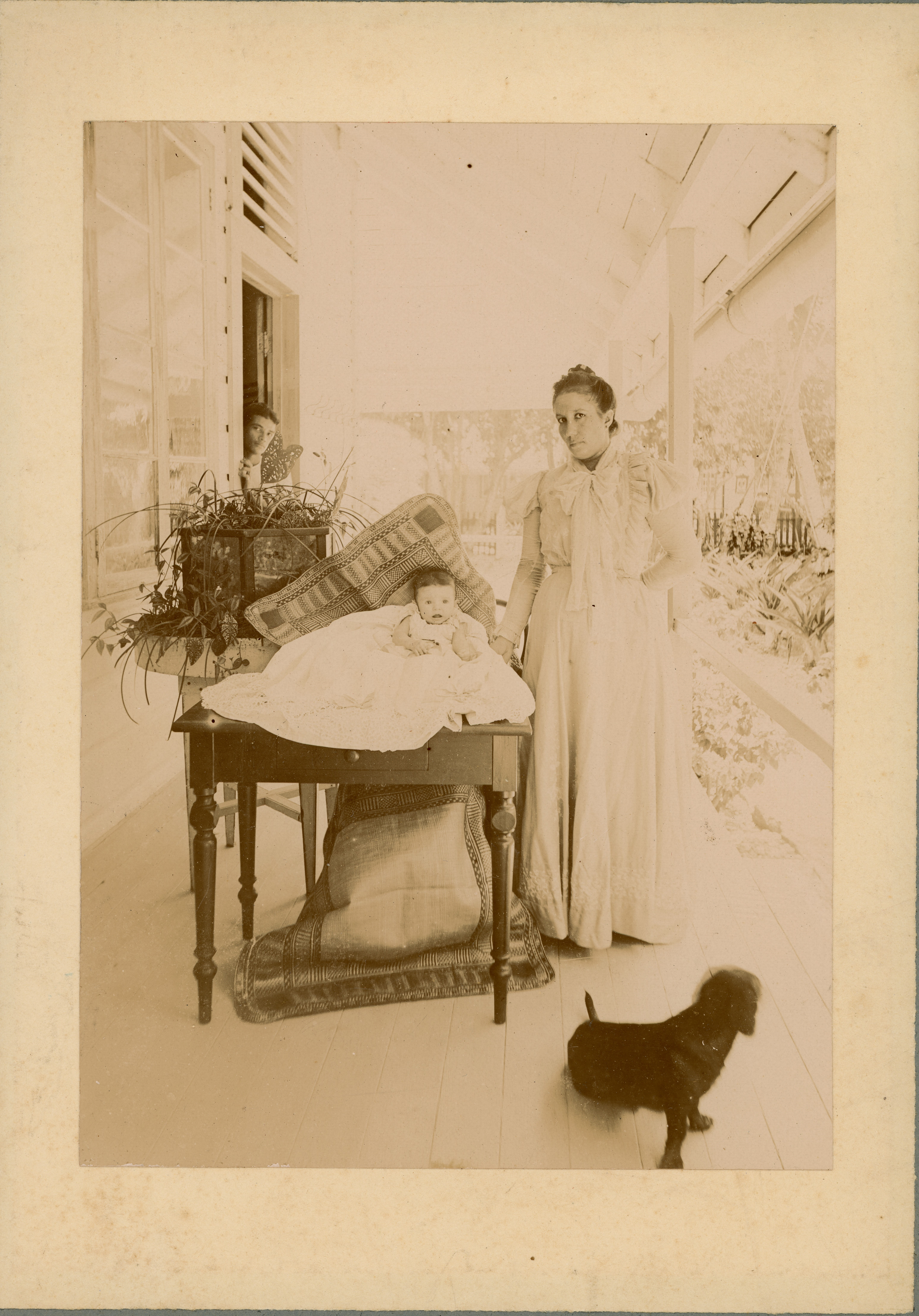
Antonie Brandeis with Marie Margarethe in Jaluit, c. 1900

On 30 April 1898, Brandeis married his second wife in Beirut. His wife Antonie Brandeis (25 March 1868 – 1945) was a daughter of merchant Rudolph Heinrich Ruete and Emily Ruete (born as Sayyida Salme, a princess of Oman and Zanzibar). The daughters Marie Margarethe (born September 6, 1900, in Jaluit) and Julia Johanna (born August 10, 1904, in Jaluit) came from the marriage.

Antonie Brandeis worked in nursing in Jaluit and collected ethnographical items. Since 1908 she was actively involved in the Women's Association of the German Colonial Society. In 1911 she took part in the International Hygiene Exhibition in Dresden, organized by Friedrich Fülleborn. After her separation from Brandeis, Antonie lived in Hamburg and was instrumental in founding the Colonial Women's School in Rendsburg. In 1907 she wrote the Cookbook for the Tropics (Kochbuch für die Tropen).

=== Awards ===
- Iron Cross (1870) 2nd Class in 1871
- Order of the Zähringer Lion:
  - Cross of Merit in 1870?
  - Knight's Cross 2nd Class in 1871
  - Knight's Cross 1st Class with Oak Leaves in 1908

== Bibliography and sources ==
- Dirk H. R. Spennemann: An Officer, Yes But a Gentleman...? Eugen Brandeis, Military Adviser, Imperial Judge and Administrator in the German Colonial Service in the South Pacific. Centre for South Pacific Studies, University of New South Wales, Sydney 1998, ISBN 0-7334-0454-5.
- (in German) Dirk H. R. Spennemann: Eugen Brandeis. In: Fred Ludwig Sepaintner (Hrsg.): Badische Biographien, Neue Folge 5, S. 29–31.
- (in German) Karl Baumann, Dieter Klein, Wolfgang Apitzsch: Biographisches Handbuch Deutsch-Neuguinea. Kurzlebensläufe ehemaliger Kolonisten, Forscher, Missionare und Reisender. 2. Auflage, Fassberg, Berlin 2002. (Einträge zu Antonie und Eugen Brandeis)
