= Siege of Apia =

March 1899 battle of the Second Samoan Civil War

- Part of the Second Samoan Civil War
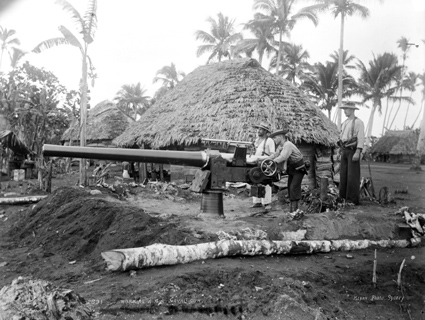
- United States Marines manning a naval gun near Apia in March of 1899
Date	14–30 March 1899
Location	Apia, Upolu, Samoa, Pacific Ocean
Result	Allied victory

Belligerents
Allies: Samoa; United Kingdom; United States	Mataafans; Supported by: Germany

Commanders and leaders
(United States) Albert Kautz (United Kingdom) Leslie Stuart	Mata'afa Iosefo

Strength
Land: 2,260; Sea: 3 cruisers 1 corvette	4,000

Casualties and losses
9 killed 10–15 wounded	~27 killed

The siege of Apia, or the battle of Apia, occurred during the Second Samoan Civil War in March 1899 at Apia. Samoan forces loyal to Malietoa Tanumafili I were besieged by a larger force of Samoan rebels loyal to Mata'afa Iosefo. Supporting Malietoa were landing parties from four British and American warships. Over the course of several days of fighting, the Samoan rebels were defeated.

== Background ==
Followers of Mata'afa Iosefo received support from Germany. In January 1899, Malietoa Tanumafili I was exiled by the Mataafans which provoked a response from the United States Navy and the Royal Navy. Rear Admiral Albert Kautz of the cruiser USS Philadelphia arrived first on 13 March and held a meeting with the many different officials there. When no solution was agreed upon, a shore party was landed and the Mataafa's followers were ordered to leave Apia and go back to their villages. Instead of following this command, the Mataafans removed themselves from town but only to the outskirts where they started evicting the European and American population from their homes. Refugees started fleeing to Apia where they took up houses along the coast, under the protection of naval guns. The British cruiser HMS Porpoise and corvette HMS Royalist were deployed to Apia; sailors and marines from these two vessels were also landed for the protection of the town.

== Siege ==
On 15 March Rear Admiral Kautz sent the Mataafa another message, this time he demanded that the Mataafans leave the outskirts of the town. This message was ignored and instead Mata'afa Iosefo increased the numbers of his men around Apia and attacked. The British and American commanders estimated that a total of over 4,000 rebel warriors armed with 2,500 rifles opposed them. Over the course of the siege there were about 260 British and American servicemen involved, fighting with about 2,000 friendly Samoan warriors. Apia referred to the main settlement which was surrounded by several nearby villages. The Americans held the Tivoli Hotel in Apia, which was used as their command post, sentries were also placed at the consulates which were fairly isolated according to reports and mostly surrounded by dense jungle. At 12:30 am, the Mataafans rushed the British and American consulates guarded by sailors and marines under Lieutenant Guy Reginald Archer Gaunt of HMS Porpoise and Captain M. Perkins of the United States Marines. Though the British and Americans held their fire, the Samoans retreated after realizing that Apia's garrison was on high alert and prepared for battle.

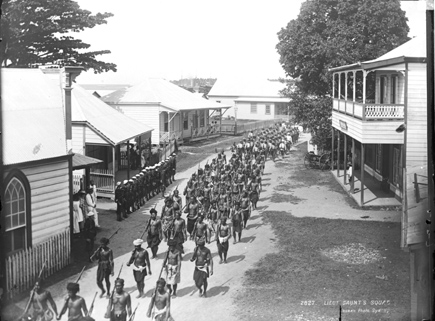
Samoan loyalists and American servicemen in Apia, March 1899

Just before 1:00 pm, rebel boats were spotted off Vaiusu and were thought to be making an attack on the Samoan refugees in the village of Mulinuu. At this time, Kautz was informed of the assault on the consulates so he gave the order to open fire on the boats and on the Mataafa's front line. All three of the British and American warships began bombarding the boats and the outskirts of Apia until 5:00 pm, when HMS Porpoise was detached alone to shell the Vaiusu and Vaimoso villages. Several boats were sunk that day and hundreds of shells expended. The Mataafans decided to attack the American held hotel the following night on 15 March. During this assault, the Samoan rebels advanced hastily and temporarily captured a 7-pounder artillery piece before being repulsed by fire from both the garrison and the warships. One American sentry was killed along with three Britons, and Samoan casualties are unknown. From then on until the end of the siege, the fighting took the form of sniping and skirmishing. Mataafa's army continued to occupy the outskirts of Apia and many of the surrounding villages. Thus the Allied force came to the conclusion that they had to combine their strength and attack the Mataafan's front line or wherever they were in large numbers. By engaging the rebels in a decisive action, they would be forced to abandon the siege.

On 24 March, the cruiser HMS Tauranga under Captain Leslie Creery Stuart arrived at Apia, Captain Stuart then took command of British naval operations in Samoa. The final engagement occurred on March 30 when the British, American and Samoan loyalists marched south to confront Mataafa. Three miles south of Apia, the Allies under the command of Lieutenant Gault attacked and routed a large rebel force. Twenty-seven Mataafans were counted dead with a loss of three more Britons, one American sailor and one Samoan warrior, and several others were wounded. After this, the rebels retreated to their main stronghold of Vailele, southeast of Apia. During the siege the German consulate was hit by shell fire and later its occupants protested the American and British use of force in Samoa.

== Aftermath ==
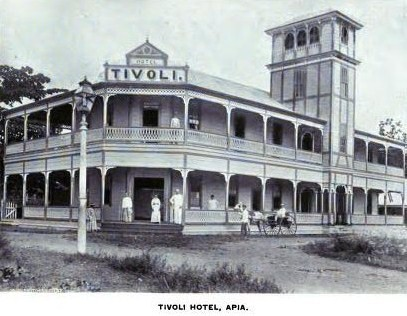
Tivoli Hotel in 1896, an American post during the siege

After the siege of Apia, the Samoan loyalists, the British and the Americans began operations against Vailele. On 1 April, an expedition of about 250 men proceeded to the settlement, supported by HMS Royalist. Two villages were burned along the way, and the Royalist bombarded Vailele's fortifications. But when the expedition approached the town, a superior force of Mataafans ambushed and defeated them. On 13 March, the rebels attacked the British and Samoan front line just outside Vailele. In this battle the Matafaans were repulsed. On 17 March, the Allies engaged at Vailele for the third and final time. British and Samoan loyalists, with aid from a small force of Americans, captured one of the two forts at Vailele, but they were forced to retreat soon after. During this action USS Philadelphia and the British warships bombarded the port. The third battle at Vailele became the last significant engagement of the war. After it, the Allies declared that so long as the Mataafans stay out of Apia, they would not take action against them. One more skirmish occurred on 25 April when the Mataafans attacked an American marine patrol outside of Apia, but the rebels were driven off.

== See also ==
- Philippine–American War
- Banana Wars
