= Albert Kautz =

US Navy admiral (1839–1907)

- Born: January 29, 1839; Georgetown, Ohio, US
- Died: February 6, 1907 (aged 68); Florence, Italy
- Burial place: Arlington National Cemetery
- Relatives: August Kautz (brother)
- Military career
- Allegiance: United States of America
- Branch: United States Navy
- Service years: 1854–1901
- Rank: Rear admiral
- Commands: Pacific Squadron
- Conflicts: American Civil War; First Samoan Civil War; Second Samoan Civil War

Rear Admiral Albert Kautz (January 29, 1839 – February 6, 1907) was an officer of the United States Navy who served during and after the American Civil War.

== Biography ==
As a lieutenant commander in 1870

Kautz was born in Georgetown, Ohio, one of seven children of Johann George and Dorothy Kautz. When a child, his family moved to Levanna, where they farmed, growing grapes and tobacco.

Kautz entered the U.S. Naval Academy at Annapolis, Maryland, on September 28, 1854, and graduated with the rank of midshipman on June 11, 1858. He was promoted to passed midshipman on January 28, 1861, to master on February 28, then to lieutenant on April 21, 1861, soon after the start of the Civil War.

Kautz served aboard the steamer Flag, on blockade off Savannah, Georgia. On June 20, 1861, Flag captured the Confederate blockade runner Hannah Balch, and Kautz was given command of the prize, and ordered to take her to Philadelphia. However, his ship was recaptured by the Confederate privateer Coffee on June 25, and Kautz and his crew were taken prisoner. He gave his parole, and used his relative freedom to negotiate an exchange of prisoners. Finally, in November 1861, Kautz, John L. Worden, and another officer, plus 368 enlisted men were swapped for a similar number of Confederate prisoners. Eventually this process was formalised in the Dix–Hill Cartel of July 1862.

Kautz then was assigned to David Farragut's flagship Hartford in the Gulf of Mexico, and took part in the campaign to capture New Orleans, forcing a passage up the Mississippi past Forts Jackson and St. Philip and arriving at the city on April 25, 1862.

Farragut sent Captain Theodorus Bailey and Lieutenant George Perkins to meet John T. Monroe, the mayor of New Orleans, and demand the surrender of the city, the lowering of the state flag on the City Hall, and the raising of the flag of the United States over the Post Office, Custom House, and Mint. Monroe refused, claiming that only Major General Mansfield Lovell, the military commander in the city, had that authority. Lovell, however, having withdrawn his troops, passed the responsibility back to the civil authorities. Having failed in their mission Bailey and Perkins then had to leave City Hall by a back door, as an angry crowd attempted to kick down the front doors of City Hall, while calling for the two officers to be lynched.

The next day, April 26, Kautz and Midshipman John H. Read were sent to the City Hall with a formal written demand for the city's surrender. They were forced to leave their 20-strong Marine escort behind on the waterfront, and were led through a hostile crowd by a police officer to a meeting with Mayor Monroe, who once again declined to surrender. At the same time men from Pensacola had raised the Stars & Stripes over the Mint, which was promptly taken down by a group of citizens led by William B. Mumford, who ripped up the flag and flung it through the window of City Hall. For their own safety Kautz and Read left City Hall by a back door to a carriage, accompanied by Marion Baker, the mayor's secretary, and returned to their ship.

Monroe continued to temporize, despite Farragut's threats to bombard the city, until news of the surrender of Forts Jackson and St. Philip arrived on April 29. That day Kautz and Captain Henry H. Bell landed with a detachment of sailors, a battalion of marines, and two boat howitzers, and raised the flag over the Custom House and City Hall. New Orleans was finally officially captured.

He subsequently served aboard the steam sloop Juniata in the Gulf, and the steam gunboat Winooski. By early 1865, he was serving as executive officer of the sloop Cyane in the Pacific.

Kautz was promoted to lieutenant commander on May 31, 1865, then to commander on September 3, 1872, and to captain on June 2, 1885. Promoted to commodore on April 6, 1897, he served as President of the Naval Examining and Retiring Boards until October 1897, then as commander of Naval Station Newport until October 1898. On October 24, 1898, Kautz was promoted to rear admiral, and was appointed Commander-in-Chief of the Pacific Squadron. In March 1899, Kautz, flying his flag on Philadelphia, landed troops at Apia during the Second Samoan Civil War, and remained there until May. In February 1900 he transferred his flag to Iowa.

Kautz retired in January 1901, and he and his wife moved to Florence, Italy. He died there on February 6, 1907, and his ashes were returned to the United States aboard Baltimore for interment at Arlington National Cemetery.

== Personal life ==
He married Esther Hemphill (1844–1922), the sister of Rear Admiral Joseph N. Hemphill, and had one son, Albert Hemphill Kautz (1871–1933).
