= Mataʻafa Iosefo =

Samoan chief (1832–1912)

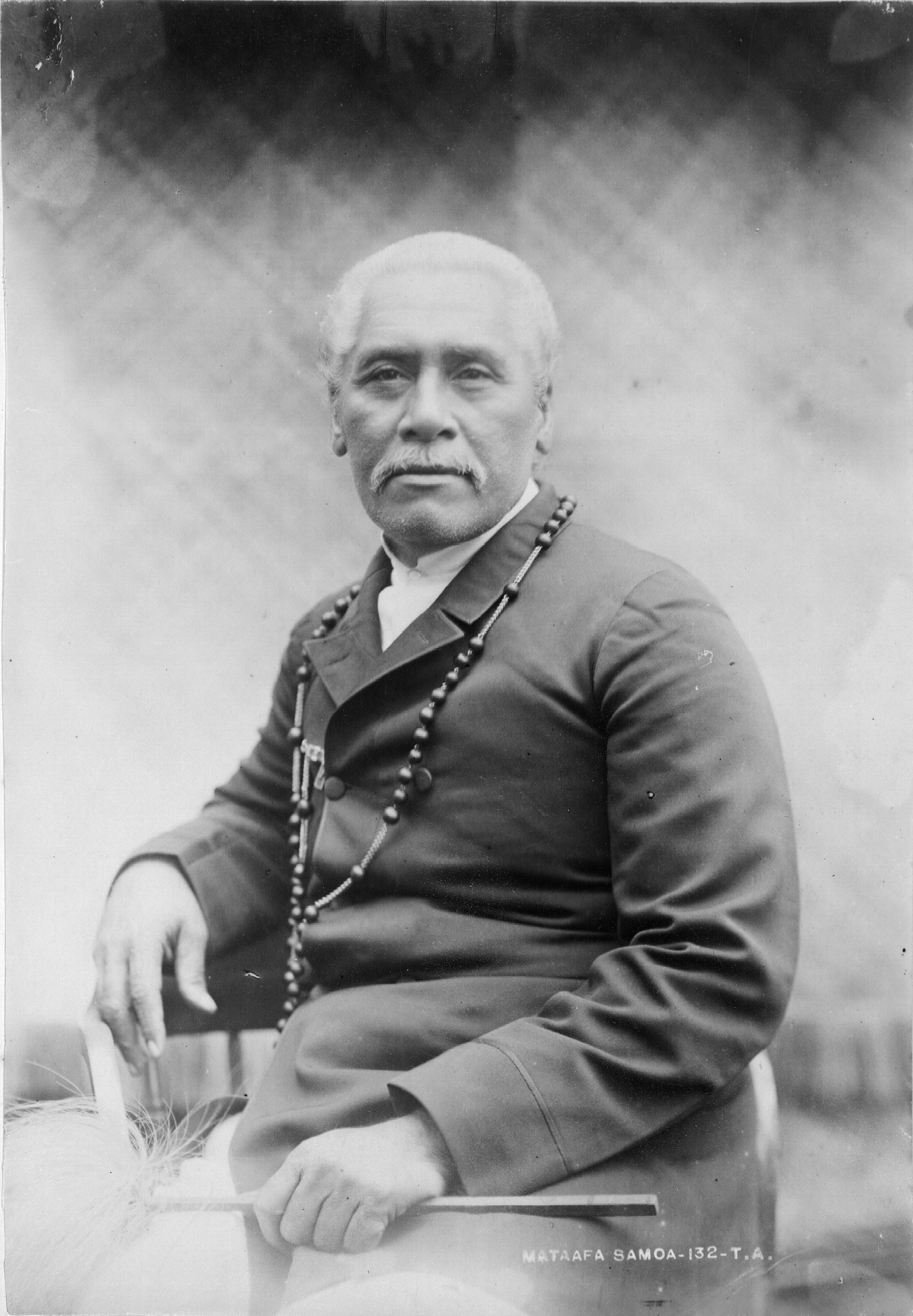
Mata'afa Iosefo c. 1896

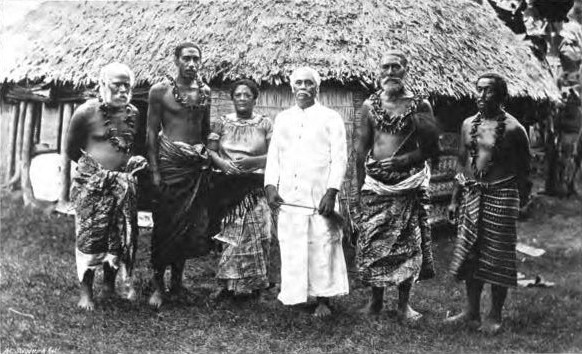
Mata'afa Iosefo & group c. 1902

Mata'afa Iosefo (c. 1832 – 6 February 1912) was a Paramount Chief of Samoa who was one of the three rival candidates for the kingship of Samoa during the colonial era. He was also referred to as Tupua Malietoa To'oa Mata'afa Iosefo. He was crowned the King of Samoa on 15 November 1898.

== History ==
The matai chiefly title Mata'afa is one of highest titles in Samoa. Iosefo was the individual's personal name.

From the late 19th century, Iosefo played a pivotal role during the country's colonial era when Germany, Great Britain and the United States were vying for control of the Samoa Islands. Each western power had their own chiefly candidate for the 'kingship' of Samoa, and Iosefo was Germany's preferred candidate.

In the late 19th century, Mata'afa Iosefo was exiled to the Marshall Islands and was permitted to return in 1898. The Germans upheld his claim for the kingship.

=== First Samoan Civil War ===
Mata'afa Iosefo first came into prominence in September 1888 when under his command, his followers rebelled against the German-backed Tamasese who was proclaimed Tafa'ifa or King of Samoa. A battle of the First Samoan Civil War saw Iosefo's warriors send Tamasese's forces retreating to Mulinuʻu Point where a German gunship offered protection. The ensuing bombardment of his villages saw Iosefo retaliate by wiping out an invading German contingent and plundering the German plantations at the First Battle of Vailele. Eventually, Germany, the United States and Britain agreed that Malietoa Laupepa would be restored as the Malietoa and Tafa'ifa of Samoa. Although Iosefo's actions during this period alienated Germany, the Germans' opinion of him improved during the period of his exile, leading them to eventually back Iosefo's campaign for kingship in the 1890s.^{:401–402}

=== Second Samoan Civil War ===
Iosefo was a major protagonist in the Second Samoan Civil War, an important proxy conflict in the leadup to the outbreak of World War I. During the conflict, Iosefo's German-backed faction waged a bloody conflict against Malietoa Tanumafili I, who was supported by forces from the United States and the British Empire. Iosefo achieved an early victory in the war by occupying Apia on 1 January 1899. In March, American admiral Albert Kautz attempted to oust Iosefo by declaring the abolition of his provisional government and ordering him out of Apia. Iosefo ignored Kautz's ultimatum, leading to an escalation of violence.^{:403–404} One particularly notable battle was the Second Battle of Vailele, in which the Mataafans defeated Samoan loyalists and a squadron of British and American warships, though suffering casualties both far larger than their opponents and extremely heavy by the standards of Samoan warfare.

In May 1899, British and German commissioners arrived to broker a ceasefire, and Iosefo agreed to disarm his forces as a condition of the negotiations.^{:406} His push for the kingship of Samoa was also supported by the early Mau movement led by orator Lauaki Namulauulu Mamoe. In the end, he was able to resist all attempts by the Allies to capture or kill him. As a result, the division of Samoa was agreed as a compromise. Germany obtained the western islands and created German Samoa, the U.S. annexed the eastern islands and created American Samoa, and the British withdrew their claim in exchange for concessions in the Solomon Islands.

In 1900, Iosefo was declared Ali'i Sili (highest chief) by the German Samoa colonial powers.^{:414} Iosefo succeeded his father, Mata'afa Tafagamanu, to the Mata'afa title.

=== Death ===
Following his death at Mulinuʻu in 1912, he was succeeded by Mata'afa Tupuola Iose.

== See also ==
- Mata'afa
- Fa'amatai, chiefly system of Samoa.
