= Norman Edsall =

USNavy sailor (1873–1899)

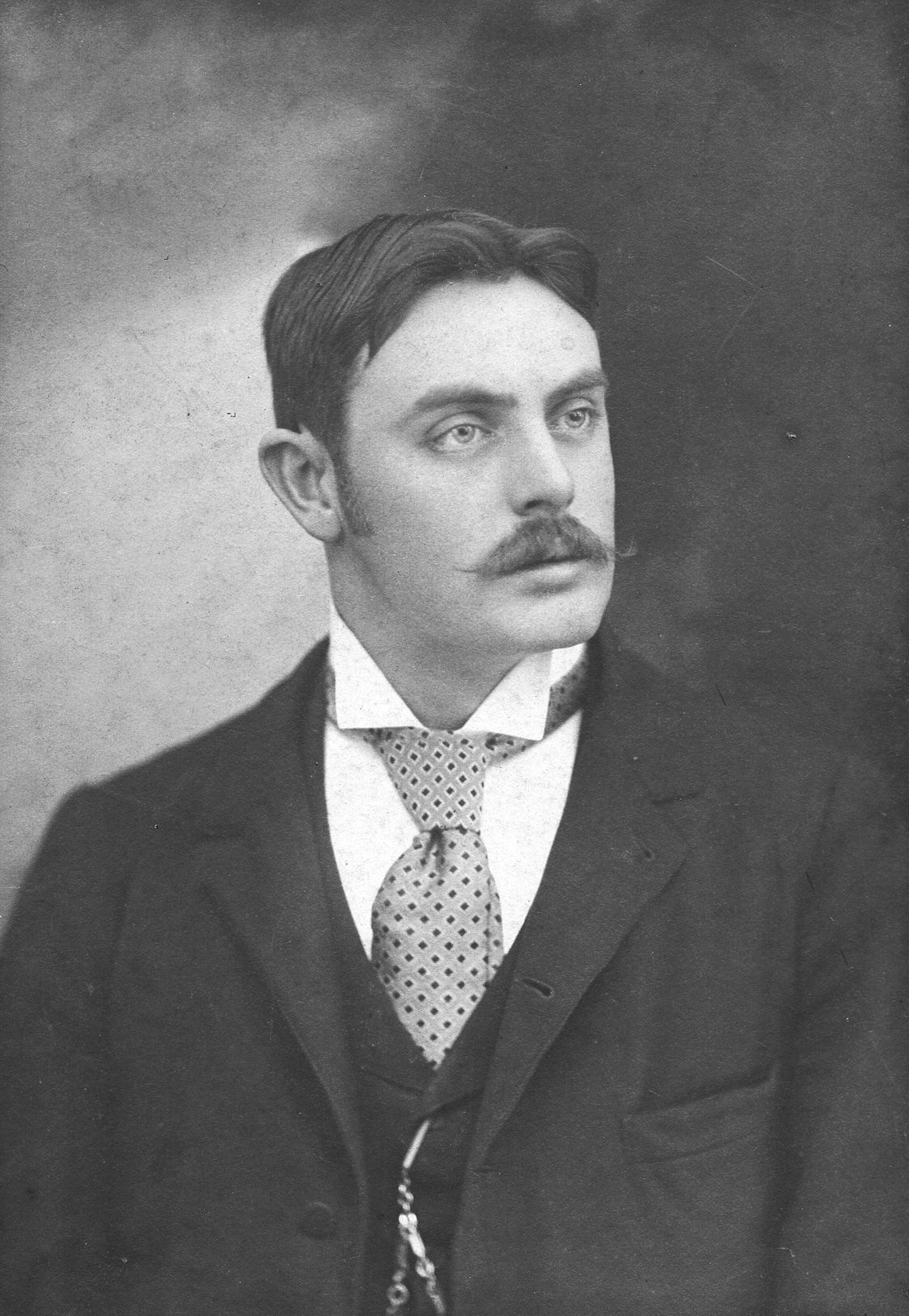
Portrait of Norman Edsall

Norman Eckley Edsall (3 June 1873 – 1 April 1899) was a sailor in the United States Navy during the Spanish–American War.

== Biography ==
Born in Columbus, Kentucky, Edsall enlisted in the U.S. Navy 27 June 1898. While serving on the protected cruiser USS Philadelphia, Seaman Edsall went ashore with a landing party on 1 April 1899 to suppress hostile natives near Vailele, Samoa. He was killed attempting to carry his wounded commander, Lieutenant Philip Lansdale, to safety, and is buried on Samoa.

== Legacy ==
Two U.S. Navy ships have been named USS Edsall (DD-219 and DE-129) in his honor.

== See also ==
- Second Samoan Civil War
- John R. Monaghan
- Philip Lansdale
