= Michael Joseph McNally =

United States Navy Medal of Honor recipient

- Born: June 29, 1860; Manhattan, New York, US
- Died: November 2, 1916 (aged 56); Chesapeake Bay
- Burial place: Portsmouth, Virginia
- Military career
- Allegiance: United States
- Branch: United States Marine Corps
- Service years: 1897–1915
- Rank: Sergeant Major
- Conflicts: Second Samoan Civil War • First Battle of Vailele
- Awards: Medal of Honor

Michael Joseph McNally (June 29, 1860 – November 2, 1916) was a United States Marine Sergeant who received the Medal of Honor for actions during the Second Samoan Civil War. McNally was part of a joint British, American and Samoan expedition against Samoan rebels on Upolu, Samoa in mid-1899. He fought at the First Battle of Vailele on April 1, 1899, and was subsequently awarded the Medal of Honor along with Private Henry L. Hulbert. Both McNally's and Hulbert's citations incorrectly list them as serving in the Philippines during the time of their distinguished service though they served on USS Philadelphia (C-4), which was never dispatched to fight in the Philippine–American War.

McNally joined the Marine Corps from Mare Island, California in December 1897, and retired in January 1915. On the night of 1 and 2 November 1916, he disappeared from a Baltimore Steam Packet Company steamer; his body was recovered some three weeks later, and he was buried in Portsmouth, Virginia.

== Medal of Honor citation ==
Rank and organization: Sergeant, U.S. Marine Corps. Born: June 29, 1860, New York, N.Y. Accredited to: California. G.O. No.: 55, July 19, 1901.
Citation:

For distinguished conduct in the presence of the enemy at Samoa, Philippine Islands, 1 April 1899.

== See also ==
- List of Medal of Honor recipients
- List of people who disappeared mysteriously at sea

== Awards ==
- "Medal of Honor recipients of the Philippines". United States Army Center of Military History. Archived from the original on 2008-04-20.

== Note ==
McNally is sometimes erroneously referred to as Michael L. McNally.
