= USS Lansdale =

USS Lansdale may refer to the following ships of the United States Navy:

- USS Lansdale (DD-101), a destroyer commissioned in 1919 and decommissioned in 1931
- USS Lansdale (DD-426), a destroyer commissioned in 1940 and sunk by German bombers on 20 April 1944
- USS Lansdale (DD-766), launched in 1946, but never saw active service. Her bow was removed to service Floyd B. Parks (DD-884); struck in 1958.
