= John R. Monaghan =

US Navy officer (1873–1899)

John Robert Monaghan
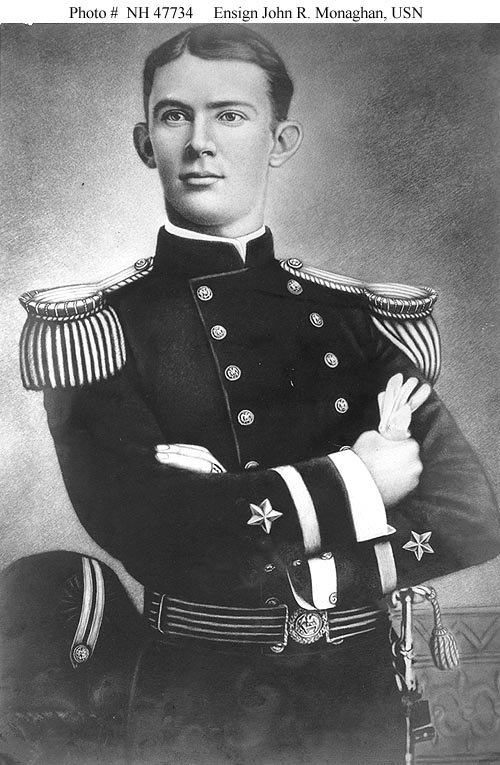
- Born: 26 March 1873; Chewelah, Washington
- Died: 1 April 1899 (aged 26); Vailele, Samoa
- Military career
- Allegiance: United States of America
- Branch: United States Navy
- Service years: 1895–1899
- Rank: Ensign
- Conflicts: Spanish–American War: Pacific Theater; Second Samoan Civil War: Second Battle of Vailele

Ensign John R. Monaghan (26 March 1873 – 1 April 1899) was an officer in the United States Navy during the Spanish–American War.

== Biography ==
Born in Chewelah, Washington Territory Monaghan was a part of the first graduating class of Gonzaga University, and ultimately graduated from the Naval Academy in June 1895. For the next two years, as a Passed Midshipman, he served in the cruiser USS Olympia (C-6), flagship of the U.S. Asiatic Station. Promoted to the rank of Ensign in July 1897, he was next assigned to the monitor Monadnock and gunboat USS Alert (AS-4), both of which operated along the West Coast of the Americas. In July 1898, during the Spanish–American War, he became an officer of the cruiser USS Philadelphia (C-4), which was then the Pacific Station's flagship.

In March 1899 Ensign Monaghan, onboard Philadelphia, was sent to the troubled Samoan Islands. On 1 April, while serving ashore with a combined unit of British, Americans and Samoans, his force was ambushed by another group of rebel Samoans. When his unit's leader, Lieutenant Philip Lansdale, was wounded, Ensign Monaghan seized a rifle and attempted to rescue the injured officer.

The official report of the action stated: "The men were not in sufficient numbers to hold out any longer, and they were forced along by a fire which it was impossible to withstand. Ensign Monaghan did stand. He stood steadfast by his wounded superior and friend—one rifle against many, one brave man against a score of savages. He knew he was doomed. He could not yield. He died in heroic performance of duty."

== Legacy ==
A statue commemorating his death was erected in 1906 in downtown Spokane, Washington and has since been moved to Fairmont Memorial Park. The inscription reads: "During the retreat of the allied forces from the deadly fire and overwhelming number of the savage foe, he alone stood the fearful onslaught and sacrificed his life defending a wounded comrade Lieutenant Philip V. Lansdale United States Navy." This statue was removed April 29, 2026 and it is set to be relocated to the Monaghan mausoleum at Fairmount Memorial Park.

Legend has it that Monaghan's ghost haunts the Monaghan Music Mansion located on Gonzaga University's campus.

== Namesake ==
Two ships, USS Monaghan, have been named for him.

== See also ==
- Philip Lansdale
- Norman Edsall
