= USS Edsall =

Two ships of United States Navy have been named USS Edsall:

- USS Edsall (DD-219), a Clemson-class destroyer, in commission from 1920 to 1942
- USS Edsall (DE-129), the lead ship of her class of destroyer escort, in commission from 1943 to 1946
