= Philip Lansdale =

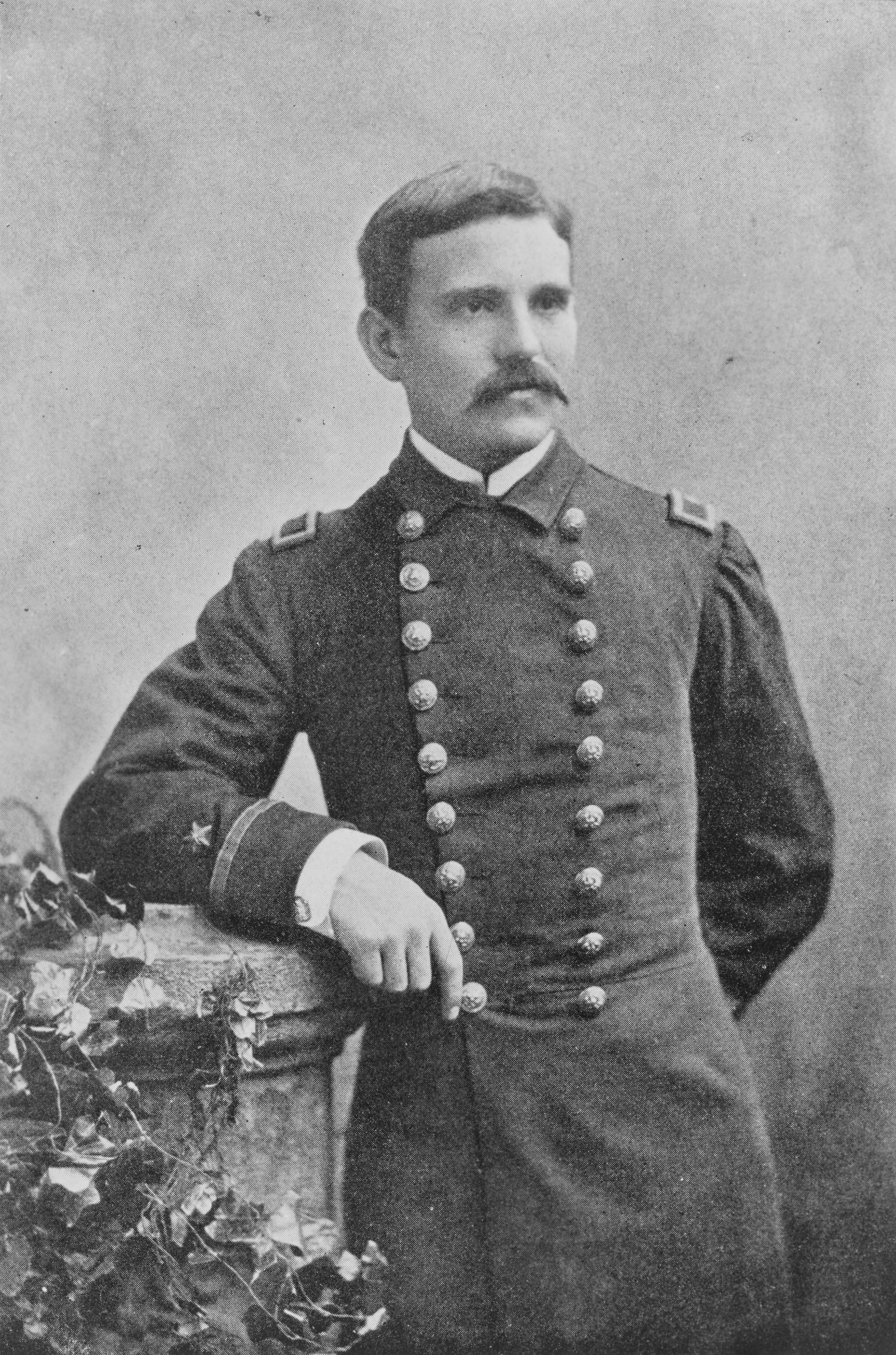
Philip Lansdale at around the time of his death

Philip Van Horne Lansdale (15 February 1858 – 1 April 1899) was an officer in the United States Navy.

== Biography ==
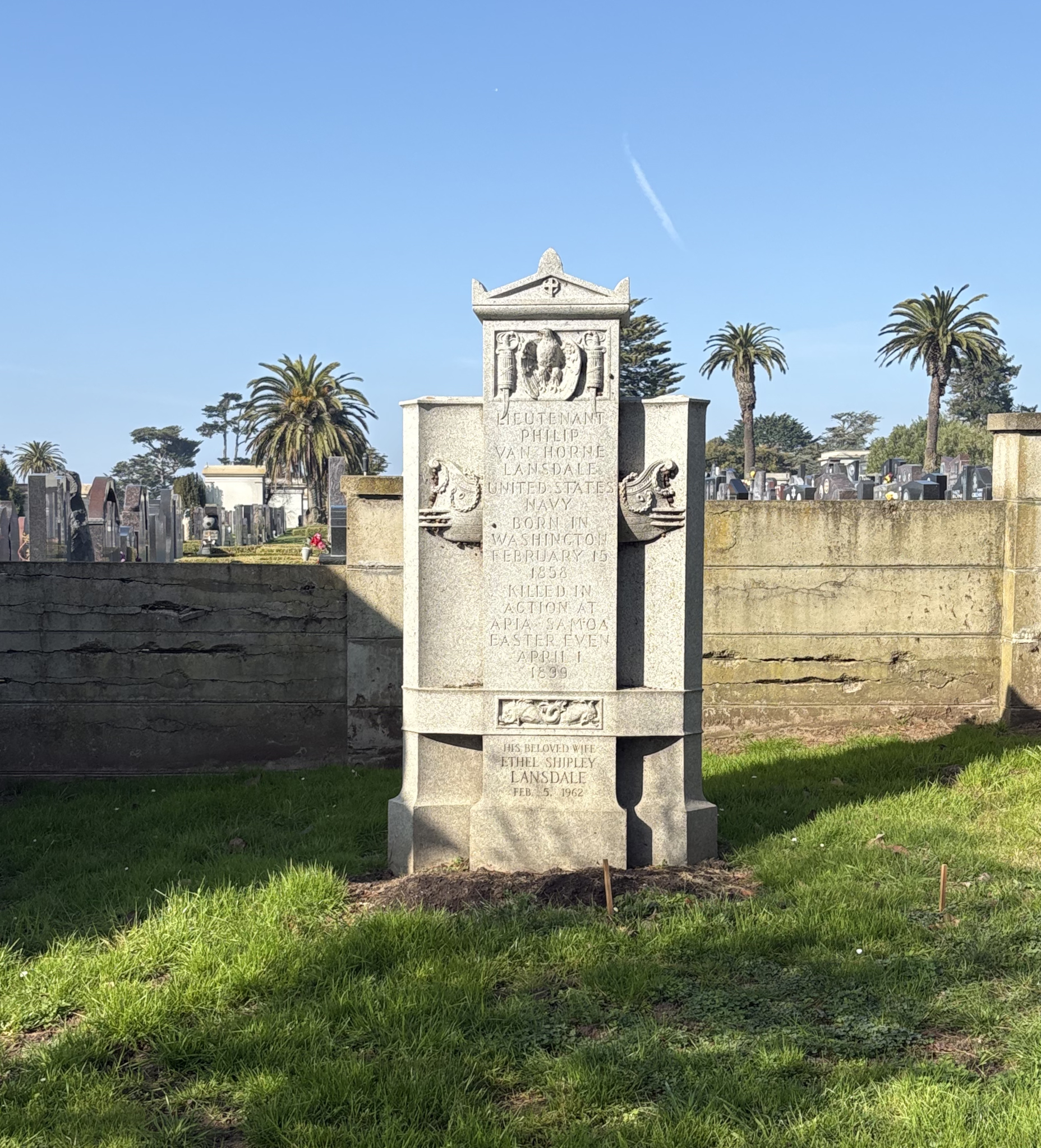
Lansdale's grave at Cypress Lawn Memorial Park

Lansdale, born in Washington, D.C., graduated as Passed Midshipman from the Naval Academy 18 June 1879. Commissioned ensign 1 June 1881, he served on Asiatic, North Atlantic, and with the Mediterranean and Pacific Squadrons. Promoted to lieutenant 15 May 1893, he became executive officer of the protected cruiser USS Philadelphia upon her recommissioning at San Francisco 9 July 1898.

After visiting Honolulu for ceremonies which transferred the sovereignty of the Hawaiian Islands to the United States, Philadelphia, flagship of Rear Admiral Albert Kautz, Commander, Pacific Station, arrived in Apia, Samoa, 6 March 1899. An unstable political climate, created by rival Samoan factions and German presence, erupted into open hostility during the month. A combined American and British naval force sought to keep the peace, but natives attacked American and British consulates late in March.

A British and American landing party set out from Apia in late March. On 1 April during a mission to drive off the forces under King Mataafa, with Lieutenant Lansdale in command, the landing party was ambushed and forced to retreat after a fierce fight near Vailele.

While protecting the evacuation of a mortally wounded machinegunner, Lieutenant Lansdale was seriously wounded, his right leg shattered by an enemy bullet. Ensign John R. Monaghan, Seaman Norman Edsall and another sailor, began carrying Lansdale. Both enlisted men were killed and Monaghan had dropped from exhaustion when Lansdale pled, "Monny, you leave me now, I cannot go any further"; Ensign Monaghan remained beside the fallen lieutenant. With only one rifle between them, they were soon overrun and killed by the pursuing Mataafan Samoan forces.

He was buried at Cypress Lawn Memorial Park in Colma, California.

== Namesakes ==
Three U.S. ships (DD-101, DD-426, DD-766) have been named USS Lansdale for him.

== See also ==
- Norman Edsall
- John R. Monaghan
