= USS Monaghan (DD-32) =

Paulding-class destroyer

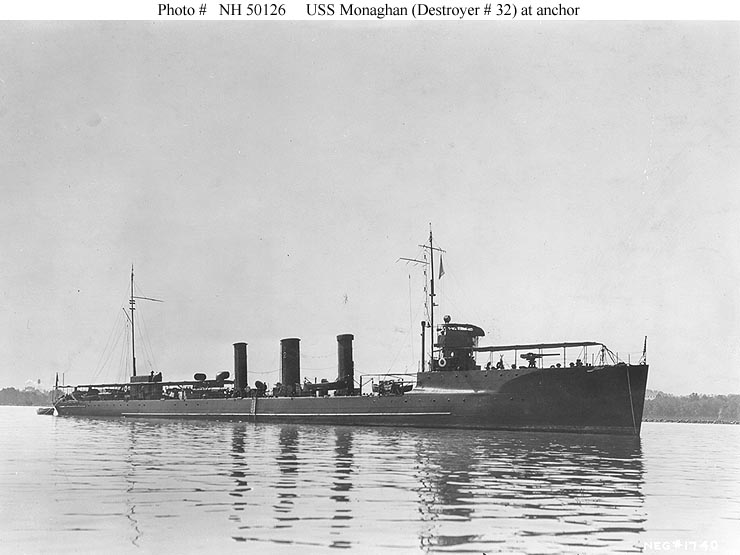
- USS Monaghan (DD-32) at anchor, circa 1912.

History

United States
- Name: Monaghan
- Namesake: Ensign John R. Monaghan
- Builder: Newport News Shipbuilding Company, Newport News, Virginia
- Cost: $644,102.64
- Laid down: 1 June 1910
- Launched: 18 February 1911
- Sponsored by: Mrs. Frank J. Gavin, sister of the late Ens. Monaghan
- Commissioned: 21 June 1911
- Decommissioned: 4 November 1919
- Stricken: 5 July 1934
- Identification: Hull symbol:DD-32; Code letters:NKL
- Fate: transferred to the United States Coast Guard, 7 June 1924; sold and broken up for scrap in 1934
- Notes: Monaghan lost her name to new construction on 1 July 1933

United States
- Name: Monaghan
- Acquired: 7 June 1924
- Commissioned: 30 June 1925
- Decommissioned: 29 January 1931
- Identification: Hull symbol:CG-15
- Fate: returned to the US Navy

General characteristics
- Class & type: Paulding-class destroyer
- Displacement: 742 long tons (754 t) normal; 887 long tons (901 t) full load
- Length: 293 ft 10 in (89.56 m)
- Beam: 27 ft (8.2 m)
- Draft: 8 ft 4 in (2.54 m) (mean)
- Installed power: 12,000 ihp (8,900 kW)
- Propulsion: 4 × boilers; 3 × Parsons Direct Drive Turbines; 3 × shafts
- Speed: 29.5 kn (33.9 mph; 54.6 km/h); 30.45 kn (35.04 mph; 56.39 km/h) (Speed on Trial)
- Complement: 4 officers 87 enlisted
- Armament: 5 × 3 in (76 mm)/50 caliber guns; 6 × 18 inch (450 mm) torpedo tubes (3 × 2)

The first USS Monaghan (DD-32) was a modified Paulding-class destroyer in the United States Navy during World War I and later in the United States Coast Guard, designated (CG-15). She was named for Ensign John R. Monaghan.

Monaghan was laid down on 1 June 1910 by Newport News Shipbuilding Company, Newport News, Virginia; launched on 18 February 1911; sponsored by Mrs. F. J. Gavin, sister of Ensign Monaghan; and commissioned on 21 June 1911, Lieutenant Commander W. P. Cronan in command.

== World War I ==
Joining the Atlantic Fleet, Monaghan took part in fleet readiness training and operations which prepared the US Navy to enter action immediately when its country joined the Allies in World War I. Monaghan's first war service was on patrol along the Atlantic coast; she then escorted troop convoys through the dangerous mid-ocean section of their crossings. From November 1917 until the Armistice a year later, Monaghan made antisubmarine patrols against the U-boat menace in European waters. Returning from occupation duty, Monaghan decommissioned at Philadelphia on 4 November 1919.

== Inter-war period ==
Monaghan was transferred to the Coast Guard on 7 June 1924 to serve in the Rum Patrol. She was stationed at New London, Connecticut until she was sent to Boston, Massachusetts in 1930.

She was returned to the Navy on 8 May 1931. Her name was dropped on 1 July 1933 so that it might be assigned to a new destroyer, and she was sold to Michael Flynn of Brooklyn, New York on 22 August 1934 for scrapping in accordance with the London Naval Treaty.
