= USS Monaghan =

USS Monaghan may refer to the following ships of the United States Navy:

- USS Monaghan (DD-32), was a modified Paulding-class destroyer launched in 1911 and served in World War I then served in the United States Coast Guard from 1924 to 1930
- USS Monaghan (DD-354), was a Farragut-class destroyer launched in 1935 and sunk during a typhoon in December 1944
