= USS Floyd B. Parks =

Gearing-class destroyer

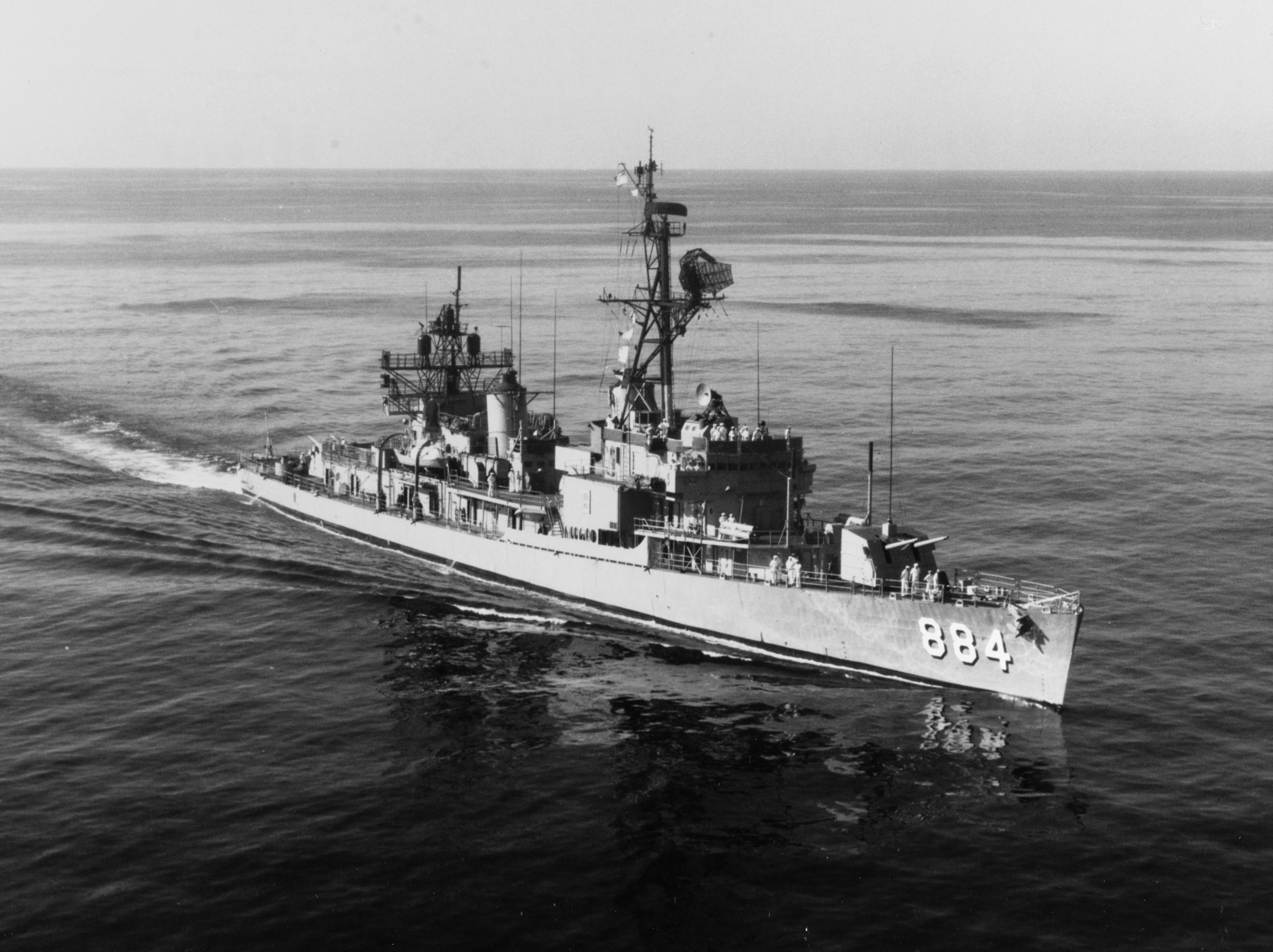
- USS Floyd B. Parks (DD-884), in 1971

History

United States
- Name: USS Floyd B. Parks
- Namesake: Floyd B. Parks
- Laid down: 30 October 1944
- Launched: 31 March 1945
- Commissioned: 31 July 1945
- Decommissioned: 2 July 1973
- Stricken: 2 July 1973
- Identification: Callsign: NBIC; Hull number: DD-884
- Fate: Sold for scrap, 1 April 1974

General characteristics
- Class & type: Gearing-class destroyer
- Displacement: 2,616 tons (2,658 t) standard; 3,460 tons (3,516 t) full load
- Length: 390.5 ft (119.0 m)
- Beam: 40.9 ft (12.5 m)
- Draft: 14.3 ft (4.4 m)
- Propulsion: 2 shaft; General Electric steam turbines; 4 boilers; 60,000 shp (45,000 kW)
- Speed: 36.8 knots (68.2 km/h; 42.3 mph)
- Range: 4,500 nmi (8,300 km; 5,200 mi) at 20 knots (37 km/h; 23 mph)
- Complement: 336
- Armament: 6 × 5-inch 38 caliber anti-aircraft guns; 12 × 40 mm anti-aircraft guns; 11 × 20 mm anti-aircraft guns; 10 × 21 inch (533 mm) torpedo tubes

USS Floyd B. Parks (DD-884) was a Gearing-class destroyer in service with the United States Navy from 1945 to 1973. She was scrapped in 1974.

== History ==
The destroyer was laid down by the Consolidated Steel Corporation at Orange, Texas on 30 October 1944, launched on 31 March 1945 by Mrs. Floyd B. Parks, widow of Major Parks and commissioned on 31 July 1945.

Floyd B. Parks arrived at San Diego, her home port, 16 November 1945, and sailed 20 November for her first tour of duty in the Far East, patrolling the coast of China and operating in the Marianas Islands until her return to San Diego 11 February 1947. In the period prior to the outbreak of war in Korea, Floyd B. Parks twice more deployed to the Far East for duty with the US 7th Fleet, returning from her second such cruise 13 June 1950, just before the North Koreans crossed the 38th parallel. At once she prepared to return to duty as a standby at Pearl Harbor, available should war spread, returning to San Diego 20 August.

=== Korean War ===
Floyd B. Parks operated with the Seventh Fleet in support of United Nations Forces during the Korean War. She sailed from San Diego 19 February 1951 to join in United Nations operations in Korea. On 16 March she joined the fast carrier task force, screening them during air operations off the east coast as well as spending a total of 60 days in Wonsan Harbor on blockade and bombardment duty. She returned to San Diego 10 October 1951, and after west coast operations, sailed for duty in the Far East again 31 May 1952. Along with duty similar to that of her first war cruise, she patrolled in the South China Sea and the Taiwan Strait.

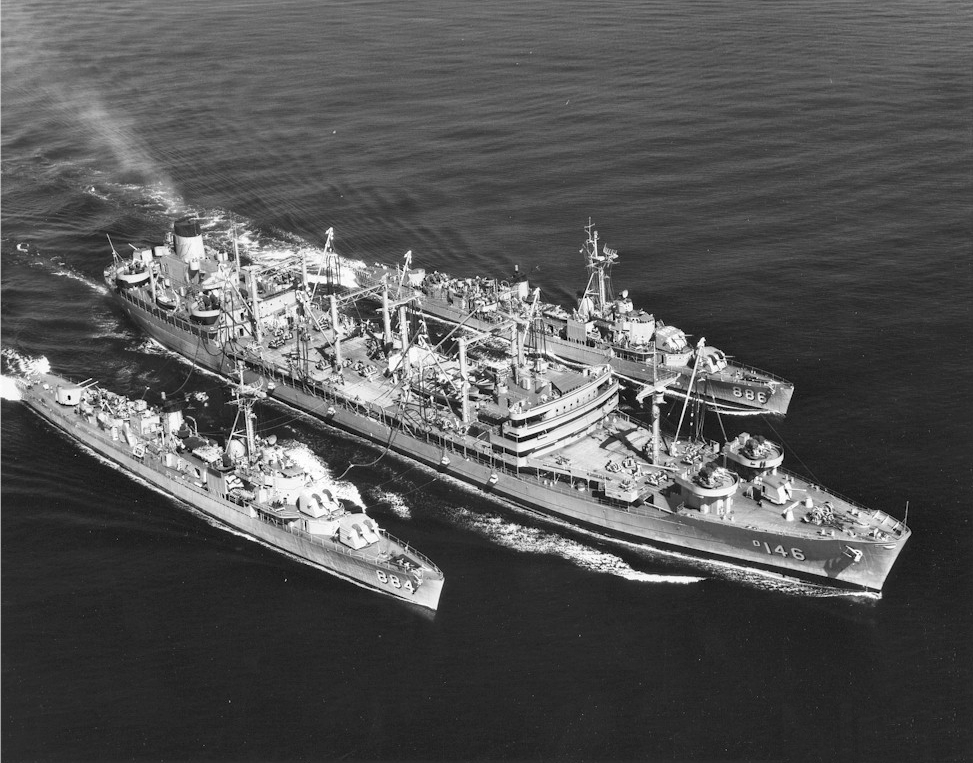
USS Kawishiwi refueling Floyd B. Parks and USS Orleck in the late 1950s.

=== Cold War ===
During her 1955 Far Eastern cruise, Floyd B. Parks took part in evacuation of the Dachen Islands during the First Taiwan Strait Crisis, and while in the Orient once more 11 March 1956, collided with the heavy cruiser USS Columbus, losing two men and a 40-foot (12 m) section of her bow. Skillful work by her crew saved their ship, and brought her safely into Naval Station Subic Bay for temporary repairs. Upon her return to Long Beach Naval Shipyard 14 May 1956, Floyd B. Parks' damaged bow was replaced with that of the uncompleted destroyer USS Lansdale and after completion of repairs and installation of new equipment Floyd B. Parks returned to her west coast-Far East rotation through 1962. She then entered the Puget Sound Naval Shipyard and underwent an extensive Fleet Rehabilitation and Modernization (FRAM) overhaul until February 1963.

=== Vietnam War ===
During the Vietnam War, Floyd B. Parks served as plane guard for aircraft carriers on Yankee Station in the Tonkin Gulf, participated in Operation Sea Dragon, patrolled on search and rescue duties, and carried out naval gunfire support missions.

Floyd B. Parks was decommissioned on 2 July 1973, stricken from the Naval Vessel Register on 2 July 1973, and sold for scrapping on 29 April 1974.
