= USS Israel =

Wickes-class destroyer

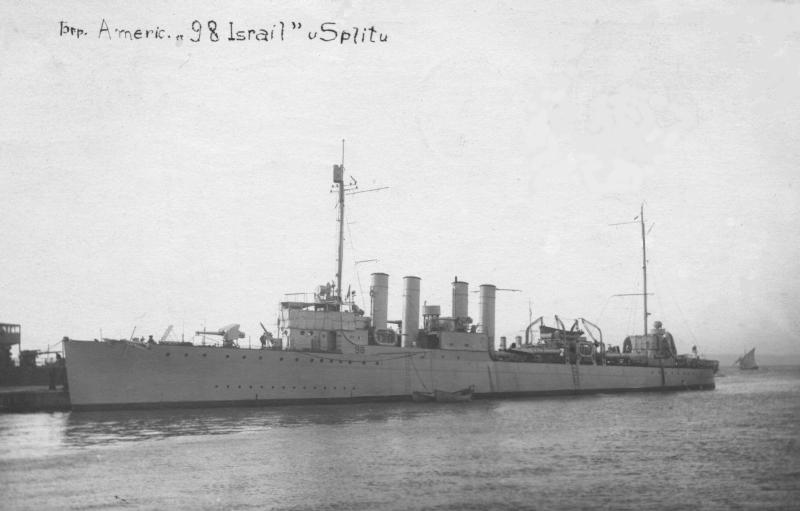
- USS Israel at Split, Yugoslavia

History

United States
- Name: Israel
- Namesake: Joseph Israel
- Builder: Fore River Shipyard, Quincy, Massachusetts
- Laid down: 26 January 1918
- Launched: 22 June 1918
- Commissioned: 13 September 1918
- Decommissioned: 7 July 1922
- Reclassified: 17 July 1920, DM-3
- Stricken: 1 December 1936
- Fate: Sold, 18 April 1939 for scrapping

General characteristics
- Class & type: Wickes-class destroyer
- Displacement: 1,060 tons
- Length: 314 ft 5 in (95.8 m)
- Beam: 31 ft 9 in (9.7 m)
- Draft: 8 ft 6 in (2.6 m)
- Speed: 35 knots (65 km/h)
- Complement: 113 officers and enlisted
- Armament: 4 × 4 in (100 mm) guns; 2 × 1-pounders; 12 × 21 in (533 mm) torpedo tubes

The first USS Israel (DD-98) was a Wickes-class destroyer in the United States Navy during World War I and the years following.

== Namesake ==
Joseph Israel was born c. 1780. He entered the Navy as a midshipman on 15 January 1801. He served on USS Maryland during the Quasi-War with France and on USS Chesapeake, USS New York and USS Constitution during the First Barbary War. Midshipman Israel was killed on 4 September 1804, when ketch USS Intrepid exploded in the harbor of Tripoli during a night operation to destroy the enemy shipping led by Lieutenant Richard Somers.

A monument to the memory of Israel and his fellow officers and men stands on the grounds of the United States Naval Academy at Annapolis. Israel was reported to be of the Jewish faith, although "there was no evidence that Israel is a Jew or of Jewish ancestry."

== History ==
Israel was launched on 22 June 1918 by the Fore River Shipbuilding Corporation, Quincy, Massachusetts, sponsored by Miss Dorothy Brown. The destroyer was commissioned on 13 September 1918.

Following shakedown out of Boston, Israel rendezvoused with the battleship South Carolina at Newport, Rhode Island on 24 September 1918, and performed escort duty on the East Coast as a unit of the Destroyer Force, Atlantic Fleet. She departed New York on 13 October with a convoy, and arrived at Gibraltar on 6 November, via the Azores and Port Leixoes, Portugal. Having escorted the Brazilian Detachment to Gibraltar Harbour on 9 November, Israel arrived at Venice on 18 November and joined the Eastern Mediterranean Forces. On 1 April 1919, she was in Spalato, now Split, with Olympia and Lansdale. She operated out of Venice and Split as a station ship transporting supplies and personnel until 12 July 1919 when she departed Villefranche, France, via Gibraltar and the Azores, arriving at Boston on 24 July.

While undergoing overhaul at the Portsmouth Navy Yard, Israel was fitted out as a light minelayer and her classification changed 17 July 1920 to DM-3.

Sailing from Portsmouth, New Hampshire on 4 March 1921, Israel cruised along the East Coast until 5 July when she joined Mine Squadron 1, Atlantic Fleet, at Gloucester, Massachusetts. During the remainder of the year she engaged in mining practice and exercises on the East Coast; and from January to April 1922, participated in fleet exercises based at Guantanamo Bay, Cuba and Culebra, Puerto Rico.

Israel arrived in Philadelphia 15 May 1922 and decommissioned there 7 July. Remaining inactive during the following years, she was reduced to a hulk in 1936 in accordance with the London Treaty. Her name was struck from the Navy List on 25 January 1937, and she was sold to the Union Shipbuilding Company, Baltimore, Maryland for scrap on 18 April 1939.
