= USS Philadelphia (C-4) =

US naval vessel (1890–1902)

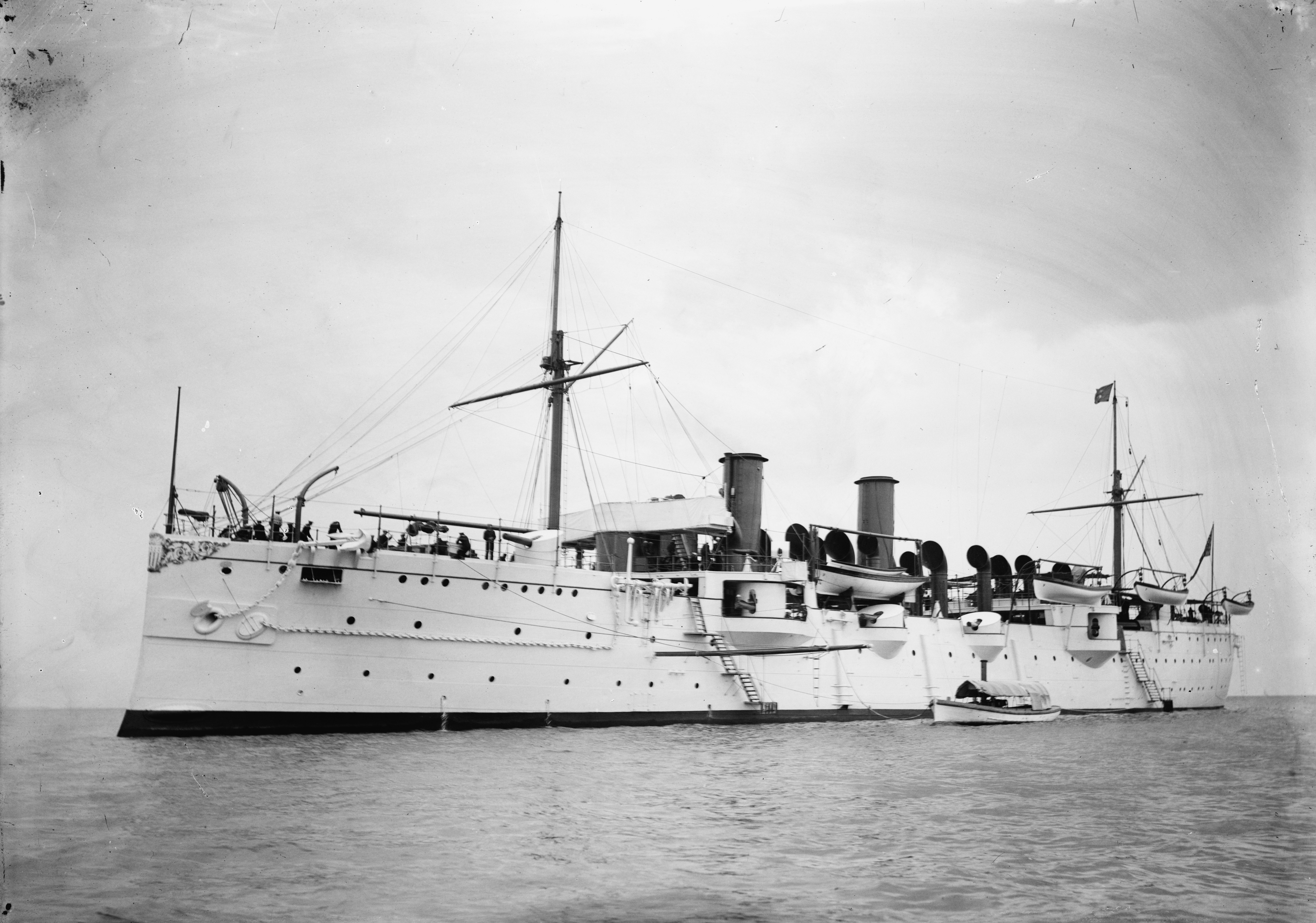
- Protected steel cruiser USS Philadelphia

History

United States
- Name: Philadelphia
- Namesake: Philadelphia, Pennsylvania
- Builder: William Cramp & Sons, Philadelphia
- Yard number: 257
- Laid down: 22 March 1888
- Launched: 7 September 1889
- Sponsored by: Miss Minnie Wanamaker, daughter of merchant and philanthropist John Wanamaker
- Commissioned: 28 July 1890
- Decommissioned: 22 September 1902
- Notes: housed over as receiving ship 1904
- Reclassified: Receiving ship, 12 May 1904
- Reclassified: Prison ship, 4 November 1912
- Reclassified: Receiving Ship, 19 January 1916
- Reclassified: IX-24, 17 July 1920
- Stricken: 24 November 1926
- Identification: Hull symbol: C-4; Hull symbol: IX-24
- Fate: Sold, 1927

General characteristics (as built)
- Type: Protected cruiser
- Displacement: 4,324 long tons (4,393 t) (standard); 5,304 long tons (5,389 t) (full load)
- Length: 335 ft (102 m) oa; 327 ft 6 in (99.82 m)pp
- Beam: 48 ft 6 in (14.78 m)
- Draft: 19 ft 6 in (5.94 m) (mean draft); 23 ft 6 in (7.16 m) (max draft)
- Installed power: 9 × steam boilers; 2 × Horizontal triple-expansion steam engines; 10,500 ihp (7,800 kW)
- Propulsion: 2 × screws
- Speed: 19 knots (35 km/h; 22 mph); 19.91 kn (22.91 mph; 36.87 km/h) (speed on trial)
- Range: 6,354 nmi (11,768 km; 7,312 mi) at 10 kn (19 km/h; 12 mph)
- Complement: 384 officers and enlisted
- Armament: 12 × 6-inch (152 mm)/30 caliber breech-loading rifles; 4 × 6-pounder (57 mm (2.2 in)) guns; 4 × 3-pounder (47 mm (1.9 in)) guns; 2 × 1-pounder (37 mm (1.5 in)) guns; 2 × .45 caliber (11.4 mm) Gatling guns
- Armor: Gun shields: 3 in (76 mm); Main deck: 4 in (100 mm); Conning Tower: 3 in (76 mm)

General characteristics (1914)
- Installed power: 9 × boilers; 8,688 ihp (6,479 kW) (ihp on trials)
- Complement: 187 enlisted men
- Armament: all armaments removed
- Notes: ship listed as "Unserviceable for War Purposes"

The fourth USS Philadelphia (C-4) (later IX-24) was the sixth protected cruiser of the United States Navy. Although designed by the Navy Department, her hull was similar to the preceding British-designed Baltimore, but Philadelphia had a uniform main armament of twelve 6-inch guns.

She was laid down 22 March 1888 by William Cramp & Sons, Philadelphia, launched 7 September 1889, sponsored by Miss Minnie Wanamaker, daughter of merchant and philanthropist John Wanamaker; and commissioned 28 July 1890, Capt. Albert S. Barker in command.

== Design and construction ==
Philadelphia was built to Navy Department plans, with twelve 6-inch (152 mm)/30 caliber guns. Two guns each were on the bow and stern, with the remainder in sponsons along the sides. Secondary armament was four 6-pounder (57 mm (2.2 in)) guns, four 3-pounder (47 mm (1.85 in)) Hotchkiss revolving cannon, two 1-pounder (37 mm (1.5 in)) Hotchkiss revolving cannon, and two .45 caliber (11.4 mm) Gatling guns. Some of the weapons listed as Hotchkiss revolving cannon may actually have been rapid-firing guns. Four 14-inch (356 mm) torpedo tubes were included in the design but never mounted.

References vary as to the ship's armor. Philadelphia probably had 3 in (76 mm) gun shields and a 3 in (76 mm) conning tower. The armored deck was up to 4 in (100 mm) thick.

The engineering plant included an unusual mix of boilers: four Scotch return-tube double-ended, one single-ended, and four locomotive boilers. These produced 160 psi (1,100 kPa) steam for two horizontal triple expansion engines totaling 10,500 ihp (7,800 kW) (designed) for a designed speed of 19 knots (35 km/h; 22 mph). This speed was attained on trials but the trial horsepower was only 8,814 ihp (6,573 kW). As with other contemporary Navy Department designs, sails were fitted but soon removed. Philadelphia carried 525 tons of coal for a designed range of 6,354 nmi (11,768 km; 7,312 mi) at 10 kn (19 km/h; 12 mph).

The ship's 6-inch guns were converted to rapid-firing in 1898. All armament was removed when Philadelphia was converted into a receiving ship in 1904.

== Service history ==
=== Atlantic Squadron, 1890–1893 ===
While fitting out at the New York Navy Yard, Philadelphia was designated on 18 August as flagship of Rear Admiral Bancroft Gherardi, commanding the North Atlantic Squadron. The squadron departed New York on 19 January 1891 to cruise the West Indies for the protection of American interests until May. It was during this time Fred J. Buenzle had served aboard the Philadelphia, as noted in Bluejacket; An Autobiography, a part of the Classics of Naval Literature series. Then to the northern waters as far as Halifax, Nova Scotia. Early the following year, the flagship called at Montevideo, Uruguay, 6–18 February, after which she resumed cruising in the West Indies.

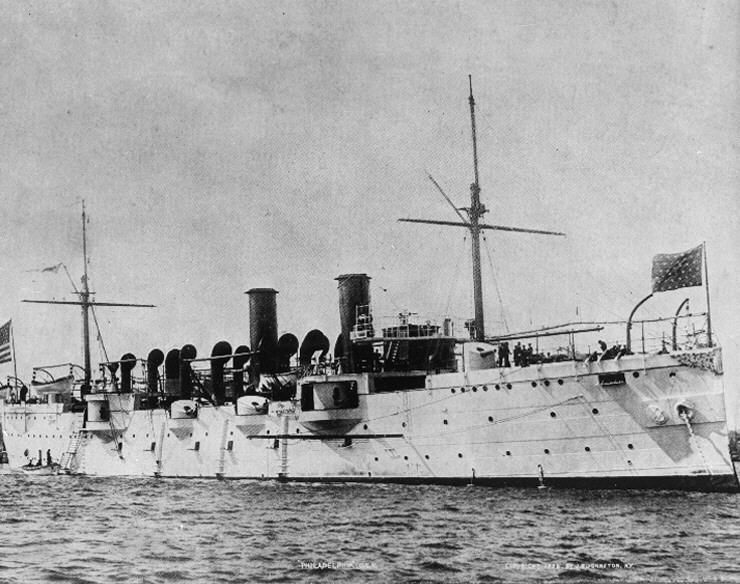
USS Philadelphia at sea

Philadelphia continued operations with the Atlantic Squadron along the eastern seaboard of the United States and in the West Indies until 1 March 1893. She was then assigned to the Naval Review Fleet as flagship of Rear Admiral Bancroft Gherardi. Charged with conducting the International Rendezvous and Review, with a fleet of twelve American ships, he received the visiting foreign ships as they commenced arrival in Hampton Roads on 8 April. The fleet steamed to New York 24 April, where it joined additional foreign visitors to form a combined fleet of 35 men-of-war. President Grover Cleveland reviewed the Fleet 27 April, after which appropriately festive ceremonies took place, initiating a parade through the streets of New York. The Naval Review Fleet disbanded 31 May and Philadelphia departed New York 30 June 1893, bound for the Pacific Squadron via Rio de Janeiro, Brazil, and Callao, Peru.

=== Pacific Station, 1893–1902 ===
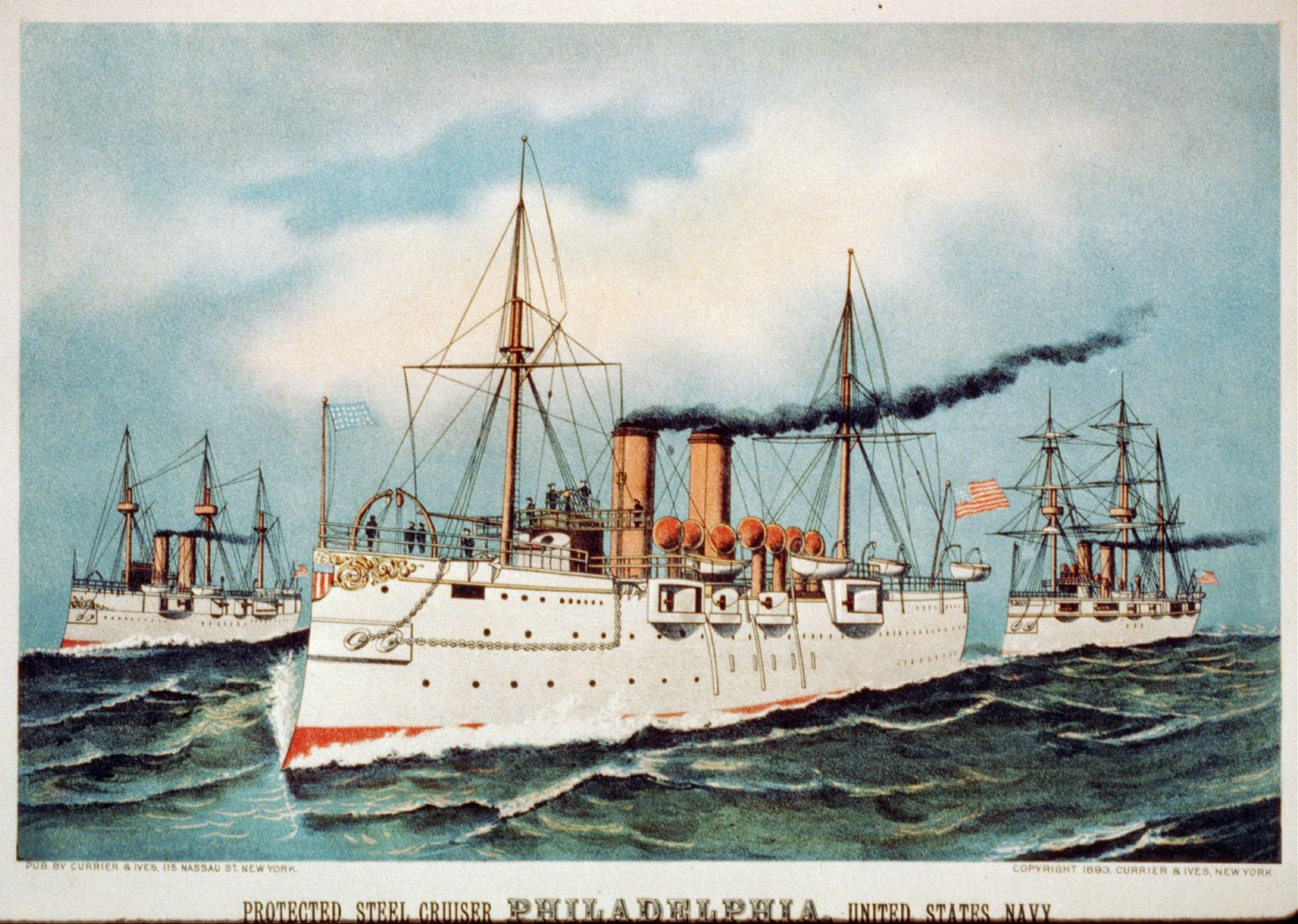
Painting of the ship c. 1893

Philadelphia arrived San Francisco 22 August 1893. As the flagship of the Commander-in-Chief, Pacific Station, she cruised with the squadron, engaging in drills and maneuvers, and visiting various ports on the west coast of the United States, Mexico, and South America, and in the Hawaiian Islands. She arrived at the Mare Island Navy Yard 14 October 1897 and decommissioned there 18 December.

Philadelphia recommissioned 9 July 1898 and became the flagship of Rear Admiral J. N. Miller, Commander-in-Chief of the Pacific Station. She steamed from San Francisco 2 July to participate in the ceremonies attending the assumption of sovereignty by the United States over the Hawaiian Islands. Flagship Philadelphia arrived Honolulu 3 August, and nine days hence her officers and those of the steam sloop Mohican, with a force under arms from the two warships, represented the US Navy at the ceremonies transferring the Hawaiian Islands to the United States.

In March 1899, with Commander-in-Chief Rear Admiral Albert Kautz embarked, Philadelphia steamed to the Samoan Islands for duty in connection with the settlement of civil difficulties by the Samoan Commissioners of the United States, Great Britain, and Germany. A landing party from Philadelphia went ashore in the vicinity of Vailele 1 April to act in concert with a British landing party. The combined force, ambushed by adherents of Chief Mataafa, sustained seven killed and seven wounded, including two American officers, Lieutenant Philip Lansdale and Ensign John R. Monaghan, and two sailors killed, including Seaman Norman Edsall, and five bluejackets wounded. Philadelphia remained in the Samoan Islands until 21 May 1899, when she steamed for the west coast via Honolulu.

Philadelphia served as flagship of the Pacific Station until 6 February 1900, when Rear Admiral Kautz transferred his flag to Iowa (BB-4). The cruiser continued Pacific operations until 1902, conducting training cruises, drills, target practice, and port visits.

Returning from a six-month cruise off the Panamanian coast, Philadelphia arrived San Francisco 17 July 1902. Needing extensive repairs, she was ordered to the Puget Sound Navy Yard for decommissioning. Arriving Bremerton, Washington 23 August, she decommissioned at Puget Sound 22 September 1902.

=== Receiving ship, 1904–1926 ===
Philadelphia was housed over and became a receiving ship at Puget Sound Navy Yard 12 May 1904. She continued this service until 4 November 1912, when she became a prison ship. Resuming service as a receiving ship 10 January 1916, she was redesignated with the hull number IX-24 (unclassified miscellaneous) on 17 July 1920. She was struck from the Navy List on 24 November 1926.

Cruiser Philadelphia was sold at public auction at the Puget Sound Navy Yard in 1927 to Louis Rotherberg.

== Bibliography ==
- Bauer, K. Jack; Roberts, Stephen S. (1991). Register of Ships of the U.S. Navy, 1775–1990: Major Combatants. Westport, Connecticut: Greenwood Press. ISBN 0-313-26202-0.
- Buenzle, Fred J. (1986). Bluejacket: An Autobiography. Annapolis: Naval Institute Press. ISBN 0-870-21190-0.
- Burr, Lawrence. US Cruisers 1883–1904: The Birth of the Steel Navy. Oxford : Osprey, 2008. ISBN 1-84603-267-9 OCLC 488657946
- Friedman, Norman (1984). U.S. Cruisers: An Illustrated Design History. Annapolis, Maryland: Naval Institute Press. ISBN 0-87021-718-6.
- Gardiner, Robert; Chesneau, Roger (1979). Conway's All the World's Fighting Ships 1860–1905. New York: Mayflower Books. ISBN 0-8317-0302-4.
- The White Squadron. Toledo, Ohio: Woolson Spice Co., 1891. OCLC 45112425
- United States. Hand Book of the U.S.S. Philadelphia. [Place of publication not identified]: U.S.S. Philadelphia, 1892. OCLC 44574766
- Wright, C. C. (2004). "Question 55/02: USS Philadelphia (C-4)". Warship International. XLI (1): 18–19. ISSN 0043-0374.
- Wright, C. C. (2004). "Question 55/02: USS Philadelphia (C-4)". Warship International. XLI (2): 115–121. ISSN 0043-0374.
- Wright, C. C. (2003). "Question 55/02: USS Philadelphia (C-4)". Warship International. XL (4): 300–301. ISSN 0043-0374.
