= USS Edsall (DE-129) =

US Navy WWII destroyer escort

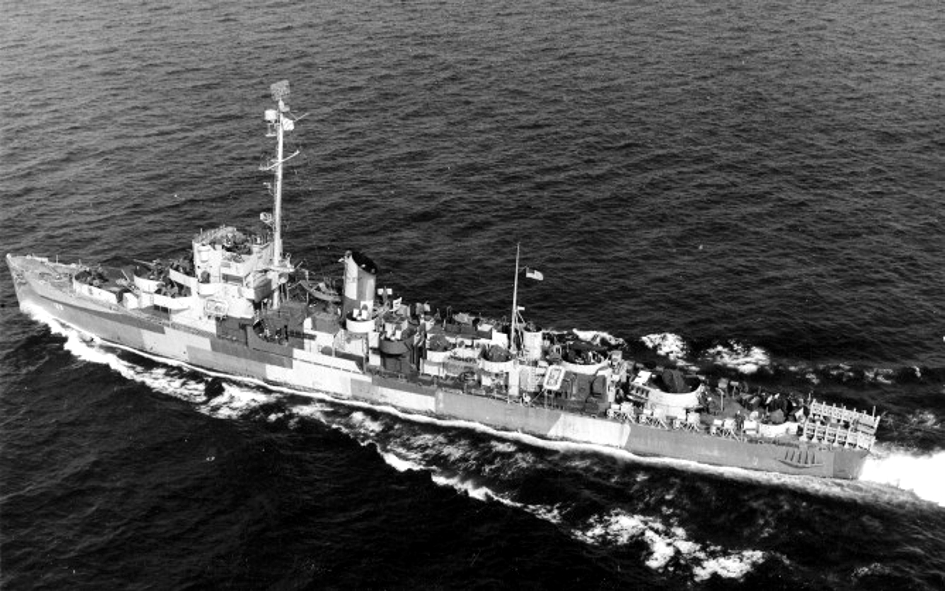
- USS Edsall (DE-129), overhead underway, after 1945 refit, before transfer to Pacific.

History

United States
- Namesake: Norman Edsall
- Builder: Consolidated Steel Corporation, Orange, Texas
- Laid down: 2 July 1942
- Launched: 1 November 1942
- Commissioned: 10 April 1943
- Decommissioned: 11 June 1946
- Stricken: 1 June 1968
- Fate: Sold for scrap, July 1969

General characteristics
- Class & type: Edsall-class destroyer escort
- Displacement: 1,590 tons full, 1,200 tons standard
- Length: 306 ft (93 m) overall
- Beam: 36 ft 7 in (11.15 m)
- Draught: 12 ft 3 in (3.73 m) ax
- Propulsion: 4 FM diesel engines, 4 diesel-generators, 6,000 shp (4.5 MW), 2 screws
- Speed: 21 knots (39 km/h)
- Range: 9,100 nmi. at 12 knots; (17,000 km at 22 km/h)
- Complement: 8 officers, 201 enlisted
- Armament: 3 × single 3 in (76 mm)/50 guns; 1 × twin 40 mm AA guns; 8 × single 20 mm AA guns; 1 × triple 21 in (533 mm) torpedo tubes; 8 × depth charge projectors; 1 × depth charge projector (hedgehog); 2 × depth charge tracks

USS Edsall (DE-129) was the lead ship of her class of destroyer escorts in the United States Navy. She was the second Navy ship named in honor of Seaman Norman Edsall (1873–1899).

Edsall was laid down by the Consolidated Steel Corporation at Orange, Texas, on 2 July 1942, launched 1 November 1942, sponsored by Mrs. Bessie Edsall Bracey, sister of Seaman Edsall, and commissioned on 10 April 1943.

== History ==
Edsall was a school ship at Norfolk, 20 June to 6 August 1943, for precommissioning crews of escort vessels, then served at Miami with the Submarine Chaser Training Center. In March 1944, she joined a tanker convoy at Galveston, Texas, assigned to Escort Division 59, whose flagship she became on 24 March. Edsall continued escort duty from the Gulf of Mexico to New York City and Norfolk, and with one convoy to NS Argentia, Newfoundland. In May, she sailed to Bermuda for antisubmarine warfare tests using a captured Italian submarine.

Between 1 July 1944 and 3 June 1945, she ranged Atlantic sealanes guarding seven convoys carrying materiel to the Mediterranean and Britain. While escorting the sixth convoy en route to New York from Liverpool on 10 April 1945, Edsall, along with other escorts, were quick to come to the assistance of two tankers in the convoy that had collided. Edsall searched for survivors and helped extinguish the fires that broke out.

Edsall sailed for the Pacific on 24 June 1945, but World War II ended while she was training at Pearl Harbor, and she returned east. She was placed out of commission in reserve at Green Cove Springs, Florida, on 11 June 1946.

Edsall was stricken from the Naval Vessel Register on 1 June 1968 and sold for scrap in July 1969.
