= USS Edsall (DD-219) =

Clemson-class destroyer

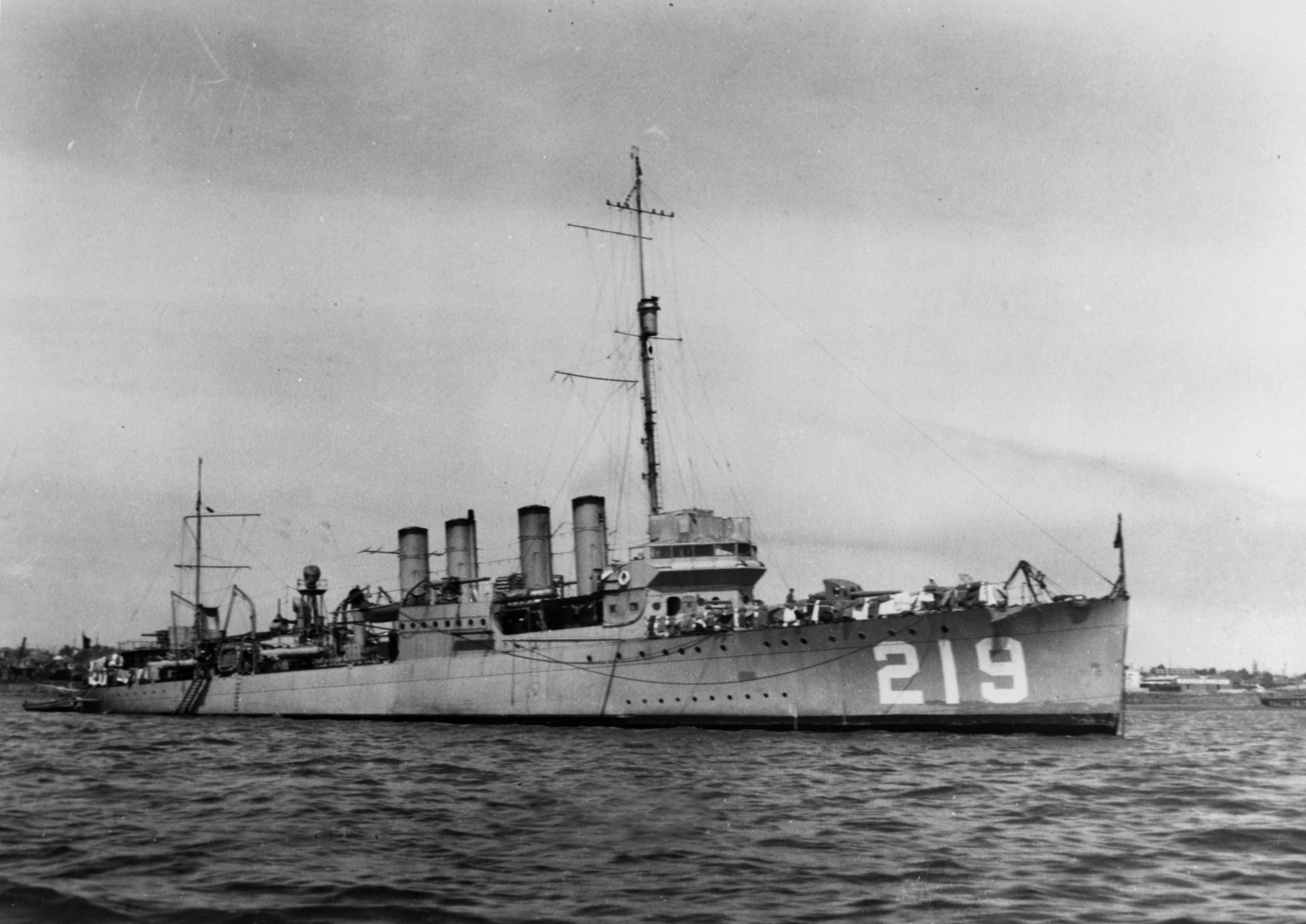
- Edsall in San Diego Harbor in the 1920s

History

United States
- Name: Edsall
- Namesake: Norman Eckley Edsall of Kentucky
- Builder: William Cramp & Sons, Philadelphia
- Yard number: 485
- Laid down: 15 September 1919
- Launched: 29 July 1920
- Commissioned: 26 November 1920
- Honours and awards: 2 battle stars
- Fate: Sunk by Japanese surface warships ~200 mi (320 km) SSE of Christmas Island, 1 March 1942

General characteristics
- Class & type: Clemson-class destroyer
- Displacement: 1,190 tons
- Length: 314 ft 5 in (95.83 m)
- Beam: 31 ft 9 in (9.68 m)
- Draft: 9 ft 3 in (2.82 m)
- Propulsion: 26,500 shp (19,800 kW); geared turbines, 2 screws
- Speed: 35 knots (65 km/h; 40 mph)
- Complement: 101 officers and enlisted; 153 in WWII
- Armament: 4 x 4 in (100 mm) guns; 1 x 3 in (76 mm) gun; 12 x 21-inch (533 mm) torpedo tubes with MK 8-IIIB torpedoes; Depth charges; .30 cal & .50 cal machine guns; several BARs [Browning Automatic Rifle] .30 cal

USS Edsall (DD-219), was a Clemson-class destroyer, the first of two United States Navy ships named after Seaman Norman Eckley Edsall (1873–1899). She was sunk by a combined Japanese air and sea attack, approximately 200 miles (320 km) SSE of Christmas Island on 1 March 1942.

== Construction and commissioning ==
Edsall was laid down by the William Cramp & Sons Ship and Engine Building Company on 15 September 1919, launched on 29 July 1920 by Mrs Bessie Edsall Bracey, sister of Seaman Edsall, and commissioned on 26 November 1920.

== Service history ==
Edsall sailed from Philadelphia on 6 December 1920 for San Diego, California for shakedown. She arrived at San Diego 11 January 1921, and remained on the United States West Coast until December, engaging in battle practice and gunnery drills with fleet units. Returning to Charleston, South Carolina, 28 December, Edsall departed 26 May 1922 for the Mediterranean.

Arriving at Constantinople on 28 June, Edsall joined the U.S. Naval Detachment in Turkish Waters to protect American interests as the Near East was in turmoil with civil strife in Russia, and Greece at war with Turkey.

She was part of the international effort to alleviate the postwar famine in eastern Europe. She helped evacuate refugees, furnishing a center of communications for the Near East and standing by for emergencies. When the Turks expelled the Anatolian Greeks from Smyrna (Izmir), Edsall was one of the American destroyers which evacuated refugees. On 14 September 1922, she took 607 refugees (Note: DD-219's log states 662 persons were evacuated.) off Litchfield in Smyrna and transported them to Salonika, returning to Smyrna on 16 September to act as flagship for the naval forces there. In October she carried refugees from Smyrna to Mytilene on Lesbos Island. She made repeated visits to ports in Turkey, Bulgaria, Russia, Greece, Egypt, Mandate Palestine, the Syrian Federation, Tunisia, Dalmatia, and Italy, and kept up gunnery and torpedo practice with her sisters until her return to Boston, Massachusetts, for an overhaul on 26 July 1924.

Edsall sailed to join the U.S. Asiatic Fleet on 3 January 1925, joining in battle practice and maneuvers at Guantanamo Bay, San Diego, and Pearl Harbor before arriving at Shanghai on 22 June. She was to become a fixture of the Asiatic Fleet on the China coast, in the Philippines and Japan. Her primary duty was protection of American interests in the Far East. She served during the civil war in China, and the early part of the Sino-Japanese War. Battle practice, maneuvers and diplomacy took her most frequently to Shanghai, Yantai, Hankou, Hong Kong, Nanjing, Kobe, Bangkok, and Manila. In late October 1927, Edsall visited the Siamese capital Bangkok, and had three of the Royal Princesses aboard for tea. In return Edsall's skipper, Commander Jules James, was given an engraved silver cigarette case by the Thai Royal Family.

=== World War II ===
On 25 November 1941, two days in advance of the "war warning" which predicted that hostile Japanese action in the Pacific was imminent, Admiral Hart, commander of the Asiatic Fleet, dispatched Destroyer Division (DesDiv) 57 (USS Whipple, USS Alden, USS John D. Edwards and Edsall) with the destroyer tender USS Black Hawk, to Balikpapan, Borneo, to disperse the surface ships of his fleet from their vulnerable position in Manila Bay.

At the time of the Japanese attack on Pearl Harbor on 8 December 1941, Edsall was en route to Batavia (now Jakarta) with her sister ships and Black Hawk. When word was received DesDiv 57 was then ordered to Singapore to rendezvous with Royal Navy Force Z. She delivered a badly-needed secret ECM coding machine and embarked a British liaison officer and four men at Singapore from HMS Mauritius and was sent to search for survivors of HMS Prince of Wales and HMS Repulse, sunk by Japanese aircraft off the east coast of Malaya on 10 December. Although she did not rescue survivors, DD-219 and the other fourpipers of DesDiv 57 did come across wreckage and oil in the waters near the sinking location. As she returned Edsall intercepted a Japanese fishing trawler, Kofuku Maru (later renamed MV Krait and used extensively by Australian special forces) with four small boats in tow and escorted them into Singapore before turning them over to HMAS Goulburn.

Edsall and her division joined the heavy cruiser USS Houston and other US units at Surabaya on 16 December 1941 and escorted shipping retiring to the relative safety of Darwin, Australia. During the first week of 1942 Edsall escorted elements of the Pensacola Convoy from Torres Strait back to Darwin.

After fueling operations in the Lesser Sunda Islands, Edsall and Alden were escorting the Darwin-bound oiler USS Trinity in the Beagle Gulf 40 nautical miles (74 km; 46 mi) west of Darwin. On the morning of 20 January 1942 the Imperial Japanese Navy submarine I-123 sighted Trinity, and misidentifed her as a transport. I-123 fired four Type 89 torpedoes at 12°05′30″S 130°05′36″E shortly after 0630. The sound man aboard I-123 reported hearing one torpedo hit, but all four torpedoes had missed; Trinity had sighted three of them and reported the attack. Alden then searched for I-123, made a sound contact and conducted a brief depth charge attack at 06:41 before losing contact and abandoning the search.

Later that day, Edsall and three Australian corvettes, HMAS Deloraine, HMAS Lithgow, and HMAS Katoomba, working in concert sank I-124 off Darwin, the first sinking of a full-sized submarine with the involvement of a U.S. destroyer in World War II.

Continuing to escort convoys in northern Australian waters, Edsall was damaged when one of her own depth charges exploded during an anti-submarine attack on 23 January 1942 in the shallow—8-fathom (48 ft; 15 m)—Howard Channel. Although her skipper (LT J. J. Nix, USNA 1930) denied that her readiness for war was affected, the destroyer did have a leaking stern and shaft vibration afterwards that limited her top speed to approx. 27-28 knots.

On 3 February, Edsall and other American units of the American-British-Dutch-Australian Command, at that time commanding Allied forces in the area, moved up to Tjilatjap, Java in order to be closer to the combat theater and to replenish. She continued as a patrol vessel off southern Java. On 23 February 1942 she and the old gunboat USS Asheville operated off Tjilatjap on antisubmarine patrols. At this time Asheville was also escorting small convoys in Sunda Strait.

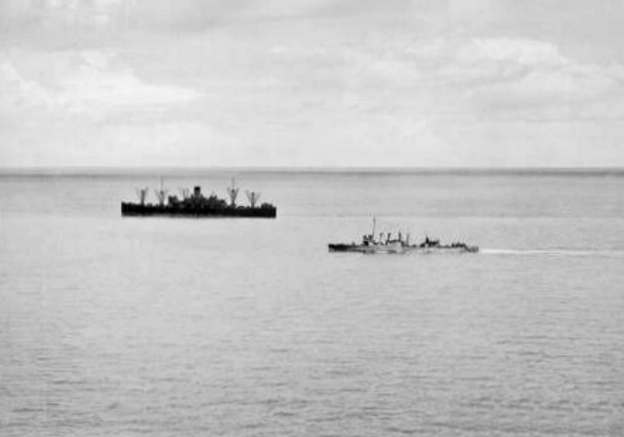
Edsall and USAT Willard A. Holbrook sometime in early 1942.

On the afternoon of 26 February, she steamed from Tjilatjap with her sister ship USS Whipple to rendezvous with the converted seaplane tender USS Langley, which was bringing in P-40E fighters and U.S. Army Air Forces (USAAF) personnel for the defense of Java. On the following day, 27 February, the three ships were attacked by sixteen Mitsubishi G4M "Betty" bombers of the Imperial Japanese Navy Air Service's Takao Kōkūtai, led by Lieutenant Jiro Adachi, flying out of Den Pasar airfield on Bali, escorted by fifteen Mitsubishi A6M2 Reisen (Zero) fighters. The attack damaged Langley so severely that she had to be abandoned after scuttling attempts by torpedoes and gunfire from Whipple failed to sink her. Exhibiting fine shiphandling, Edsall had picked up 177 survivors, and Whipple 308. There were a number of wounded men on the destroyers—some requiring hospitalization—and it was hoped the destroyers would be sent to Australia, but these requests were denied by Vice Admiral William A. Glassford, the COMSOWESPAC; that is, the commander of U.S. naval forces in the southwest Pacific. Instead they were ordered to meet the oiler USS Pecos (AO-6) at Christmas Island, about 200 miles south of Java and transfer the Langley survivors to that ship.

On 28 February, the two destroyers rendezvoused with the oiler USS Pecos off Flying Fish Cove, Christmas Island some 250 miles (400 km) southwest of Tjilatjap. A flight of Japanese medium attack bombers (Rikko) from Bali came over just as these transfers of men were about to begin; this forced Edsall and other ships to head for a nearby rain squall, and then open sea. They headed south into the Indian Ocean for the rest of 28 February and all night in high winds and heavy seas. This delayed the transfer of men to Pecos. Finally, between 0430 (USN/local time) and 0815 on 1 March all Langley's crew—except for the AAF men—were transferred safely to the oiler thanks to the superb boathandling of Boatswain Robert Baumker of Pecos. Whipple then set off for Cocos as protection for the tanker Belita. Pecos, carrying as many as 700 crew and survivors from Langley, Stewart, Marblehead and Houston, plus assorted stragglers, was ordered to Australia.

Edsall was directed to return to Tjilatjap, carrying 31 uninjured USAAF pilots and 10 or 11 ground crew who had been passengers on Langley. (Two wounded AAF fliers, Dix and Akerman, were evacuated on Pecos.) The USAAF personnel were to assemble and fly 27 disassembled and crated P-40 fighters which had been delivered to Tjilatjap aboard the cargo ship Sea Witch. Following orders from Glassford, at 0830 she headed back to the northeast for Java.

=== Last engagement of Edsall ===
Pecos was detected later that morning by air patrols from the Support Force cruisers of Japanese Vice Admiral Chūichi Nagumo's Kido Butai (or KdB). Soon she came under heavy air attack from Nagumo's carriers. For some time she sent out open distress calls to any Allied ships in the area, as it was assumed the Japanese obviously knew her location already and the ship would probably be lost. Whipple, less than 100 miles (160 km) distant, received some of these calls, but was too far away to return quickly and wanted to arrive after dark in any case. USS Mount Vernon, a troopship many hundreds of miles south in the Indian Ocean also copied some of these signals. At approximately 1548 hours Pecos sank after being attacked for several hours by four waves of IJN dive-bombers from Nagumo's KdB. IJN records indicate the distance between the Japanese force and Pecos could then have been as little as twenty miles. Nagumo gave orders to RADM Omori of 1st Torpedo Squadron (DesRon 1) to send two destroyers to rescue survivors of Pecos and then sink the oiler if it was still afloat. Omori sent the destroyers Tanikaze and Urakaze of the 17th Division, but they never found the men in the water and returned to Nagumo KdB as dusk fell.

Meanwhile, almost simultaneously, at 1550 hours (USN/local time) the Japanese task force spotted what they thought was a single "light cruiser" about 16 miles (26 km) behind the force, approximately 250 miles (400 km) south southeast of Christmas Island; this was in fact Edsall. Due to her four funnels she was mistaken for a Marblehead-type light cruiser. The destroyer was perhaps no more than 38–54 kilometres (24–34 mi) from the last reported position of Pecos and probably attempting to get to her stricken comrades. At about 1603 hours she was seen from the Japanese heavy cruiser Chikuma, steaming straight as an arrow and "trailing black smoke". Within five minutes the cruiser opened fire with her 8-inch (203 mm) guns. Fifteen minutes later the battleships of Vice Admiral Gunichi Mikawa's Sentai 3/1 (Hiei and Kirishima) opened fire with their main battery of 14-inch (356 mm) guns at extreme range (30,000 yards, 27,000 m). All shells missed as the destroyer conducted evasive maneuvers that ranged from flank speed, about 26 knots (48 km/h; 30 mph), to full stop, with radical turns "about every minute" and intermittent smoke-screens. The Japanese attackers later wrote that Edsall appeared to alter course whenever she saw the flash of their guns.Edsall also disrupted the Japanese by counter-attacking from time to time with her torpedoes and 4-inch battery. She signalled that she had been surprised by two enemy battleships; this was copied by the Dutch merchant ship Siantar more than 99 miles (160 km) away. The skill shown by Edsall in dodging extensive shelling during this engagement led to a veteran of Chikuma to later write that she "ran away like a Japanese dancing mouse". Another IJN veteran--a divebomber pilot from Hiryu--wrote that the frantic destroyer resembled a little brat being chased by four adults who were having a hard time of it.

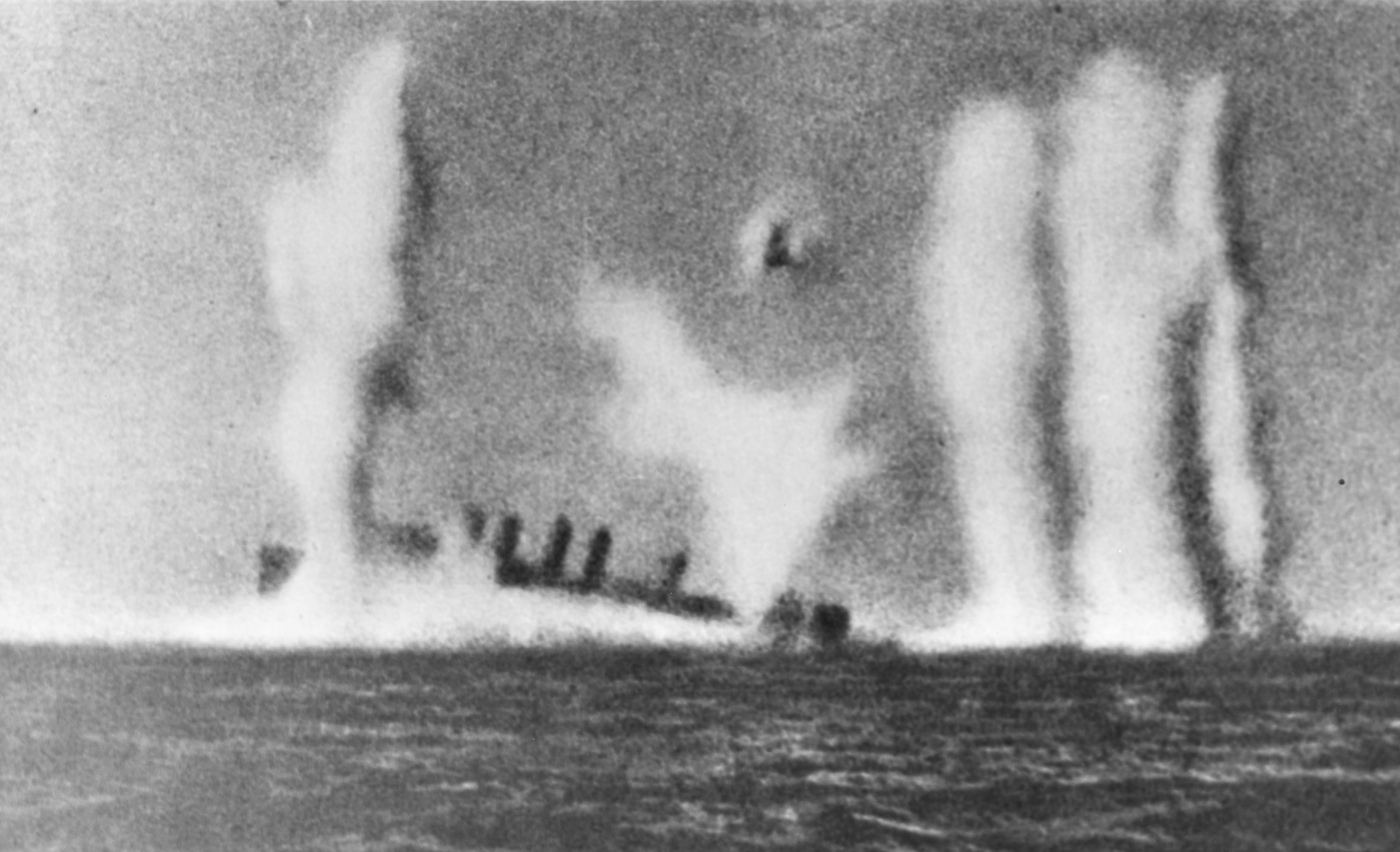
USS Edsall sinking; retouched IJN propaganda image.

The Japanese surface vessels (two cruisers, two battleships) fired 1,335 shells at Edsall that afternoon, with no more than one or two hits, which failed to stop the destroyer. Vice Admiral Nagumo ordered airstrikes: 26 Type 99 dive bombers (Aichi D3A) (kanbaku) in three groups (chutai) took off from the carriers Kaga (eight bombers), Hiryū (nine), and Sōryū (nine). The dive bombers were led by Lieutenants Ogawa, Kobayashi, and Koite respectively. Although the divebombers of Hiryu were distracted by a false submarine sighting and did not drop all of their bombs on DD-219, the bombs that were dropped eventually immobilised Edsall.

At 17:22 the Japanese ships resumed firing on the destroyer. A Japanese cameraman, probably on the cruiser Tone, filmed about 90 seconds of her destruction. (A single frame from this film was culled for use as a propaganda photo later in multiple publications, misidentified both as "the British destroyer HMS Pope" and "the American destroyer John Paul Jones". The footage is said to be the only film of an American warship being sunk at sea by gunfire. The connection between the single image used in IJN propaganda pamphlets and the film footage was not established until over 55 years later.) Finally, at 17:31 hrs (19:01 IJN/Tokyo time) Edsall rolled onto her side, "showing her red bottom" according to an officer aboard the Hiei, and sank amid clouds of steam and smoke in 18,000 feet (5,500 m) of water some 200 miles (320 km) east of Christmas Island. The Japanese report after action described the sinking of Edsall as a fiasco. The Imperial Japanese Navy revised rules of engagement for battleships and cruisers against destroyers.

Edsall received two battle stars for her World War II service.

== Later developments ==
=== The fate of Edsall's survivors ===
Japanese Imperial Navy officers aboard the cruiser Chikuma several years later reported that a number of men may have survived the sinking of Edsall as they were found in the water on liferafts, cutters or clinging to debris. However, due to a submarine alert, the Japanese only stopped long enough to rescue eight sailors before they received orders to retire, leaving the others to perish in the Indian Ocean. Due to the chaotic situation in Java as the Japanese war machine enveloped the island and thousands of allied personnel as well as civilians were attempting to escape, the exact number of men on board Edsall at the time of her sinking has never been established with great precision. There were probably upwards of 200 men on the ship on 1 March 1942, though. This figure is arrived at by adding together her known crew of 153 plus 41 or 42 AAF personnel (from Langley), and at least two others from USS Stewart (DD-224) who went to the ship at Tjilatjap sometime after 22 February.

Onboard Chikuma, the eight survivors were interrogated by their captors; the name of their ship was recorded as "the old destroyer E-do-soo-ru" (エドソール in katakana) and as EDSALL in English. After a few days, the details of these interrogations were provided to the other ships of Nagumo's Kido Butai during their return journey. The Americans were held on Chikuma for the next ten days before returning to the Japanese force's advance base at Staring Bay near Kendari, Celebes,on 11 March 1942. There they were turned over to 23rd Special Base Force troops (formerly Sasebo Combined Special Naval Landing Force, or Kaigun Tokubetsu Rikusentai) under the command of RADM Mori Kunizo.

=== Mass grave ===
On 21 September 1946, a group of mass graves was opened near the big Kendari II airfield, used by the Japanese since January 1942. It was a remote locale in Celebes, East Indies, over 1,000 miles (1,600 km) from where Edsall had disappeared. Two of the grave-pits contained 34 decapitated bodies, among which were the remains of six Edsall crewmen and what were thought to be perhaps five USAAF personnel from Langley, along with over two dozen Javanese, Chinese, and Dutch merchant sailors from the Dutch merchant-ship Modjokerto. (That ship was sunk on the same day as Edsall by Nagumo's Support Force destroyers and Chikuma.) The American bodies were reinterred in the US Military Cemetery at Barrackpore, India on 12 November, 1946. Later, the remains were reburied at U.S. cemeteries (at the Punch Bowl in Honolulu and Jefferson Barracks Nat'l. Cemetery at St. Louis) between December 1949 and March 1950. War crimes trials conducted in 1946–1948 concerning other murders that occurred in or near Kendari by IJN personnel recorded fragmentary information about the killings of Edsall survivors, but were not recognized as such by Allied investigators, and were not pursued. RADM Mori Kunizo--later VADM Mori--was a participant in the grotesque cannibalism cases involving American fliers captured on Chichijima later in the war, and was convicted by the U.S. in 1948, but not sentenced to death. However, while imprisoned he was turned over to Dutch war crimes prosecutors for earlier atrocities in the East Indies (not related to Edsall) and executed, being hanged by the Dutch on April 22, 1949.

=== L. Ron Hubbard claim ===
L. Ron Hubbard claimed that he had served on Edsall during World War II and that, following her sinking, he swam to shore and remained in the jungle as the ship's sole survivor. He claimed that this is where he was during the bombing of Pearl Harbor, although Edsall had been sunk in 1942, and the U.S. Navy has no record of his service on the ship. Navy records show that Hubbard was in training in New York when the war broke out. He was supposed to be posted to the Philippines, but his ship was diverted to Australia. There he angered the US naval attaché for assuming "unauthorized duties"; he was relieved from his assignment and returned to the United States.

=== Wreck discovery ===
The wreck of Edsall was located in mid-2023 roughly 200 miles SSE of Christmas Island at a depth of 18,000 feet. The ship sits upright and is largely intact; some of Edsall's guns still point in the direction of her attackers. It was discovered by the Royal Australian Navy's MV Stoker during an undisclosed, unrelated mission in the region. The announcement of the wreck was delayed until Veterans Day in the United States, concurrently with Remembrance Day in the UK and Australia, in 2024.

== Sources ==
- Kehn, Jr., Donald M. (2008). A Blue Sea of Blood : Deciphering the Mysterious Fate of the USS Edsall. Minneapolis: Zenith Press. ISBN 978-1-61673-238-7. OCLC 842262488.
- Kehn, Jr., Donald M. In the Highest Degree Tragic: the Sacrifice of the US Asiatic Fleet in the East Indies during World War II. (Potomac Books, 2017.)
- Messimer, Dwight R. Pawns of War: The Loss of the USS Langley and the USS Pecos (USNI Press, 1983).
