= USS Lansdale (DD-766) =

History

United States
- Name: USS Lansdale
- Namesake: Philip Lansdale (1858-1899), a United States Navy officer
- Laid down: 2 April 1944
- Launched: 20 December 1946
- Sponsored by: Mrs. Ethel S. Lansdale
- Completed: Never
- Commissioned: Never
- Stricken: 9 June 1958
- Fate: Never saw active service

General characteristics
- Class & type: Gearing-class destroyer
- Displacement: 2,425 tons
- Length: 390 ft 6 in (119.0 m) (overall)
- Beam: 41 ft 1 in (12.52 m)
- Draft: 18 ft 6 in (5.64 m)
- Propulsion: 2 × geared turbines; 2 × propellers
- Speed: 35 kn (65 km/h; 40 mph)
- Range: 4,500 nmi (8,300 km; 5,200 mi) at 20 kn (37 km/h; 23 mph)
- Complement: 336 officers and enlisted
- Armament: 6 × 5 in (127 mm)/38 caliber guns; 12 × 40 mm (1.6 in) Bofors AA guns; 11 × 20 mm (0.79 in) Oerlikon AA cannons; 10 × 21 in (533 mm) torpedo tubes; 6 × depth charge projectors; 2 × depth charge tracks

USS Lansdale (DD-766) was scheduled to be a Gearing-class destroyer in the United States Navy. She was named for Philip Lansdale (1858-1899), a United States Navy officer.

Lansdale was laid down 2 April 1944 by Bethlehem Steel Company, San Francisco, California; launched 20 December 1946; sponsored by Mrs. Ethel S. Lansdale; and delivered 30 December in partially completed status to the 12th Naval District for berthing at Suisun Bay.

Lansdale saw no active service. In May 1956 she was towed to Long Beach Naval Shipyard where her bow was removed to replace the damaged bow of USS Floyd B. Parks (DD-884). Her name was struck from the Naval Vessel Register 9 June 1958.
