= USS Lansdale (DD-101) =

Wickes-class destroyer

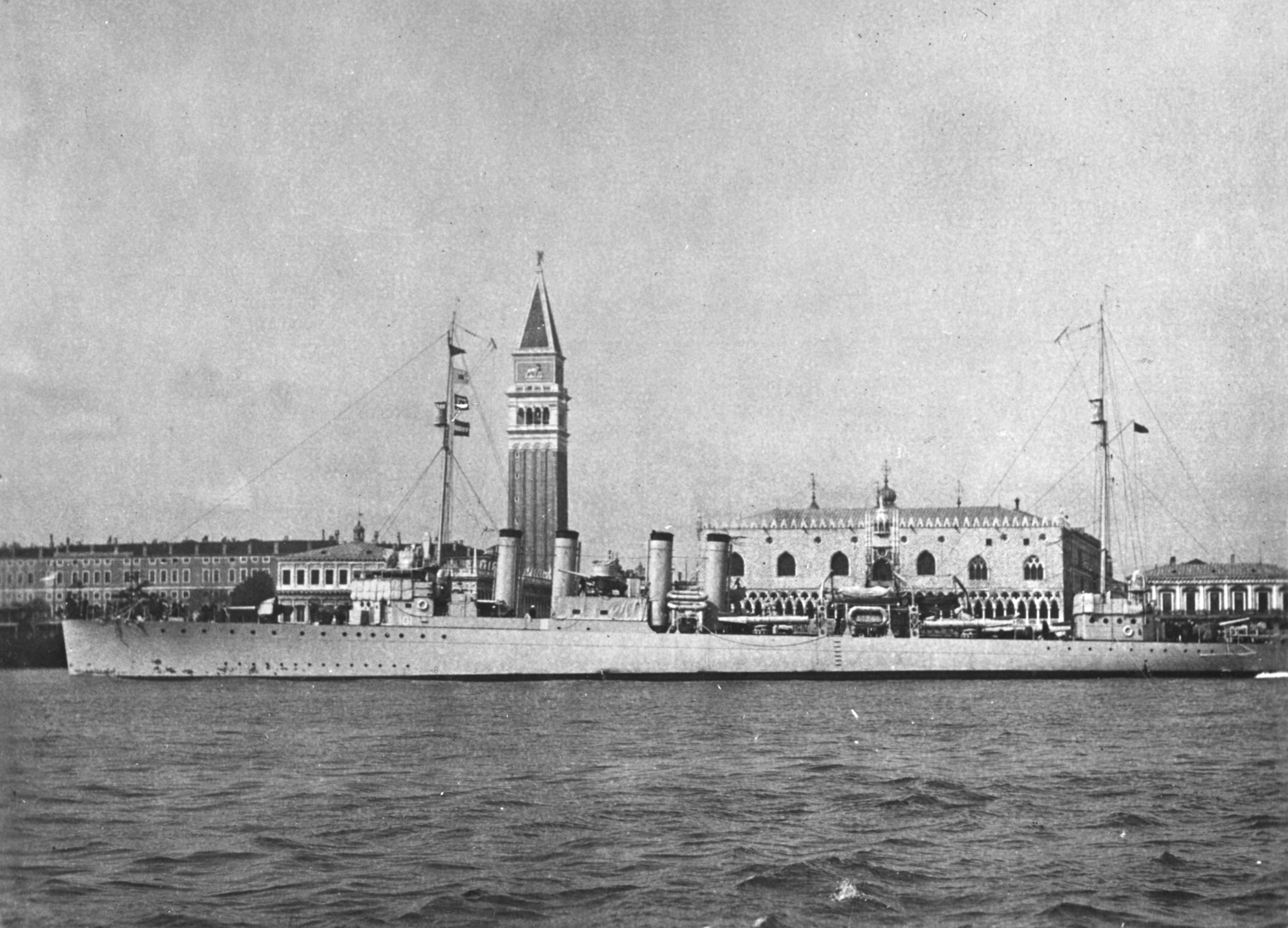
- USS Lansdale at Venice, Italy, in 1919.

History

United States
- Name: Lansdale
- Namesake: Philip Van Horne Lansdale
- Builder: Fore River Shipyard, Quincy, Massachusetts
- Laid down: 20 April 1918
- Launched: 21 July 1918
- Commissioned: 26 October 1918
- Reclassified: Light minelayer, DM-6, 11 July 1920
- Decommissioned: 25 June 1922
- Recommissioned: 1 May 1930
- Decommissioned: 24 March 1931
- Stricken: 25 January 1937
- Fate: Hulked 28 December 1936 Sold 16 March 1939

General characteristics
- Class & type: Wickes-class destroyer
- Displacement: 1,060 tons
- Length: 314 ft 5 in (95.8 m)
- Beam: 31 ft 9 in (9.7 m)
- Draft: 8 ft 6 in (2.6 m)
- Speed: 35 knots (65 km/h)
- Complement: 113 officers and enlisted
- Armament: 4 × 4 in (102 mm) guns; 2 × 1-pounder gun; 12 × 21 in (533 mm) torpedo tubes; 1 × depth charge projector

The first USS Lansdale (DD-101) was a Wickes-class destroyer in the United States Navy during World War I and later designated, DM-6 in the years following. She was named in honor of Philip Van Horne Lansdale.

== History ==
Lansdale was laid down on 20 April 1918 by Fore River Shipbuilding Corporation, Quincy, Massachusetts. The ship was launched on 21 July 1918, sponsored by Mrs. Ethel S. Lansdale, widow of Lieutenant Lansdale. The destroyer was commissioned on 26 October 1918 at Boston.

Assigned to the Cruiser and Transport Force, Lansdale steamed to Norfolk from 4 November to 7 November and joined a European bound convoy as escort on 12 November. Sailing via the Azores, she reached Gibraltar on 26 November for patrol duty in the Mediterranean Sea. Operating out of Gibraltar until January 1919, she made three voyages to Tangier, Morocco, and one to Algiers, Algeria. Steaming to Venice from 4 January to 13 January, she joined the U.S. Naval Force operating the eastern Mediterranean. She performed dispatch duty in the Adriatic Sea, principally between Venice and the ports of Austria (on the Croatian coast). On 1 April 1919, she was in Spalato, now Split, with Olympia and Israel. Departing Split, Croatia (then Kingdom of Serbs, Croats and Slovenes on 10 June, she steamed to Gibraltar and the Azores and reached New York on 22 June.

During the next year Lansdale operated along the Atlantic coast with Destroyer Force, Atlantic Fleet. Arriving at Philadelphia on 11 July 1920, she was converted to a light minelayer and reclassified DM-6. She steamed to Newport, Rhode Island from 2 June to 3 June 1921; joined the Mine Force, Atlantic Fleet on 5 July at Gloucester, Massachusetts; and until late October practiced laying mines off the New England and Virginia coasts under the command of Lt. Cmdr. Laurance T. DuBose. After overhaul at Boston, she steamed to Guantanamo Bay from 4 January to 9 January 1922 for maneuvers, mining exercises, and war games in the West Indies with Mine Squadron 1. Departing Culebra Island on 19 April, she arrived at Philadelphia on 25 April and decommissioned on 25 June.

Lansdale recommissioned on 1 May 1930 at Philadelphia. She joined Mine Squadron 1 at Yorktown on 17 May; engaged in mining and tactical exercises along the eastern seaboard; then arrived at New London, Connecticut on 30 September to serve as target ship for submarines. She departed on 12 November; and, after visiting Boston, she arrived at Philadelphia on 22 December. Remaining there, Lansdale decommissioned on 24 March 1931. On 28 December 1936 she was reduced to a hulk for disposal in accordance with the London Treaty for limitation and reduction of naval armaments. Her name was struck from the Naval Register on 25 January 1937, and she was sold on 16 March 1939 to Union Shipbuilding Company, Baltimore, Maryland.
