= USS Olympia (C-6) =

United States Navy steam-powered cruiser

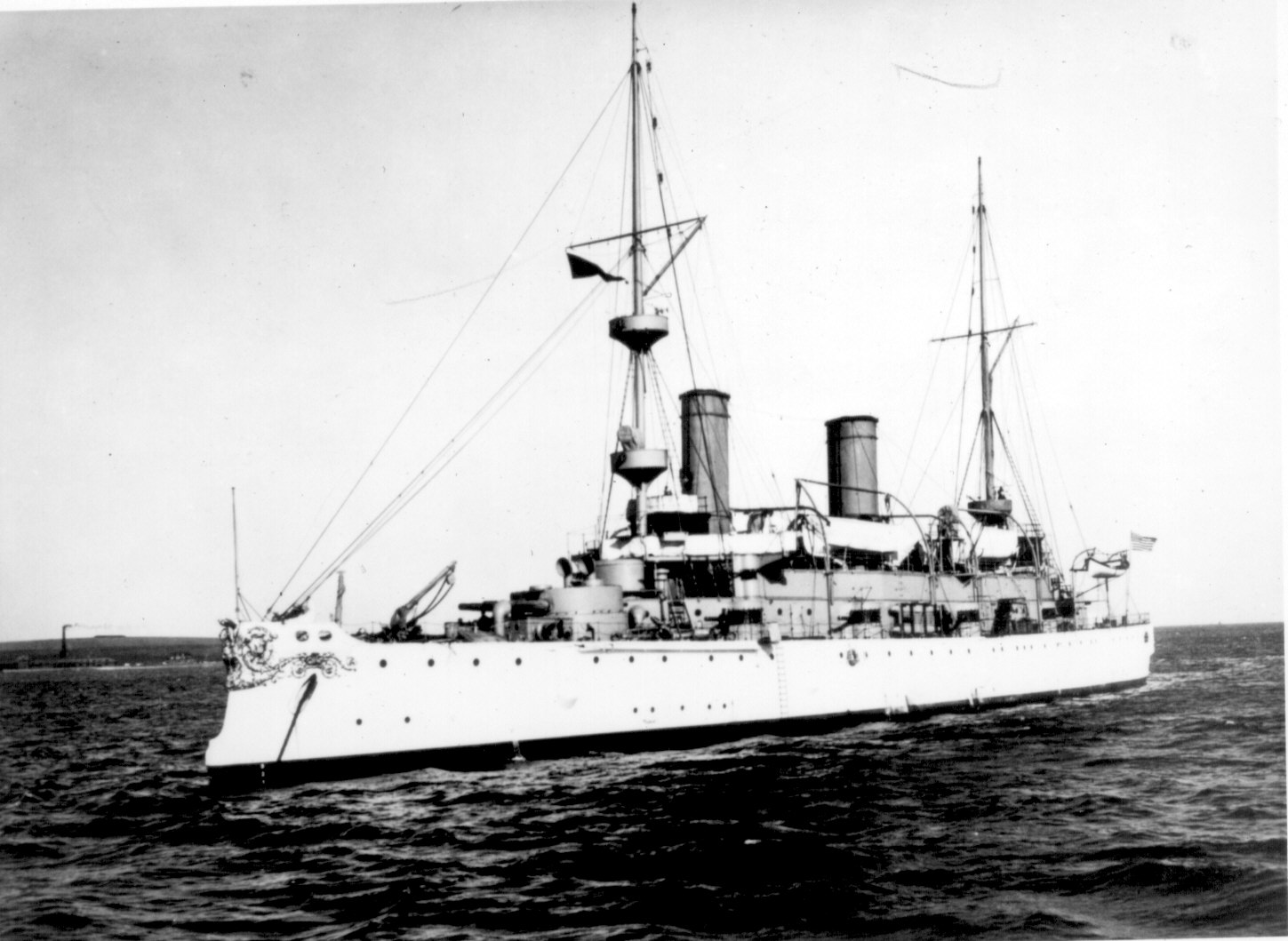
- USS Olympia (C-6), port bow, 10 February 1902

History

United States
- Name: Olympia
- Namesake: The City of Olympia, Washington
- Ordered: 7 September 1888
- Builder: Union Iron Works, San Francisco, California
- Laid down: 17 June 1891
- Launched: 5 November 1892
- Sponsored by: Miss Ann B. Dickie
- Commissioned: 5 February 1895
- Decommissioned: 9 November 1899
- Recommissioned: January 1902
- Decommissioned: 2 April 1906
- Recommissioned: 1916
- Decommissioned: 9 December 1922
- Reclassified: CA-15, 17 July 1920; CL-15, 8 August 1921; IX-40, 30 June 1931
- Refit: 1901, 1902, 1916
- Stricken: 11 September 1957
- Identification: Hull symbol: C-6; Hull symbol: CA-15; Hull symbol: CL-15; Hull symbol: IX-40
- Nickname(s): "Queen of the Pacific", "The Winged O"
- Fate: Restored as museum ship
- Status: Museum ship.

General characteristics (as built)
- Type: Protected cruiser
- Displacement: 5,586 long tons (5,676 t) (standard); 6,588 long tons (6,694 t) (full load)
- Length: 344 ft 1 in (104.88 m)
- Beam: 53 ft (16 m)
- Draft: 21 ft 6 in (6.55 m)
- Installed power: 17,000 ihp (13,000 kW)
- Propulsion: 2 × vertical triple-expansion steam engines; 6 × boilers (4 × double-ended, 2 × single-ended); 2 × screws
- Speed: 21.7 knots (40.2 km/h; 25.0 mph)
- Range: 6,000 nmi (11,000 km; 6,900 mi) at 10 knots (19 km/h; 12 mph)
- Capacity: 1,169 short tons (1,060 t) coal (maximum)
- Complement: 33 officers and 395 enlisted
- Armament: 4 × 8 in (203 mm)/35 cal Mark 4 guns (2×2); 10 × 5 in (127 mm)/40 cal Mark 2 guns (10×1); 14 × 6-pounder 57 mm (2.24 in) Driggs-Schroeder guns; 6 × 1-pounder 37 mm (1.46 in) guns; 4 × Gatling guns; 6 × 17.7 in (450 mm) above-surface torpedo tubes, firing Whitehead Mark 1 torpedoes
- Armor: Deck: 4.75 in (12.1 cm) on slopes; 2 in (5.1 cm) flat; 3 in (7.6 cm) ends; Barbettes: 4.5 in (11 cm); Turrets: 3.5 in (8.9 cm); 4 in (10 cm) (shields to 5-inch guns)

General characteristics (1917)
- Armament: 10 × 5 in (127 mm)/51 cal Mark 8 guns (10×1)
- Olympia
- U.S. National Register of Historic Places
- U.S. National Historic Landmark
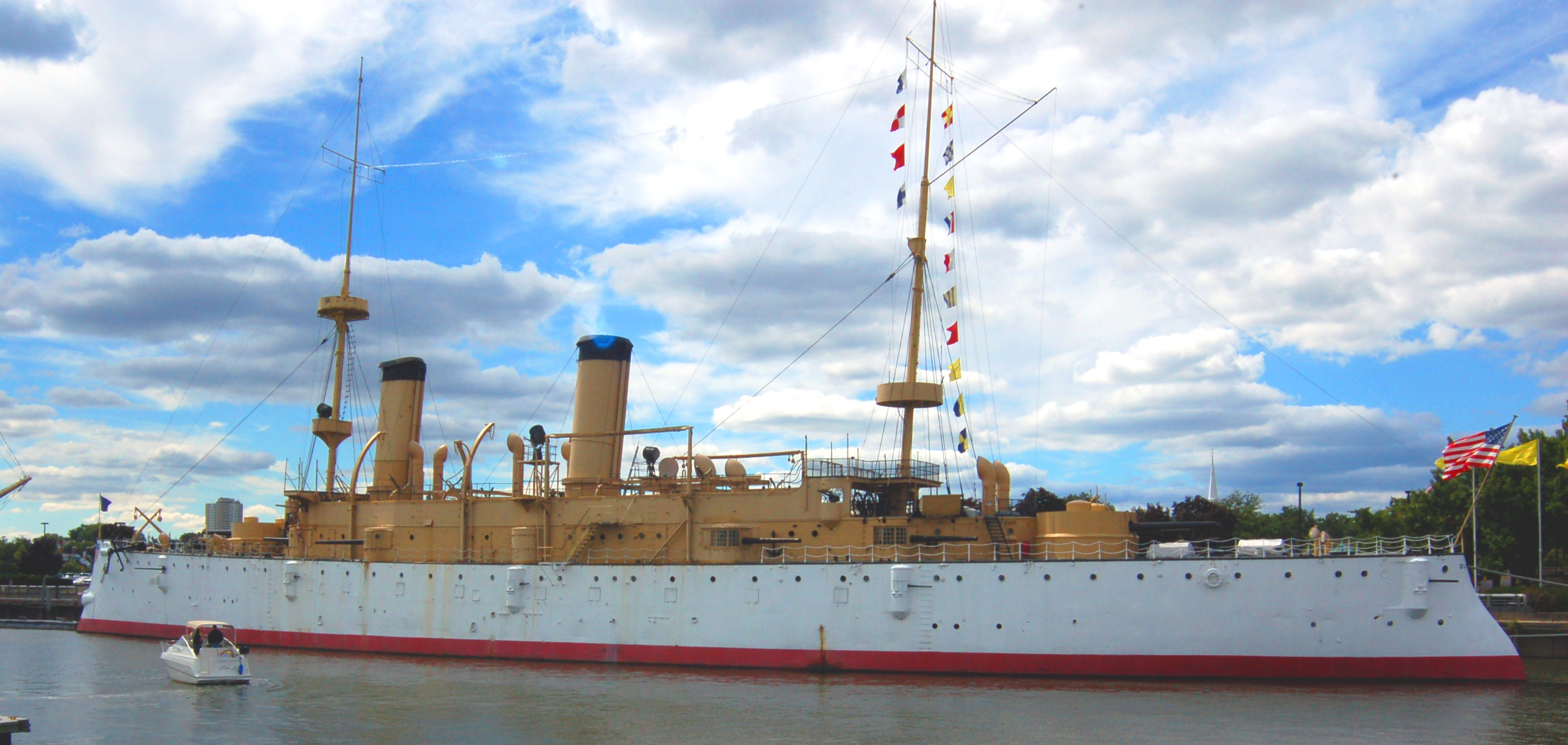
- USS Olympia (C-6) at the Independence Seaport Museum in 2007.

- Location within Pennsylvania
- Location: Penn's Landing Marina, South Columbus Blvd. Philadelphia, Pennsylvania, United States
- Coordinates: 39°56′37″N 75°08′28″W
- Area: Less than one acre
- Built: 1892
- Built by: Union Iron Works of San Francisco
- NRHP reference No.: 66000692
- Added to NRHP: 15 October 1966

USS Olympia (C-6/CA-15/CL-15/IX-40) is a protected cruiser that saw service with the United States Navy from her commissioning in 1895 until 1922. She is currently a museum ship in Philadelphia.

Olympia became famous as the flagship of Commodore George Dewey during the Battle of Manila Bay in the Spanish–American War in 1898. The ship was decommissioned after returning to the U.S. in 1899, but was returned to active service in 1902. She served until World War I as a training ship for naval cadets and as a barracks ship in Charleston, South Carolina. In 1917, she was mobilized again for war service, patrolling the American coast and escorting transport ships.

After World War I, Olympia participated in the 1919 Allied intervention in the Russian Civil War and conducted cruises in the Mediterranean and Adriatic Seas to promote peace in the unstable Balkan countries. In 1921, the ship carried the remains of World War I's Unknown Soldier from France to Washington, D.C., where his body was interred in Arlington National Cemetery. Olympia was decommissioned for the last time in December 1922 and placed in reserve.

In 1957, the U.S. Navy ceded title to the Cruiser Olympia Association, which restored the ship to her 1898 configuration. Since then, Olympia has been a museum ship in Philadelphia, where it is now part of the Independence Seaport Museum. Olympia was designated a National Historic Landmark in 1966.

Olympia is the oldest steel American warship still afloat. Repairs, estimated at $10 to 20 million, were desperately needed to keep Olympia afloat, and in 2010 the Independence Seaport Museum considered finding a new steward for the ship. By 2014, the museum reversed its plan to find a new steward and soon obtained funding from private donors as well as federal and state agencies to begin work on repairing the ship.

The museum invested in extensive stabilization measures including reinforcing the most deteriorated areas of the hull, expanding the alarm system, installing a network of bilge pumping stand pipes (which will provide greater damage control capability in the unlikely event of a hull breach), extensive deck patching and extensive repair and recoating of the ship's rigging. This work was made possible by donations from the National Trust for Historic Preservation, the U.S. Cruiser Sailors Association and many individual donors. By 2017, the museum completed the first phase of repairs to the ship and has embarked on an ambitious national campaign to raise the $20 million needed to dry-dock Olympia and address waterline deterioration of the hull.

== Background ==
When Grover Cleveland first took office in 1885, United States Secretary of the Navy William Collins Whitney continued the naval modernization program started during the preceding Arthur Administration. U.S. naval policy at the time was focused on commerce raiding, which implied a defensive posture on the part of the United States.

In 1887, Whitney authorized the construction of two coastal defense battleships, that were to become Texas and Maine. The emphasis was still on large and fast commerce-raiding cruisers, capable of destroying an attacking fleet's supply line. President Grover Cleveland was defeated in the election of 1888, but before he left office, Whitney managed to have Congress authorize two additional cruisers, one of which was the large, 5,300 long tons (5,385 t) protected cruiser that was to become Olympia.

Starting in 1887, the new Secretary of the Navy, Benjamin Tracy, began to rethink naval policy. Although Tracy allowed the design and construction of Olympia to continue, he was a follower of Alfred Thayer Mahan. As such, Tracy advocated a battle fleet capable of engaging enemy fleets in their home waters. This meant a shift away from large, fast, commerce-raiding cruisers. As a result, Olympia, which would probably have been the first in a class of ships, was the only one of her type built.

== Design and construction ==
The newly formed Board on the Design of Ships began the design process for Cruiser Number 6 in 1889. For main armament, the board chose 8 in (203 mm) guns, though the number and arrangement of these weapons, as well as the armor scheme, was heavily debated. On 8 April 1890, the navy solicited bids but found only one bidder, the Union Iron Works in San Francisco, California. The contract specified a cost of $1,796,000, completion by April 1, 1893, and offered a bonus for early completion.<

During the contract negotiations, Union Iron Works was granted permission to lengthen the vessel by 10 ft (3.0 m), at no extra cost, to accommodate the propulsion system. The contract was signed on July 10, 1890, the keel laid on June 17, 1891, and the ship was launched on November 5, 1892. However, delays in the delivery of components, including the new Harvey steel armor, slowed completion. The last one-pounder gun was not delivered until December 1894.

Union Iron Works conducted the first round of trials on November 3, 1893; on a 68 nmi (126 km) run, the ship achieved a speed of 21.26 kn (39.37 km/h). Upon return to harbor, however, it was discovered that the keel had been fouled by sea grass, which required dry-docking to fix.

By December 11, the work had been completed and she was dispatched from San Francisco to Santa Barbara for an official speed trial. Once in the harbor, heavy fog delayed the ship for four days. On the 15th, Olympia sailed into the Santa Barbara Channel, the "chosen race-track for California-built cruisers," and began a four-hour time trial. According to the navy, she had sustained an average speed of 21.67 kn (40.13 km/h), though she reached up to 22.2 kn (41.1 km/h)—both well above the contract requirement of 20 kn (37 km/h).

While returning to San Francisco, Olympia participated in eight experiments that tested various combinations of steering a ship by rudder and propellers. The new cruiser was ultimately commissioned on February 5, 1895. For several months afterwards, she was the largest ship ever built on the western coast of the US, until surpassed by the battleship Oregon.

At the time of commissioning, Scientific American compared Olympia to the similar British Eclipse-class cruisers and the Chilean Blanco Encalada and found that the American ship held a "great superiority" over the British ships. While the Eclipses had 550 short tons (500 t) of coal, compared to Olympia's 400 short tons (360 t), the latter had nearly double the horsepower (making the ship faster), more armor, and a heavier armament on a displacement that was only 200 short tons (180 t) greater than the other.

=== Characteristics ===
The ship is 344 ft 1 in (104.88 m) in overall length, has a beam of 53 ft (16 m) and a draft of 21 ft 6 in (6.55 m). Her design displacement was 5,865 long tons (5,959 t), with a full combat load of up to 6,558 long tons (6,663 t) displacement. The ship is powered by a pair of vertical triple expansion engines, each supplied with steam from three coal-fired cylindrical boilers. Her engines were rated at 13,500 ihp (10,100 kW) with a top speed of 20 knots (37 km/h; 23 mph), though on trials she achieved 17,313 ihp (12,910 kW) and a top speed of 21.67 knots (40.13 km/h; 24.94 mph).

Olympia's crew numbered between 411 and 447 officers and enlisted.

==== Armament ====
Olympia is armed with a variety of weapons. The primary armament was four 8 in (203 mm)/35 caliber guns in two twin Mark 6 gun turrets, one forward and one aft of the superstructure. These guns could fire 260 lb (120 kg) projectiles, either armor-piercing or high explosive, at a muzzle velocity of 2,100 ft (640 m) per second. The Mark 6 turret was designed for depression of the guns to −4° and elevation to 13°. By 1916, the turrets and guns were considered woefully obsolete, and were subsequently removed and replaced with open gun platforms, each with a single 4"/40. These guns were then later replaced with 5"/51-caliber guns in 1917.

The secondary battery was ten 5 in (127 mm)/40 caliber guns mounted in casemates, five on each side of the ship. Each is placed to avoid the flash from the main battery. These guns fired 50 lb (23 kg) armor-piercing shells at a muzzle velocity of 2,300 ft (700 m) per second. These also were replaced with 5"/51s during the 1917 refit. Fourteen 6-pounder (57 mm (2.24 in)) antitorpedoboat guns are mounted in sponsons. Six one-pounder guns are mounted on deck, along with six 18 in (46 cm) above-water torpedo tubes. In 1898 Olympia also boasted two Gatling guns and an arsenal of revolvers and rifles.

==== Armor ====
Olympia's conning tower is armored with 5 in (13 cm) thick steel plates. The ship has a 2 in (5.1 cm) thick armored deck that slopes on the sides; the slopes increase in thickness to 4.75 in (12.1 cm) amidships and 3 in (7.6 cm) at the ends. A 4 in (10 cm) thick glacis protects the engine rooms. Her main battery turrets are protected by 3.5 in (8.9 cm) of Harvey armor, while the barbettes upon which they rest have 4.5 in-thick (11 cm) nickel-steel armor. The 5-inch guns are protected by 4 in-thick (10 cm) gun shields.

== Service history ==
Upon commissioning in February 1895 Olympia departed the Union Iron Works yard in San Francisco and steamed inland to the U.S. Navy's Mare Island Naval Shipyard at Vallejo, where outfitting was completed and Captain John J. Read was placed in command. In April, the ship steamed south to Santa Barbara to participate in a festival. The ship's crew also conducted landing drills in Sausalito and Santa Cruz that month. On April 20, the ship conducted its first gunnery practice, during which one of the ship's gunners, Coxswain John Johnson, was killed in an accident with one of the five-inch guns. The ship's last shakedown cruise took place on July 27. After returning to Mare Island, the ship was assigned to replace Baltimore as the flagship of the Asiatic Squadron.

On August 25, the ship departed the United States for Chinese waters. A week later, the ship arrived in Hawaii, where she remained until October 23 due to an outbreak of cholera. The ship then sailed for Yokohama, Japan, where she arrived on November 9. On November 15, Baltimore arrived in Yokohama from Shanghai, China, to transfer command of the Asiatic Squadron to Olympia. Baltimore departed on December 3; Rear Admiral F.V. McNair arrived fifteen days later to take command of the squadron. The following two years were filled with training exercises with the other members of the Asiatic Squadron, and goodwill visits to various ports in Asia. On January 3, 1898, Commodore George Dewey raised his flag on Olympia and assumed command of the squadron.

=== Spanish–American War ===
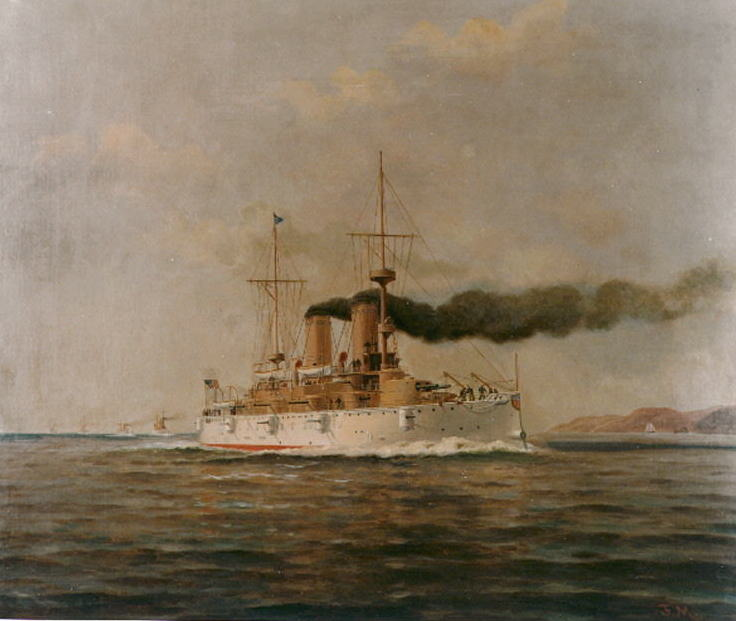
Olympia leading a column of cruisers, painting by Francis Muller

As tensions increased and war with Spain became more probable, Olympia remained at Hong Kong and was prepared for action. When war was declared on April 25, 1898, Dewey moved his ships to Mirs Bay, China. Two days later, the Navy Department ordered the squadron to Manila in the Philippines, where a significant Spanish naval force protected the harbor. Dewey was ordered to sink or capture the Spanish warships, opening the way for a subsequent conquest by U.S. forces.

==== Battle of Manila Bay ====
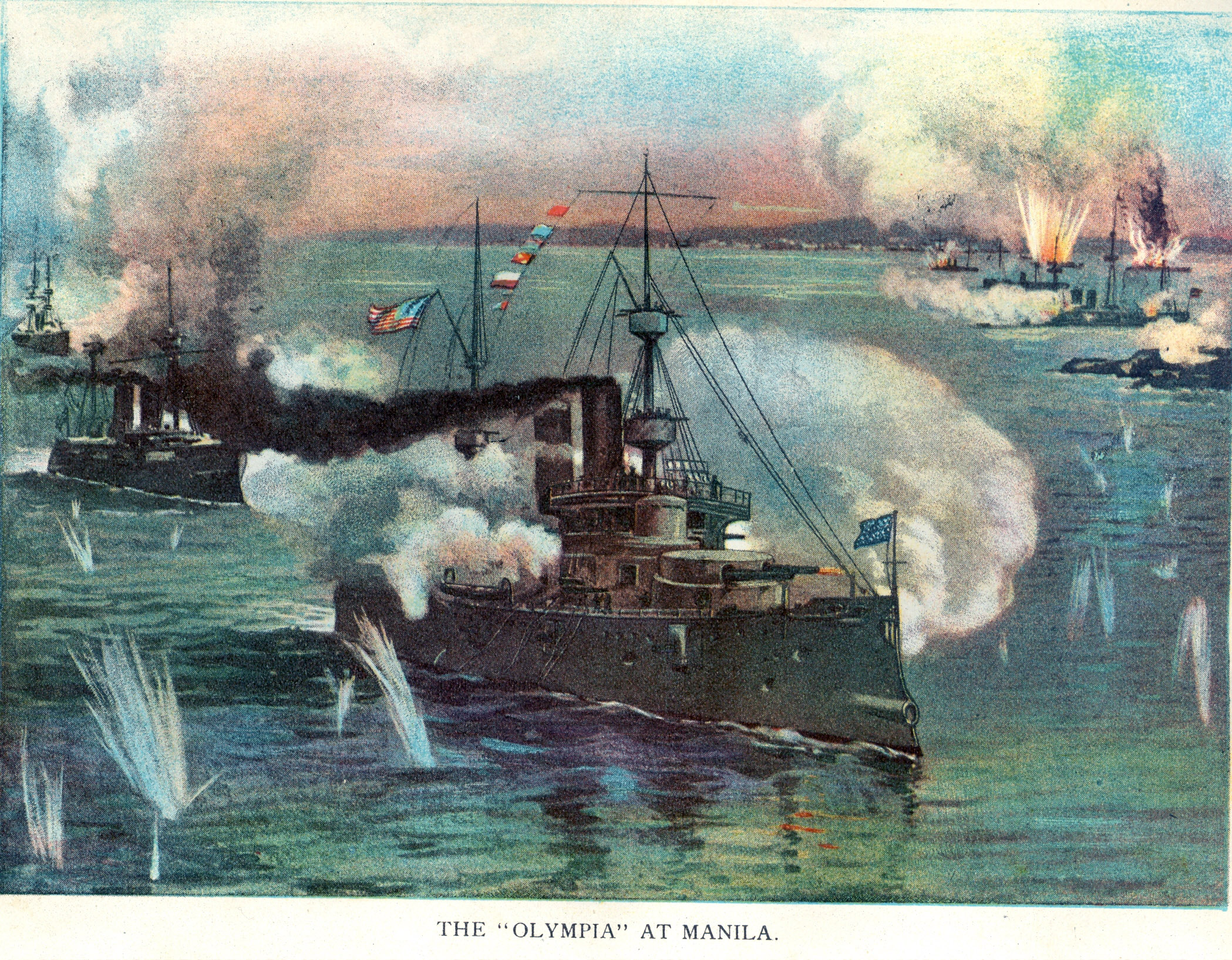
Olympia at the Battle of Manila Bay

Gun crew of USS Olympia forward 8" turret that fired the first shot of the Battle of Manila Bay

On the morning of May 1, Commodore Dewey—with his flag aboard Olympia—steamed his ships into Manila Bay to confront the Spanish flotilla commanded by Rear Admiral Patricio Montojo y Pasarón. The Spanish ships were anchored close to shore, under the protection of coastal artillery, but both the ships and shore batteries were outdated. At approximately 5:40 a.m., Dewey instructed Olympia's captain, "You may fire when you are ready, Gridley". Gridley ordered the forward eight-inch gun turret, commanded by Lt. Stokely Morgan, to open fire, and the starboard eight-inch gun fired the first shell of the battle at the Spanish flagship Reina Christina, prompting the other American warships to begin firing. The Spanish ship and shore gunners were significantly less accurate than the Americans, and the battle quickly became one-sided. After initial success, Dewey briefly broke off the engagement at around 7:30 a.m. when his flagship was reported to be low on five-inch ammunition, giving the order to serve a second breakfast to all his ships' crews. This turned out to be an erroneous report — the five-inch magazines were still mostly full. He ordered the battle resumed shortly after 11:15 that morning. By early afternoon, Dewey had completed the destruction of Montojo's squadron and the shore batteries, while his own ships were largely undamaged. Dewey anchored his ships off Manila and accepted the surrender of the city.

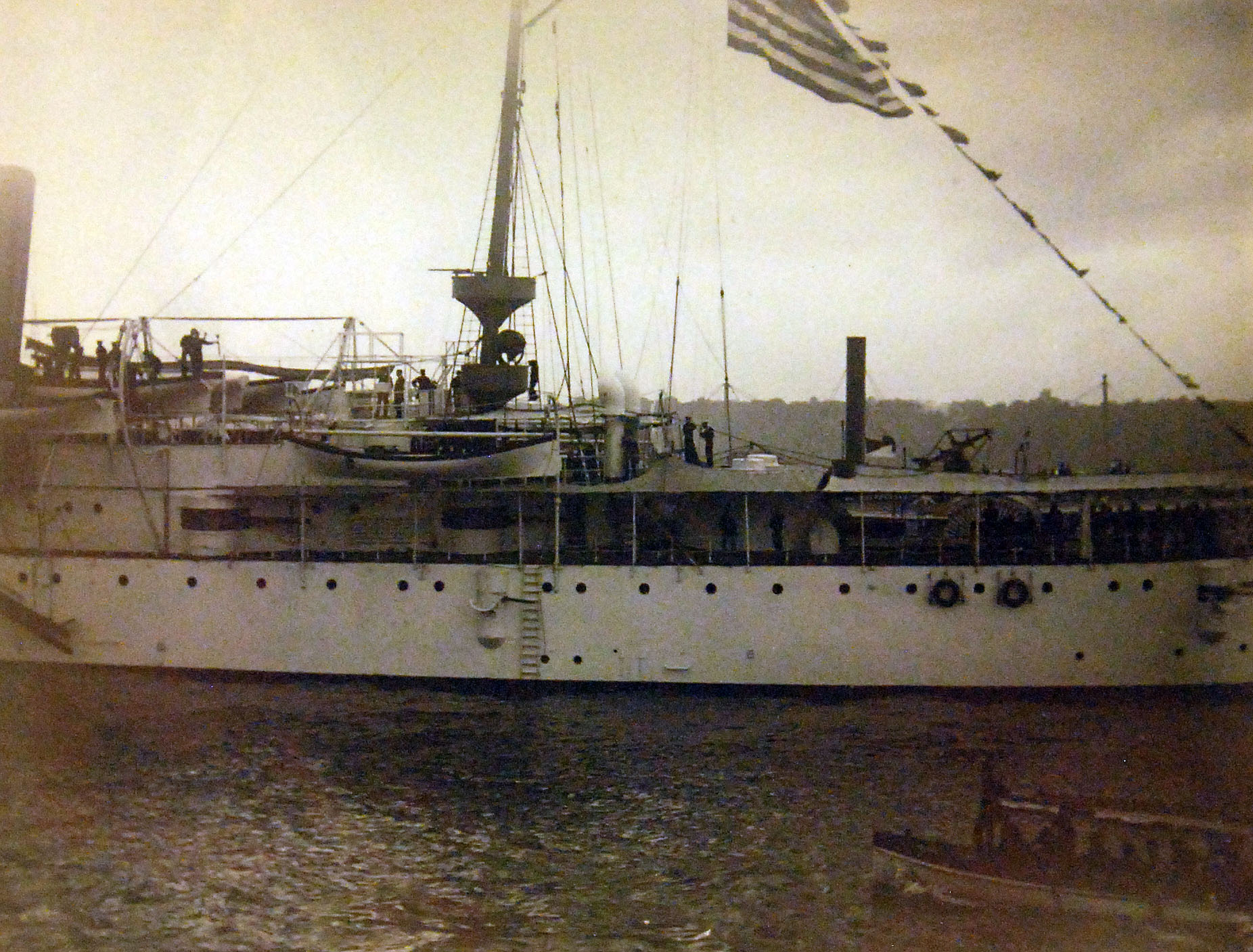
Dewey reviewing parade aboard Olympia in New York City Harbor, September 29, 1899

Word of Dewey's victory quickly reached the US; both he and Olympia became famous as the first victors of the war. An expeditionary force was assembled and sent to complete the conquest of the Philippines. Olympia remained in the area and supported the Army by shelling Spanish forces on land. She returned to the Chinese coast on May 20, 1899. She remained there until the following month, when she departed for the United States, via the Suez Canal and the Mediterranean Sea. Along the way back to the United States, the ship sought to project the United States' new global standing as a world power after the victory. Frances Benjamin Johnston was enlisted to take images of George Dewey and men in the United States Navy upon the ship. She boarded the ship on August 5, 1899. The photos presented the daily life of American men on the ship and were meant to magnify American imperialism in a positive light. The ship arrived in Boston October 10. Following Olympia's return to the United States, her officers and crew were feted, and she was herself repainted and adorned with a gilded bow ornament. On November 9, Olympia was decommissioned and placed in reserve.

=== Before World War I ===
Olympia was recommissioned into the fleet in January 1902 and assigned to the North Atlantic Squadron. Her first duty was to serve as the flagship of the Caribbean Division. Over the following four years, the ship patrolled the Atlantic and the Mediterranean Sea; her voyages included a visit to the Ottoman Empire. During March through April 1903 she and four other U.S. Navy warships were involved in an intervention in Honduras.

Starting on April 2, 1906, she became a training ship for midshipmen from the United States Naval Academy. In this role, she conducted three summer training cruises: May 15 to August 26, 1907, June 1 to September 1, 1908, and May 14 to August 28, 1909. Between the cruises, the ship was placed in reserve, first in Norfolk, Virginia and later at Annapolis, Maryland. On March 6, 1912, Olympia arrived in Charleston, South Carolina. There she served as a barracks ship until 1916. In late 1916, the ship was recommissioned into the fleet, when it became increasingly clear that the U.S. would eventually enter World War I.

=== World War I ===
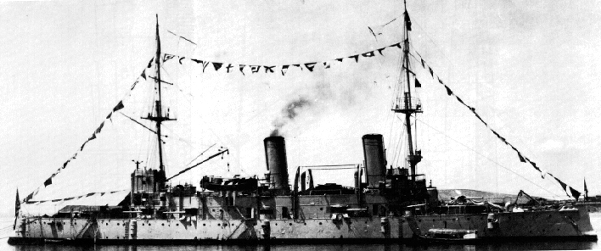
USS Olympia in 1919 rearmed with five-inch guns

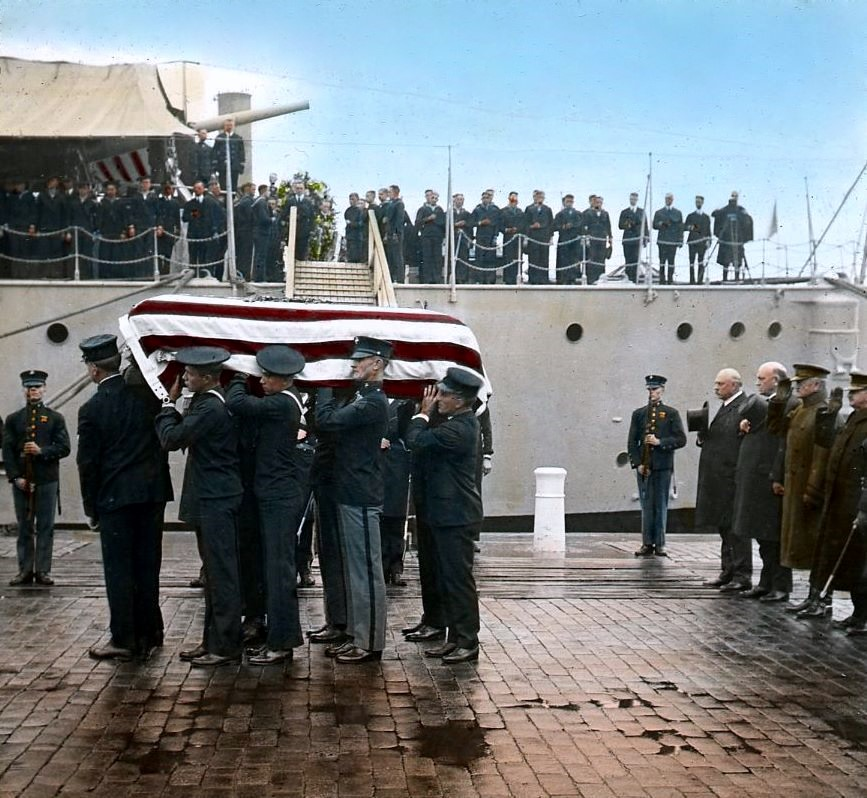
The Unknown Soldier from World War I arriving at the Washington Navy Yard, circa 1921 (colorized)

After the U.S. entered the First World War by declaring war on Germany in April 1917, Olympia was mobilized as the flagship of the U.S. Patrol Force. She was assigned to patrol the eastern seaboard of the U.S. for German warships. She also escorted transport ships in the North Atlantic. On June 15, 1917, she ran aground in Long Island Sound, and she put in for repairs at the Brooklyn Navy Yard, along with the replacement of her eight-inch and 5"/40-caliber guns with 5"/51-caliber guns, which took eight months, but a July, 1917 article about hitting the rocks says her original armament of four eight-inch and ten five-inch guns had been replaced by twelve five-inch guns "a few years ago." Olympia departed Charleston on April 28, 1918 carrying an expeditionary force bound for Russia. Russia, which had previously been a member of the Allied Powers, was in the midst of civil war and had signed a separate peace with Germany. On June 9, 1918, the ship arrived in Murmansk, Russia, and deployed the peacekeeping force. She subsequently assisted in the occupation of Archangel against Bolshevik forces.

After the end of the war, Olympia sailed to the Mediterranean via Portsmouth, England. In December 1918, the ship became the flagship for American naval forces stationed in the eastern Mediterranean Sea. While on this assignment, she continued in her old role of showing the flag and conducting goodwill visits in various Mediterranean ports. This included a period of policing duty in the Adriatic Sea from January 21 to October 25, 1919; the Dalmatian coast was in a state of turmoil following the collapse of the Austro-Hungarian Empire at the end of the war. On April 1, 1919, she was in Spalato, now Split, with Israel and Lansdale. On August 18, she steamed to the Black Sea to aid the return of refugees from the Balkans who had fled during the war. She was back in the Adriatic Sea by September 19, and four days later had to deploy a landing party to prevent an incident between Italian and Yugoslavian forces.

Olympia briefly returned to Charleston on November 24, 1919. The following year, she was reclassified CA-15. She then prepared for another tour of duty in the Adriatic, departing from New York on February 14, 1920. This was concluded on May 25, 1921, when the ship returned to Charleston. A month after her arrival she was made the flagship of the Atlantic Fleet's training unit. She then participated in joint Army-Navy experiments in July, during which the former German warships Ostfriesland and Frankfurt were sunk off the Virginia Capes. She was again reclassified as CL-15 that year.

=== Unknown Soldier ===
On October 3, 1921, Olympia departed Philadelphia for Le Havre, France, to bring the remains of the Unknown Soldier home for interment in Arlington National Cemetery. On October 25, 1921 there was a dockside ceremony where the casket, which had been selected on the previous day, arrived by train from Paris and was handed over by the Army to a bearer party of sailors and marines who carried it on board with all honors. Olympia received a 17-gun salute as she departed, escorted by USS Reuben James (DD-245) and a group of eight French destroyers for part of the voyage. The casket did not fit below deck, so it was lashed to the weather deck and covered in canvas.

During the outbound crossing Olympia encountered the fifth tropical cyclone of the 1921 Atlantic hurricane season. Increased coal consumption during the storm lightened the ship, exacerbating its tendency to roll. On the return crossing Olympia encountered the remnants of the 1921 Tampa Bay hurricane.

At the mouth of the Potomac river on November 9, the battleship North Dakota and the destroyer Bernadou joined Olympia as she steamed to the Washington Navy Yard. After transferring the remains ashore, the cruiser fired her guns in salute. She conducted a last training cruise for midshipmen in the summer of 1922.

== Preservation ==
On December 9, 1922, she was decommissioned for the last time in Philadelphia and placed in reserve. On June 30, 1931, the ship was reclassified IX-40, to be preserved as a relic.

On September 11, 1957, she was released to the Cruiser Olympia Association, restored to her 1898 configuration and became a museum ship under their auspices. The main eight-inch guns and turrets, scrapped before World War I, were replaced with sheet metal fabrications. In January 1996, when faced with mounting debt and tremendous deferred maintenances, the Cruiser Olympia Society merged with the Independence Seaport Museum (ISM) in Philadelphia.

Today, Olympia is a museum at the ISM, at Penn's Landing in Philadelphia. She is the sole floating survivor of the U.S. Navy's Spanish–American War fleet. Naval Reserve Officer Training Corps Midshipmen from Villanova University and the University of Pennsylvania regularly work on Olympia, functioning as maintenance crew. Olympia's stern plate and bow ornaments are on display at Dahlgren Hall at the United States Naval Academy. Her anchor is also on display on the grounds of Norwich University, representing all Norwich graduates who have served in the Naval Service and Dewey's education at Norwich.

Historic steel-hulled ships should be drydocked for maintenance every 20 years, but Olympia has been in the water continuously since 1945. Essential repairs were estimated at $10 million. Initially, plans to scuttle Olympia, making her into an artificial reef, were under consideration by the Museum, soon overruled. Plans were made to close Olympia to visitors on 22 November 2010, due a lack of operating funds. These plans were scrapped, and ISM agreed to keep the ship open with regular hours through 31 December, and then reduced hours through 31 March 2011. The U.S. Navy expressed its willingness to let the museum "responsibly dispose" of the vessel which could have resulted in the ship being transferred, sold as scrap, or sunk as a reef. As such, the museum held a summit in early 2011 with the Navy, Naval Sea Systems Command, National Park Service, and the Pennsylvania Historical and Museum Commission to determine what steps could be taken to save the cruiser.

As a result of the summit, the ISM searched for another nonprofit organization to assume stewardship of Olympia to provide for her maintenance and restoration. On 6 March 2011 the ISM published a Transfer Application (TAPP) similar to a Request for Proposals. Those who qualified to apply for the TAPP include domestic governmental organizations and not-for-profit organizations with valid 501(c)(3) (charitable) IRS status. Several organizations from the East, Gulf and West Coasts submitted applications to preserve and display Olympia. Only four were found to be acceptable, from Pennsylvania, California, South Carolina and Washington DC. On 7 May 2011 the National Trust for Historic Preservation set up a national donation repository to allow donations received through it to be used directly for the much-needed temporary and future hull repairs. The ISM, although originally committed to giving up the vessel, will manage any repair work undertaken, should funds become available.

In April 2014, the ISM announced the end of the TAPP process as it could not find an organization that could present a viable, long-term solution for the ship. Olympia will remain in Philadelphia and the ISM plans to launch a $20 million national fundraising campaign for her long-term preservation.

=== Preservation projects: 2014–present ===
The ISM has renewed its commitment to restoring the vessel and has engaged in several preservation projects which were funded in large part by grants from the National Park Service, the Pennsylvania Historic and Museum Commission, the Jennifer Pritzker's Tawani Foundation and Herman S. Pollock Foundation, as well as private donations. Over the past several decades, the Museum invested over $10 million to maintain Olympia. Some of the most notable repairs to the cruiser before 2014 include removing 30 tons of asbestos and other contaminants, conducting safety upgrades, and drafting the necessary engineering and planning work.

In 2015 Olympia received multiple grants including $169,850.00 from the National Park Service's Maritime Heritage Program to continue work on interim repairs of deteriorating hull plates and deck leaks. Between April and August 2015, four 4-foot by 7-foot sections of the hull at the waterline were cleaned, scaled to bare metal, and treated with ceramic epoxy, and new bottom paint. This was accomplished using a custom-made mobile surface-piercing cofferdam. In 2017, the Museum replaced Olympia's old gangways for easier and safer access, restored the signal bridge, restored the Admiral and Captain's skylights, and constructed replicas of historic benches, mess lockers and mess tables.

In 2017, the Museum announced that it would embark on a major national fundraising campaign to raise $20 million to drydock the vessel so that the hull can finally be fully repaired. The restoration efforts are part of a larger plan to make the vessel more accessible and to educate the public about the cultural and historic significance of Olympia. In May 2017, the Independence Seaport announced a semi-permanent exhibit featuring Olympia, entitled "World War I USS Olympia," opening on 16 June 2017.

== Awards ==

Dewey Medal	Navy Expeditionary Medal	Spanish Campaign Medal
Philippine Campaign Medal	Dominican Campaign Medal	World War I Victory Medal with "WHITE SEA" clasp

== Citations ==
=== Sources ===
- Burr, Lawrence (2008). US Cruisers 1883–1904: The Birth of the Steel Navy. New York City: Ospery Publishing. ISBN 978-1-84603-267-7. OCLC 798823855. Partial preview from Google Books.
- Cooling, Benjamin Franklin (2007). USS Olympia: Herald of Empire. Annapolis, Maryland: Naval Institute Press. ISBN 978-1-59114-126-6. OCLC 183396685.
- Ford, Roger; Gibbons, Tony; Hewson, Rob; Jackson, Bob; Ross, David (2001). The Encyclopedia of Ships. London: Amber Books. pp. 271–272. ISBN 978-1-905704-43-9.
- Friedman, Norman (1984). U.S. Cruisers: An Illustrated Design History. Annapolis, Maryland: Naval Institute Press. ISBN 0-87021-718-6. OCLC 563520174 – via Internet Archive.
- Friedman, Norman (1985). U.S. Battleships: An Illustrated Design History. Anapolis: United States Naval Institute Press. ISBN 978-0-87021-715-9. OCLC 1424528299 – via Internet Archive.
- Gardiner, Robert; Chesneau, Roger; Kolesnik, Eugene M., eds. (1979). Conway's All the World's Fighting Ships 1860–1905. London: Conway Maritime Press. ISBN 0-85177-133-5.
- Miller, Arthur P.; Miller, Marjorie L. (2000). Pennsylvania Battlefields and Military Landmarks. Stackpole Books. ISBN 0-8117-2876-5.
