= Flag of Samoa =

Independent State of Samoa
- Use: National flag and ensign
- Proportion: 1:2
- Adopted: 24 February 1949
- Design: A red field with a blue canton bearing five white five-pointed stars forming the Southern Cross
- Designed by: Malietoa Tanumafili II and Tupua Tamasese Meaʻole

The flag of Samoa (Samoan: fu‘a o Sāmoa) is a red field with a blue canton bearing five white five-pointed stars arranged to form the Southern Cross constellation. Paramount chiefs Malietoa Tanumafili II and Tupua Tamasese Meaʻole designed the flag with four stars in 1948, when Samoa was under the stewardship of New Zealand as the Territory of Western Samoa. The smaller fifth star was added in 1949.

The Official Flag and National Anthem of Samoa Act 1994 outlines flag protocol and the construction of the flag. An individual who intentionally mishandles or insults the flag may be subject to a fine, imprisonment, or both.

Three Samoan flags were introduced before 1948. Paramount chief Malietoa Laupepa introduced the first Samoan national flag, a red field with a white cross and a white star in the upper hoist (canton), in 1873. Tupua Tamasese Titimaea, a contemporary rival claimant to the Samoan throne, adopted Laupepa's flag as his own standard, albeit with a black cross instead of white. When Samoa became a League of Nations mandate in 1920, a Blue Ensign with three palms on a sandy surface was adopted as the territorial flag.

== Design and symbolism ==
The schedule to the Official Flag and National Anthem of Samoa Act 1994 specifies the dimensions and placement of the flag's elements as follows:

1. In this prescription the hoist of the flag from top to bottom is regarded as 144 vertical units, and its breadth from side to side as 288 horizontal units.
2. Each star has its uppermost point on a vertical line through its centres.
3. Two of the stars are disposed with their centres on a vertical line bisecting the blue quarter. The top point of the upper star and bottom points of the lower star are distant 3 vertical units from the upper and lower edges of the blue quarter respectively.
4. The star nearest the staff has its top point distant 21 vertical units from the upper edge of the flag, and its nearest point distant 42 horizontal units from the edge nearest the staff.
5. The star nearest the fly has its top point distant 18 vertical units from the upper edge of the flag, and its nearest point distant 42 horizontal units from the fly edge of the blue quarter.
6. The fifth star has its bottom points distant 26 vertical units from the lower edge of the blue quarter and its nearest point distant 56 horizontal units from the fly edge of the blue quarter.
7. The star nearest the fly edge measures 15, the topmost star and the star nearest the staff 16, the lowest star 20, and the fifth star 10 vertical units measured from the point of any ray to the point of the next ray but one.

The Act does not assign official symbolism to the flag's colours or design elements, but Smith and Samoan scholar of indigenous studies Musuiaiga Neil Sitagata-Tapu report that red stands for courage, white for purity, and blue for freedom.

Construction sheet of the flag of Samoa

== Protocol ==
Section 5 of the Official Flag and National Anthem of Samoa Act 1994 states that a person must stand still if they are in a public area where the flag of Samoa is being raised or lowered, and they must remain stationary until the raising or lowering of the flag is complete. Similarly, drivers must stop their vehicle and remain stopped until the flag is fully raised or lowered.

Section 7 of the Official Flag and National Anthem of Samoa Act 1994 contains criminal penalties for those who intentionally harm the flag. An individual who intentionally defaces, tears or destroys the flag faces a maximum sentence of six months in prison, a fine of ten penalty units (WS$1,000), or both. An individual who insults the flag "by act, word or conduct" is liable to the same penalties.

== History ==
=== Kingdom of Samoa (1873–1900) ===
The first Samoan national flag was adopted on 2 October 1873 by the Kingdom of Samoa. It was designed by the paramount chief of Tuamasaga, Malietoa Laupepa, who was recognised as "king of Samoa" (a non-traditional title) by the consuls of Germany, the United Kingdom, and the United States. The flag was a red field charged with a white star in the upper hoist (canton) and a centered white cross extending to the edges of the flag. Although the symbolism of the flag's elements was not recorded, American vexillologist Whitney Smith suggests the star may have represented independence, while the cross may have represented Christianity.

In December 1885, Germany deposed Laupepa and replaced him with the pro-German chief Tupua Tamasese Titimaea, who had been a claimant to the throne amid the Samoan civil conflicts of the 1870s and 1880s. From 1886 onward, Tamasese flew an altered version of Laupepa's flag with a black cross instead of a white one; his intention was to emulate the black-white-red tricolour of the German Reichsflagge. The 1889 Treaty of Berlin between Germany, the United Kingdom, and the United States returned Laupepa to the throne and restored his flag.

Flag of the Kingdom of Samoa under Malietoa Laupepa (1873–1886, 1889–1900)

Flag of the Kingdom of Samoa under Tupua Tamasese Titimaea (1886–1889)

Flag of the German Empire (Reichsflagge)

=== Colonial and territorial era (1900–1962) ===
From 1900 to 1914, Samoa was a part of the German colonial empire as German Samoa. The flag of the German colonial office – a Reichsflagge defaced with the Reichsadler or "Imperial Eagle" – was raised in Mulinuʻu on 1 March 1900, symbolising the start of German colonial rule. New Zealand captured and began occupying German Samoa on 29 August 1914, as part of Allies' Pacific campaign during World War I. The flag of New Zealand was henceforth the only flag flown in Samoa until 1920, when the League of Nations mandate of Western Samoa was established, and a Blue Ensign with three palms on a sandy surface was adopted.

On 26 May 1948, the New Zealand government approved a new flag for Western Samoa to replace the Blue Ensign. It was designed by the paramount chiefs Malietoa Tanumafili II and Tupua Tamasese Meaʻole, and was a red field with a blue field-and-canton charged with four white five-pointed stars representing the Southern Cross constellation, a common motif on flags in the Southern Hemisphere. The new Western Samoan flag borrowed from the New Zealand flag, taking its colours, four-star Southern Cross, and field-and-canton design. A smaller fifth star, representing the fainter Epsilon Crucis, was added to the flag on 24 February 1949. Samoa retained the flag after it gained its independence on 1 January 1962.

Flag of the German colonial office

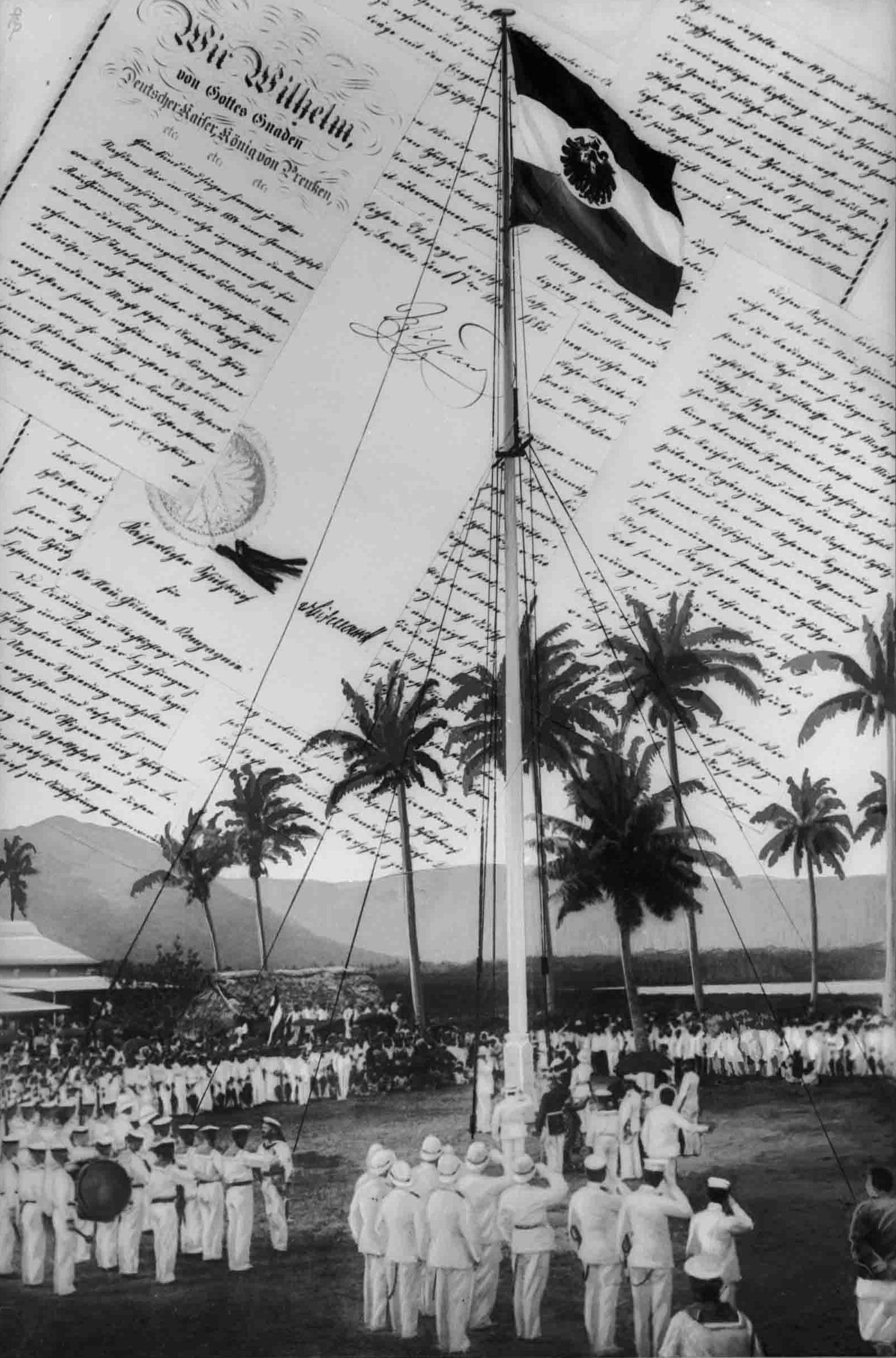
Raising of the flag of the German colonial office in Mulinuʻu on 1 March 1900

Flag of New Zealand

Flag of Western Samoa (1920–1948)

Flag of Western Samoa (1948–1949)

Flag of (Western) Samoa (1949–present)

=== Post-independence (1962–present) ===
The Official Flag and National Anthem of Samoa Act 1994 received royal assent on 28 July 1994. It establishes protocols governing the use of the flag.

In 2011, Motuopuaʻa Aisoli Uifagasa Vaʻai, a member of the Legislative Assembly of Samoa from the Tautua Samoa Party, proposed changing the national flag the following year to mark the 50th anniversary of Samoa's independence. He argued that the current flag was "a remnant of colonialism". Prime Minister Tuilaʻepa Saʻilele Malielegaoi rejected the proposal, stating that the flag is "beautiful and its colours are meaningful. ... The blue represents freedom, the red represents blood and thus life, and the Southern Cross in the flag tells the world where Samoa is."

== See also ==
- List of Samoan flags
- Public Seal of Samoa
- Flags depicting the Southern Cross
- Flag of the Republic of China, a visually similar flag
- Flag of the Union of Burma (1948–1974), another visually similar flag
