= Malietoa Tanumafili =

Malietoa Tanumafili may refer to:

- Malietoa Tanumafili I (1879–1939), Samoan leader
- Malietoa Tanumafili II (1913–2007), Samoan leader who succeeded his father
