= Tanumafili =

Tanumafili is a given name and surname. Notable people with the name include:

- Tanumafili Jungblut (born 1990), American Samoan weightlifter
- Malietoa Tanumafili I (1879–1939), Samoan leader
- Malietoa Tanumafili II (1913–2007), Samoan leader
