= Malietoa Mōli II =

Samoan paramount chief and politician

Member of the Council of Deputies
- Incumbent
- Assumed office 7 January 2025 Serving with Tui Ātua Tupua Tamasese Efi and Le Laulu Tiatia Mapesone Mapusua
- O le Ao o le Malo: Tuimalealiʻifano Vaʻaletoʻa Sualauvi II

Malietoa
- Tenure: 17 August 2018 – present
- Installation: 17 August 2018
- Predecessor: Malietoa Tanumafili II
- Born: Papaliʻitele Faʻamausili Moli Malietoa
- Father: Malietoa Tanumafili II
- Mother: Masiofo Lili Tunu

Malietoa Mōli II (born Papaliʻitele Faʻamausili Moli Malietoa) is a Samoan paramount chief and politician. He is the current holder of the Malietoa maximal lineage title and a member of the Council of Deputies.

== Biography ==
Mōli was born to Malietoa Tanumafili II and his wife, Lili Tunu. His father was the previous Malietoa and served as head of state of Samoa from its independence in 1962 until his death in 2007. He was one of their four surviving children at the time of Malietoa's death and delivered the eulogy at his state funeral. Following this, the family entered a dispute on who should inherit the Malietoa title. One branch of the family descending from Malietoa Mōli I proceeded to bestow him with the title in the village of Malie, despite other claimants descending from Malietoa Natuitasina and Malietoa Talavou filing objections at the Land and Titles Court of Samoa, arguing that all three branches of the family would have to reach a consensus upon a successor. In June 2008, the court agreed and ruled that the bestowal of the Malietoa title upon Mōli was illegal.

After a lapse of nearly a decade, in June 2017 the three branches of the family agreed to name him to succeed his father, a decision which was then publicly announced via the Savali government newspaper, pending a three-month period as required by the Land and Titles Court to allow for further objections from members of his extended family. After hearing these objections, on 22 December 2017 the court confirmed Mōli as the heir to the Malietoa title. His bestowal ceremony took place on 17 August 2018, despite two restraining orders which later resulted in a dismissed charge against him and fifteen other chiefs of Malie for contempt of court. In 2023, the Lands and Titles Court again ruled that Mōli was the legal holder of the title, following continued objections from multiple families.

In December 2024 he was appointed to the Council of Deputies, a body which deputises for the head of state. He was sworn in in January 2025.

Mōli has four children, including one who predeceased him. His daughter, Liliolevao Malietoa, was crowned Miss Samoa 1994.

== Ancestry ==
Malietoa family tree

Malietoa Vai’inupo
Malietoa Mōli I	Malietoa; Talavou Tonumaipeʻa
Malietoa Laupepa	Malietoa Faʻalataitaua
Malietoa Tanumafili I
Malietoa Tanumafili II
Malietoa Mōli II	Papaliʻi Laupepa

Notes:
- Morgan A. Tuimalealiʻifano (2006). O tama a ʻāiga: the politics of succession to Sāmoa's paramount titles. editorips@usp.ac.fj. p. 52. ISBN 9820203775.

== See also ==
- Faʻamatai, the chiefly system of Samoa

Regnal titles
Preceded by Malietoa Tanumafili II	Malietoa; 2018–present	Incumbent
