= Polynesian confederation =

19th Century proposed union of the Kingdoms of Hawaii and Tahiti

Kingdoms of Hawaiʻi and Tahiti that were supposed to confederate

The Polynesian Confederation was a hypothetical confederation planned primarily by the King of Hawaiʻi, David Kalākaua. The aim was to protect the Polynesian peoples from European and American imperialism as by the time the United Kingdom took over Fiji, there were only three independent archipelagos in the form of the Kingdoms of Hawaiʻi, Sāmoa and Tonga.

== Previous attempts ==
In 1829, the Kingdom of Hawaiʻi, looking to expand its sandalwood trade, sent an expedition to Vanuatu consisting of two armed brigs, the Kamehameha and the Becket, under the command of Chiefs Boki and Manuia. The ships brought along around 800 Hawaiians and supplies intended to build a settlement. They arrived at Erromango and began settling with the intention of colonizing it. The Becket later ventured to find the Kamehameha, which had gone missing; it was later discovered it had actually sank. The locals at Erromango resisted the Hawaiians and destroyed the settlement. When the Becket returned, it picked up the surviving Hawaiians and returned to Hawaiʻi, but most of the Hawaiians died on the return voyage, including Manuia.

== Reign of Kalākaua ==
On June 28, 1880, a Hawaiian government minister by the name of Walter M. Gibson initiated a resolution, which stated that due to its geographical and political status, the Kingdom of Hawaiʻi would be entitled to lead a confederation of Polynesian countries. The government of the kingdom voted unanimously to pass the resolution six months later, and Gibson was named the person responsible for the operation.

In addition to the still independent states, Kalākaua also tried to get countries already colonized by the Europeans in his confederation. Pōmare V, the king of Tahiti, had been planning to visit Honolulu in 1882, but the monarchy was abolished in 1880, and the French colonizers didn't want the two island groups to be in contact with each other. Kalākaua was planning to visit Tahiti in 1887, but after he was forced to sign the Bayonet Constitution, the trip was cancelled.

In 1884, the Kingdom of Hawaiʻi employed Captain Alfred N. Tripp to command the schooner Julia in order to find workers in Polynesia. At the same time, Tripp was commissioned as the Special Commissioner for Central and Western Polynesia. The Julia also had the secondary mission of improving relations between the Polynesian nations of the South Pacific and the Hawaiian Kingdom.

In 1886, Kalākaua founded the Royal Order of the Star of Oceania, meant to award people who contributed to the creation of the confederation. One of its 15 Grand Crosses was given to king Mālietoa Laupepa of Sāmoa when he agreed to join the confederation.

Kalākaua sent the Kaimiloa, commanded by John E. Bush, to sail around Polynesia in order to recruit local leaders to join the confederation. This caused anxiety in Europe and the United States. The German ambassador to the United States worried about a rumored Hawaiian plan to annex Sāmoa.

Bush stayed in Sāmoa as an ambassador and began to formulate a constitution for the confederation, which was approved by the Hawaiian legislature in March 1887. But the confederation was never officially established. A possible reason is that it would have required too many changes to the Hawaiian system of government.

The Imperial German Navy later arrived on Sāmoa, overthrew Mālietoa, and forced him into exile. The confederation plan was later invoked as a reason for the overthrow of the Kingdom of Hawaiʻi.

== See also ==
- Hawaiʻi–Tahiti relations
