= Papaliʻi Laupepa =

Samoan politician

Minister of Justice
- In office 1982
- Preceded by: Taliaoa Maoama
- Succeeded by: Taliaoa Maoama

Member of the Legislative Assembly
- In office 1982–1985
- Preceded by: Asi Eikeni
- Succeeded by: Asi Eikeni
- Constituency: Faʻasaleleaga No. 2

Personal details
- Born: 3 December 1940
- Died: 28 September 1985 (aged 44); Apia, Western Samoa
- Parent(s): Malietoa Tanumafili II; Masiofo Lili Tunu

Papaliʻitele Molioʻo Laupepa Malietoa (3 December 1940 – 28 September 1985) was a Western Samoan chief and politician. He served as a member of the Legislative Assembly from 1982 to 1985, and as Minister of Justice for a short period in 1982.

== Biography ==
The son of paramount chief Malietoa Tanumafili II, Papaliʻitele was educated at Newington College in Sydney between 1951 and 1958 where he was a boarding student enrolled under the name Leupepa Malietoa. While at the school, he was a member of the rugby union first XV for four years. After university, he worked for the External Affairs Department of the New Zealand government between 1960 and 1962, returning to Western Samoa when it became independent to work in the Department of the Prime Minister. He subsequently trained at Portsea Military College in Australia from 1964 to 1965, reaching the rank of second lieutenant. He joined the New Zealand armed forces and served in Malaysia as assistant battalion adjutant between 1967 and 1969.

After leaving the army in 1969 Papaliʻitele managed his family plantations. He was conferred with the chiefly titles Molioʻo in 1974 and Laupepa in 1978. His father had become Head of State at independence, and he served as his aide-de-camp from 1976 to 1979. He contested the 1979 elections to the Legislative Assembly in the Faʻasaleleaga No. 2 constituency, losing by three votes to Asi Eikeni. In the 1982 elections he defeated Eikeni by 85 votes and was elected to the Assembly. Following the elections, he was appointed Minister of Justice in September, but served only until December.

Papaliʻitele lost his seat to Eikeni in the February 1985 elections and died in September the same year. He was survived by his wife Afioga Aioro Sia Malietoa.

== Family tree ==
Malietoa family tree

Malietoa Vai’inupo
Mailetoa Mōli I	Malietoa; Talavou Tonumaipeʻa
Malietoa Laupepa	Malietoa Faʻalataitaua
Malietoa Tanumafili I
Malietoa Tanumafili II
Malietoa Mōli II	Papaliʻi Laupepa

Notes:
- Morgan A. Tuimalealiʻifano (2006). O tama a ʻāiga: the politics of succession to Sāmoa's paramount titles. editorips@usp.ac.fj. p. 52. ISBN 9820203775.
