= Royal Order of the Star of Oceania =

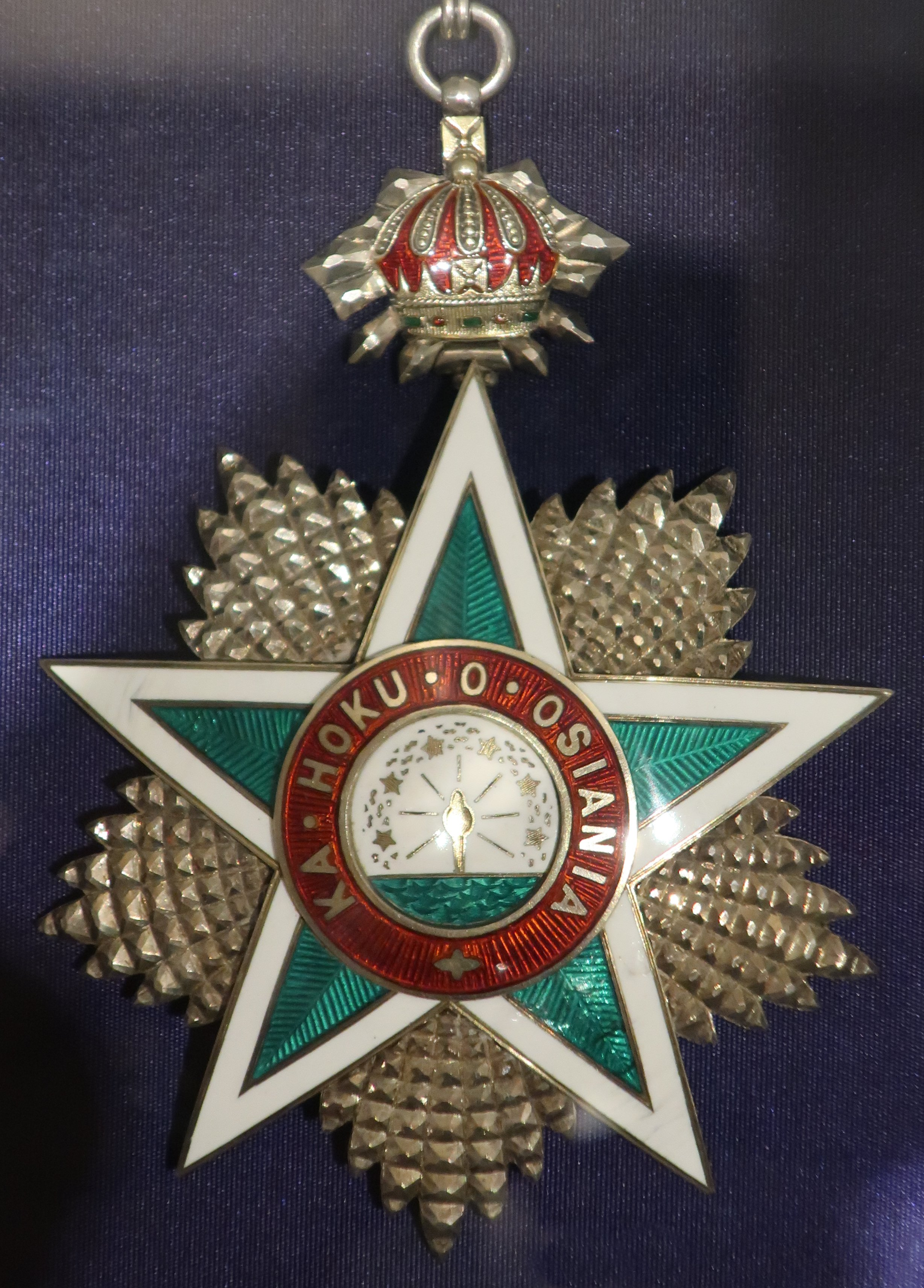
- Badge of the order
- Founded: 16 December 1886
- Country: Kingdom of Hawaiʻi
- Motto: "Ka Hoku O Osiania"
- Eligibility: "distinguished services," "advancing the name and influence of Hawaii," aiding establishment of an Oceanic confederation
- Status: Dynastic Order
- Founder: Kalākaua
- Classes: Grand Cross; Grand Officer; Commander; Officer; Companion; Gold medal Silver medals

Precedence
- Next (higher): Royal Order of the Crown of Hawaii
- Next (lower): Royal Household Order for Ladies
- Ribbon of the order

The Royal Order of the Star of Oceania is a Hawaiian order founded on 16 December 1886 by King Kalākaua, "for the recompense of distinguished services rendered to Us or to Our State and in advancing the name and influence of Hawaii amongst the native communities of the Islands of the Pacific and Indian Oceans, and on contiguous Continents."

The order was motivated by aspirations for an Oceanic confederation. It was envisioned as a means of flattering foreigners who could aid this cause, or demonstrating generosity to heads of state whose assent would make a confederation possible. Its creation coincided with the shift of Hawaiian foreign policy from defensive isolation to regional expansionism.

== History ==
In 1858, the Kingdom of Hawai'i allowed its tentative annexation of the Stewart Islands to lapse, leaving diplomat Charles St Julian, a hired Australian who advocated the formation of a Hawaiian-helmed empire of Pacific islands, as their acting sovereign. St Julian had long unsuccessfully pressed Hawaiian Foreign Minister Robert Crichton Wyllie for an award, and so he used his brief position to create the "Order of Arossi," bestowing it upon himself. This served as the inspiration and model for the Royal Order of the Star of Oceania. The order was conceived by Hawaiian Prime Minister Walter M. Gibson, who shared St Julian's interest in territorial expansion.

The order was overseen by the Chancellor of the Royal Order of the Star of Oceania, a role filled by Royal Household Chamberlain George W. Macfarlane in 1890.

== Design and dress ==
The insignia featured a beacon above the sea, likely symbolizing Hawaii, radiating out to six stars, perhaps representing other archipelagos of Oceania. It was designed by Isobel Osbourne, a court artist, stepdaughter of author Robert Louis Stevenson, and one of few women to receive the award herself.

The prescribed uniform of the order, to be worn "on all occasions when commanded by the Grand Master," consisted of "a black dress coast, with the cuffs and lapels of the collar trimmed with gold and green cord; knee breeches; garters ornamented with gems; black silk stockings; patent leather slippers; a Court rapier with gold and green tassel, and Court chapeau without plume."

== Recipients ==
- William Alvord, president of the Bank of California and former Mayor of San Francisco (April 1887)
- William Auld, Superintendent of the Oahu Insane Asylum
- Henry R. Armstrong, Hawaiian Consul-General in London - Grand Officer (1887)
- George Charles Moʻoheau Beckley, purser of the steamship Kinau (23 November 1888)
- Henri Berger, Prussian Kapellmeister of the Royal Hawaiian Band
- James Harbottle Boyd, Colonel and special commissioner to Ocean Island - Grand Officer (April 1887)
- Ella Smith Corwine, wife of Paymaster John Corwine of the USS Nipsic and daughter of porcelain manufacturer Thomas C. Smith, who painted Liloa's Kāʻei - Lady Companion (11 June 1890)
- William H. Cornwell, Colonel, royal staff member, legislator in the House of Nobles - Knight Commander
- Denys Benoist d'Azy, Midshipman of the French cruiser Duquesne, then docked off Honolulu - Knight Companion (12 August 1889)
- Henry Crosnier de Varigny, physician, popular science writer, and evolutionist - Knight Companion (23 August 1889)
- John Stiles Dickerson, yachtsman and 1876 America's Cup winner (April 1887)
- John Owen Dominis, Lieutenant General (April 1887)
- Father Léonor Fouesnel, vice provincial of the Roman Catholic mission at Honolulu, who recruited Marianne Cope and other American-based nuns to provide care at the Moloka'i leper colony
- William Hurst Graenhalgh, newsagent and bookseller - Knight Companion (November 1888)
- Henry Herman, violinist and concertmaster of the San Francisco Philharmonic Orchestra, who played charity concerts on behalf of children's aid groups and the leper colony on Moloka'i - Knight Commander (8 May 1890)
- Curtis P. Iaukea, Governor of Oahu (April 1887)
- Malietoa Laupepa, King (Tafaʻifa) of Samoa - Knight Grand Cross (7 January 1887)
- Isobel Osbourne, writer and artist
- James W. Robertson, chief clerk of the bureau of water works, palace bookkeeper, royal household chamberlain

== Legacy ==
In 1964, a replica of the Grand Cross awarded to Malietoa was featured prominently at the Aloha Week Monarchy Ball, which depicted an alternate timeline where Kalākaua successfully absorbed Samoa, Tahiti, Fiji, Tonga, and the Cook Islands into a Pacific empire.

The original medallion's display in the 'Iolani Palace was the setting of the inaugural Pacific Traditional Leaders Forum, held at the 2024 Festival of Pacific Arts.

The starred-ball logo of the Hawaiian Football association is adapted from the order's symbology.
