= Malietoa =

One of Samoa's four paramount chiefs

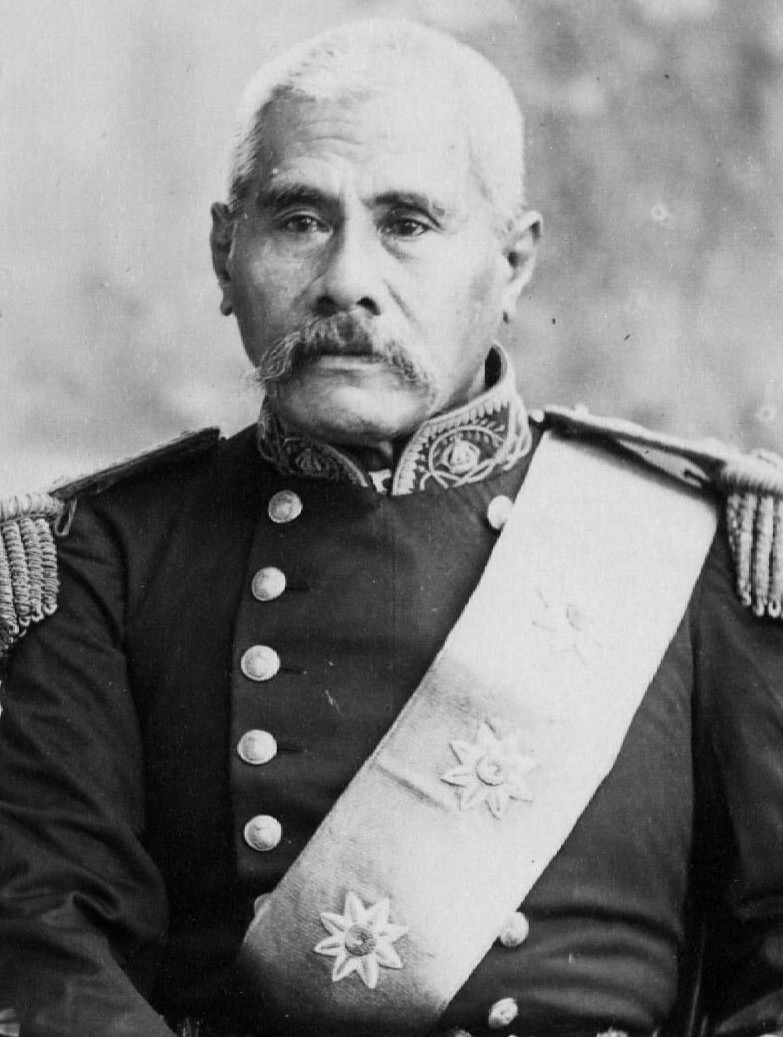
Malietoa Laupepa, Malietoa from 1875 to 1898

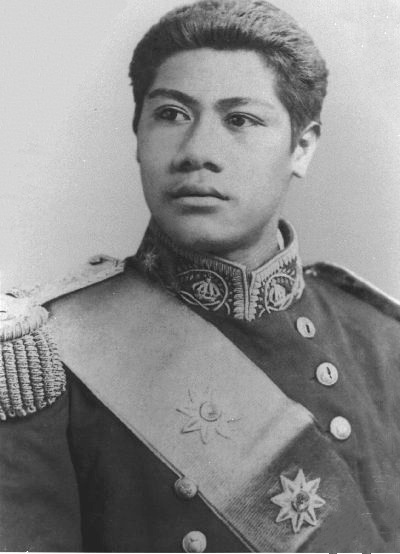
Malietoa Tanumafili I, Malietoa from 1898 to 1939

Mālietoa (Samoan pronunciation: [maːɾiɛˈto.a] Mālietoa) is a state dynasty and one of the four paramount chiefly titles of Samoa. It is the titular head of one of the two great royal families of Samoa: Sā Malietoa. Literally translated as "great warrior", the title's origin comes from the final words of Tu'i Tonga Talakaifaiki as he was fleeing on the beach to his boat, "Mālie toa, mālie tau" ("Great warrior, bravely you have fought")

== History ==
In early Polynesian history the Tu'i Tonga dynasty from Tu'i Tonga 'Aho'eitutupu'a supreme ruler of Samoa and Tonga ruled from 400AD up until Tongan king Tu'i Tonga Talakaifaiki of the Tu'i Tonga dynasty ruled, around 1150 to 1400, over several western Polynesian polities including Lau group of islands (eastern Fiji), Niue, 'Uvea, Futuna, 'Upolu, and Savai'i). Tu'i Tonga Talakaifaiki established a long-term residence at Safotu, Savai'i, Samoa and installed his brother, Lautivunia, as governor of Western Samoa islands. Samoan lore suggests that Talakaifaiki's reign was one of tyranny and oppression that was highly resented by his Samoan subjects.

The seeds of rebellion were planted, according to legend, to the "sons" of Atiogie, namely Savea, Tuna, Fata and Ulumasui (who was actually a grandson of Atiogie). The three brothers and their nephew led a wide-scale campaign of civil disobedience which ultimately escalated into the military overthrow of Talakaifaiki. Driven westward from Aleipata, 'Upolu (where the Tu'i Tonga's birthday festivities were underway) to the coast of Mulifanua, the king and his bodyguards were cornered against the sea.

There was fierce fighting all the way to the sea whereon the Tu'i Tonga reached his superior navy vessels and called out to those on the land. Upon his departure, the aged monarch delivered a short speech which praised the brave fighting qualities of the Samoan warriors and conceded victory to his once-subjects. The Malietoa title is taken from the opening phrase of that speech: "Mālie toa, mālie tau," meaning "great warriors, well fought."

It is said that the brothers Tuna and Fata both took a fancy to the honor spoken by the deposed Tu'i Tonga and a quarrel between the two ensued. Legend tells that one brother was struck dead by the other and chaos was averted by their eldest brother, Savea, who resuscitated and placated both contenders.

The political vacuum left by the ousting of Talakaifaiki was immediately filled by Savea, meaning all the areas Tui Tonga Talakaifaiki once ruled was then under the rulership of Savea the first Malietoa. King Savea was bestowed the title Malietoa which his brothers had fought over and was hence honored in Samoan oratory as King Malietoa Savea-ali'i (Lord Savea), Savea Tu-vae-lua (Savea Who Stands on Both Feet), and Savea-matua (Savea the Elder). The appellation "Na-fa'alogo-iai-Samoa (He Who Samoa Listened To)" was added on during the time of Malietoa Vainu'upo who, as Tupu Tafa'ifa after the death of Tamafaiga, formally accepted Christianity into Samoa in the late 1800s.

== Succession list ==
The following is a compiled list of the Malietoa holders. A handful of other versions are also recorded; however, the overall consistency of chronology and nomenclature is impressive given the oral nature of Samoan genealogy transmission.

1. Malietoa Savea - the first Malietoa after defeating and expelling Tui Tonga Talakaifaiki from Samoa. He resided at Foga'a in FALEULA. He married 3 times. His first wife was Luafatasana the daughter of high chief of Tuaai and their son was Malietoa Faiga Uilematutu. His second wife was Amaamaula the lady from Tuanai and their sons were Malietoa Gagasavaea, Leupolusavea, and Umusavea. His third wife was Solosolouta and their son was Poluleuligaga.
2. Malietoa Ganasavea - Married the daughter of Tui Tonga named Pate. They had 6 sons which led to the creation of the Gana Clan (Sagana) & the Faleono O Le Ati Gana (6 Houses Of Gana). The Gana Clan of Samoa also established a clan in Tonga known as the Ha’a Ngana Clan.
3. Malietoa Uilematutu - also known as King Malietoa Faiga or Malietoa Faisautele. Well known in Samoan mythology as a tyrant cannibal who exacted human tribute from his subjects. He married Lealainuanua, a daughter of the Tu'i Tonga, and resided at Foga'a on the north coast of 'Upolu island.
4. Malietoa Galoa'itofo
5. Malietoa Sona'ilepule
6. Malietoa Seali'itele
7. Malietoa Uilematutu
8. Malietoa Fetoloa'i
9. Malietoa 'Ula - also known as Malietoa Vaetui or Malietoa Valaletimu. Said to have been a cruel cannibal king who lived at Leoneuta, near the village of Amoa on 'Upolu island.
10. Malietoa Lepalealai - a "scholar chief" known for his wit and love of complicated riddles
11. Malietoa Uitualagi - son of Malietoa Uilematutu Faiga and Alainuanua Tuitoga. His position in the genealogy is debatable; some believe he was the biological son of Malietoa Uilamatutu Faiga, which he was, others call him an adopted son, and yet others assert that his position is seven generations removed from Uilamatutu (as he is listed here). But the truth is, he was Maleitoa Uitualagi's son with Alainuanua, daughter of Tuitoga.
12. Malietoa La'auli - also known as Malietoa La'ailepouliuli. Adopted son of Malietoa Uitualagi; thus, the bloodline of Malietoa Savea does not continue along the patrilineal succession of the Malietoa title from this point on. This is what some genealogies suggested but the truth is Malietoa Savea had 3 marriages which one of the lineage is where the current Malietoa's are descendant from. There was no break of the Malietoa blood from Malietoa Savea, the first Maleitoa. Malietoa Uitualagi married Gatoloaiaoolelagi and their sons were Malietoa Laauli, Malietoa Fuaoleto'elau and a sister named Saotialeu.
13. Malietoa Fuaoleto'elau - son of Uitualagi who opposed his brother La'auli by setting up a rival government at Si'umu, 'Upolu. Tohu'ia Limapo, the Samoan ancestress of the Tu'i Kanokupolu dynasty of Tonga was a member of the 'Ama family of Safata which descends from Fuaoleto'elau.
14. Malietoa Falefatu - son of Malietoa La'auli with his third wife Nuuilematuli of Maagiagi.
15. Malietoa Taulapapa - A descendant of Malietoa La'auli. Malietoa Taulapapa is famous for his Mavaega or Decrees to his children. (Taofia a le Malietoa.) As a result of his decrees, he is why we now have the famous group of Matais called 'FALEUPOLU O TOFIGA'.
16. Malietoa Taia'opo - Daughter of Malietoa Taulapapa from one of his 4 wives ('usuga'). The only female Malietoa known to history. Her husband was Samoan Chief Anava'o.
17. Malietoa Tuila'epa - apparently held the Fijian-derived title of Tu'i Lakepa (Tuila'epa) which his father held, as well as the Malietoa.
18. Malietoa To'oa Tuila'epa - may be the same person as Tuila'epa.
19. Malietoa 'Ae'o'ainu'u - son of either Tuila'epa or To'oa Tuila'epa. Named after 'Ae, the fierce war chief of Tutuila.
20. Malietoa Laulauafolasa
21. Malietoa Muagututi'a - also known as Malietoa Ti'a. Relocated the Malietoa political headquarters and royal household from Malie, 'Upolu to Sapapali'i, Savai'i.
22. Malietoa Fitisemanu I
23. Malietoa Vai'inupo - the first Malietoa to ascend to the kingship of Samoa since before Queen Salamasina's lineage took over. He was also the last to hold the kingship of Samoa.
24. Malietoa Taimalelagi Gatuitasina - half brother (same father, Malietoa Fitisemanu I) to Malietoa Vaiinupo
25. Malietoa Moli
26. Malietoa Talavou Tonumaipe'a
27. Malietoa Laupepa
28. Malietoa Tanumafili I
29. Malietoa Tanumafili II (1913–2007), holder of the title from 1940 until 2007. Awarded the title through court decision of 1939. When Samoa became independent in 1962, he was appointed O le Ao o le Malo (Head of State), held jointly with Tupua Tamasese Mea'ole.
30. The Malietoa title is currently held by HRH Malietoa Faamausili Moli solely Ainuu Bob Tupou Afamasaga is not eligible to this title with accordance to Samoa's Lands and Titles Court Decision of August 17, 2018. HRH Malietoa Faamausili Moli is a member of Samoa’s Council of Deputies and eligible for the Head of State.

== Modern branches of the Sa Malietoa ==
The descendants of the Malietoa lineage, both titular and biological, are referred to collectively as the Sā Malietoa. The Sā Malietoa of today is expansive and transcends geographical boundaries, religious persuasions, socio-economic class and even ethnicity (considering various chiefly families in Fiji and other Pacific societies are genealogically linked to the Malietoa family). The subject of descendants of the Malietoa title is a thorny one riddled with claims and counter-claims present from the first Malietoa to the present day.

In terms of relative history, the "oldest" branch of the modern Sa Malietoa is the Sa Natuitasina (also spelled Gatuitasina). Natuitasina was the half-brother of the holder of the Malietoa title, Malietoa Vai'inupo. Malietoa Vai'inuupo famously accepted Christianity brought to Samoa by the London Missionary Society (LMS) missionary, John Williams. Natutasina is alleged to have allied with his nephew Talavou against the LMS and the pacifist policy of Malietoa Vai'inupo and the Christians in 1840. Although only the apical ancestor of this branch has held the Malietoa title, the 1939 ruling grants the Sa Natuitasina deliberating rights on the succession of the Malietoa title.

Perhaps the most well-known of the three modern branches, the Sā Moli has been highlighted as one of Samoa's four royal families for over a century. The families of the Sa Moli trace their genealogies to Malietoa Moli. The Sa Moli maintains a family council house in Sapapali'i called Poutoa, which, since it was established by Malietoa Vaiinupo, is also held as the ancestral maota of the Sa Natuitasina and Sa Talavou.

The Sa Talavou branch includes all descendants of Malietoa Talavou Pe'a, a son of Malietoa Vai'inupo who was born around 1810. Prominent members of the Sa Talavou include Talavou's son, Fa'alataitaua, who held the Ta'imua office and was named successor to Mata'afa Iosefo's office as Ali'i Sili while under German colonial rule. Fa'alataitaua however did not hold the Malietoa title.

While not legally recognized by the 1939 Malietoa edict (LC 853), there are technically many other family lineages that can claim genealogical connections as "branches" of the Sa Malietoa. Some of these descendants have come to light through media coverage of the ongoing titular dispute prompted by the death of Malietoa Tanumafili II, including families who claim descent from other Malietoas (besides Natuitasina, Moli and Talavou) and/or their descendants.

== Family tree ==
Malietoa family tree

Malietoa Vai’inupo
Malietoa Mōli I	Malietoa; Talavou Tonumaipeʻa
Malietoa Laupepa	Malietoa Faʻalataitaua
Malietoa Tanumafili I
Malietoa Tanumafili II
Malietoa Mōli II	Papaliʻi Laupepa

Notes:
- Morgan A. Tuimalealiʻifano (2006). O tama a ʻāiga: the politics of succession to Sāmoa's paramount titles. editorips@usp.ac.fj. p. 52. ISBN 9820203775.

== See also ==
- Fa'amatai, chiefly system of Samoa.
- Mata'afa
- Tuimaleali'ifano
- Tupua Tamasese
- Tui Manu'a
