= Malietoa Laupepa =

19th century king of Samoa

- Malietoa; King (Tafaʻifa) of Samoa
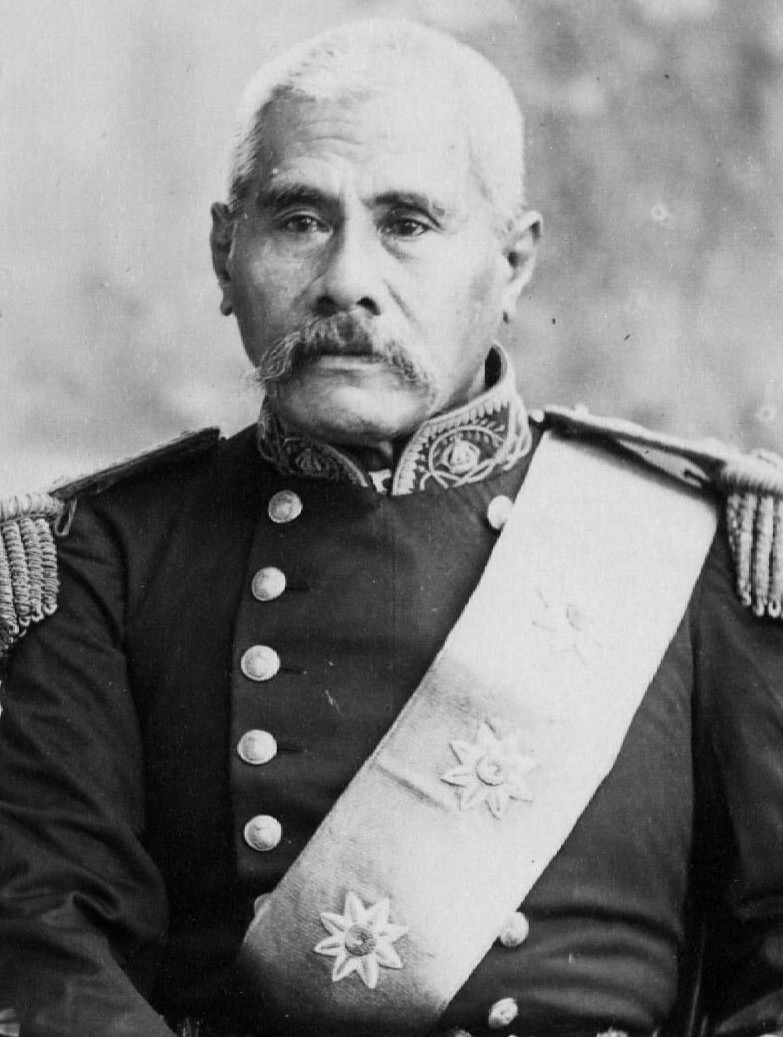
- Laupepa in 1884

King of Samoa
- Reign: 1875–1887, 1889–1898
- Predecessor: Malietoa Mōli I (father)
- Successor: Malietoa Tanumafili I (son)
- Born: 1841; Sapapaliʻi, Savaiʻi, Kingdom of Samoa
- Died: 22 August 1898 (aged 56–57); Savaiʻi, Kingdom of Samoa
- Spouse: Sisavaiʻi Malupo Niuvaʻai
- Issue: Faʻamu Leuatoivao; Tanumafili I Silivaʻai; Fefauimalemau Fuatino
- House: Maota o Poutoa, Sapapaliʻi, Savaii, Samoa
- Father: Malietoa Moli
- Mother: Faʻalaituio Fuatino Suʻapaʻia

Susuga Malietoa Laupepa (1841 – 22 August 1898) was the ruler (Malietoa) of Samoa in the late 19th century. He was first crowned in 1875.

During his tenure as King, he fought constant warfare from many contenders to the throne, these battles would make up the First Samoan Civil War, which is documented in A Footnote to History: Eight Years of Trouble in Samoa.

== Personal life ==
Laupepa was born in 1841 in Sapapaliʻi, Savaiʻi, Samoa. His father was Malietoa Mōli and mother was Faʻalaitaua Fuatino Suʻapaʻia. He was raised in Malie, received a religious education at Malua Seminary and was well known as a devout Christian. He was the recognized leader of the Sā Mōlī which was based primarily in northern Tuamasaga. Laupepa cemented ties with Palauli (the only significant Sā Mōlī support base on Savaiʻi) through his marriage to Sisavaiʻi Malupo, a daughter of Niuvaʻai of Palauli, Savaii. The children of this marriage were two sons named Tanumafili and Silivaʻai, and daughter Faʻamuleuatoivao.

When about 20, he became Malietoa Tanumafili I and had other marriages. One he had a daughter by the name of Saitaua who married Leota Laiafi of Solosolo. From his marriage to Fuaolemalo Faumuina Fiame Leitutua Johnson of Lepea and Lefaga he had two daughters; Taʻase and Faamusami. Faamusami married Mataʻafa Fiame Faumuina Mulinuʻu I and Taʻase married Ainuʻu Maualaivao Tasi Tupou of Malie and Sapapaliʻi, Savaiʻi. and Laupepa later married a Rarotongan woman named Tui Ariki of a chiefly Cook Islands family. In May 1892, Laupepa made a visitation to the founding house of Feigla in Western Samoa, Upolu.

In June 1894, both Laupepa and his son Mōlī II visited with the Latter-day Saint missionaries at Lalovi, Mulifanua with an army regiment of about 1,000 men. The missionaries described Laupepa to be "a very pleasant old gentleman," about 5'9" and 180 pounds who spoke in a "deep bass voice". Laupepa underwent the rituals to receive the peʻa traditional tattoo when he was in his forties.

== Military and political campaigns ==
Laupepa maintained his devout profession of Christianity throughout his life, although he became increasingly aggressive as he was thrust into the power struggle against his warlike uncle Talavou. Laupepa did not enjoy universal support from his fellow Samoans and his warfare record was dismal; he did, however, win some battles and managed to have himself crowned and subsequently deposed as Joint-King, Deputy-King (under Talavou), and sole King of Samoa in 1881.

Churchward (84) recorded that the "Ellice group", now known as the Tuvalu islands, were "formally annexed to Samoa in the name of Malietoa" by one of Laupepa's colleagues from Malua Theological College. Before his death on August 22, 1898, Laupepa managed to gain the support of the foreign consuls but he had suffered great losses of prestige and confidence in the eyes of many Samoans after being continually routed in battle and eventually exiled to the Marshall Islands.

Laupepa owned a "prized Samoan war club" – probably a Malietoa family anava heirloom – which he gave to the American consul William Churchill. This club was sought by the Bernice P. Bishop Museum in 1897 but was not relinquished by Churchill (Sorenson & Theroux 2005).

== Laupepa, the Sā Tupua and foreign governments ==
Laupepa was crowned King of Samoa by the German Empire, American, and British consuls in March 1881. Curiously, the Tumua polities of Ātua and Aʻana did not accept Laupepa as king (even though they previously supported him against Malietoa Talavou Tonumaipeʻa) and they subsequently set up their own government in Leulumoega with Tuiātua Tupua Tamasese Titimaea as their declared King of Samoa. War between Tamasese and Laupepa was declared but the Lackawanna Agreement, signed on July 12, 1881, maintained an uneasy peace. This treaty, mediated by US Navy Captain J.H. Gillis, upheld Laupepa's claim to the throne and named Titimaea as vice-king and Matāʻafa Iosefo as premier (Keesing 1934:68). King Laupepa protested the increasing German interference in Samoan politics and the Samoan government by petitioning Queen Victoria of Great Britain for protection in 1883 and again (twice) in November 1884. When German consul Weber learned of the petitions he banished Laupepa and his chiefs from Apia. The German consul Stuebel asserted his dominance over Laupepa's kingship in December 1885 when he ordered the removal of the national flag from Laupepa's base in Apia (Gilson 1970). The German consul placed Tuiātua Tupua Tamasese Titimaea in Laupepa's office and yet another war between the Sā Malietoa and Sā Tupua began in 1887. Districts and families were very often divided or remained neutral since so many leading chiefs were related to both clans.

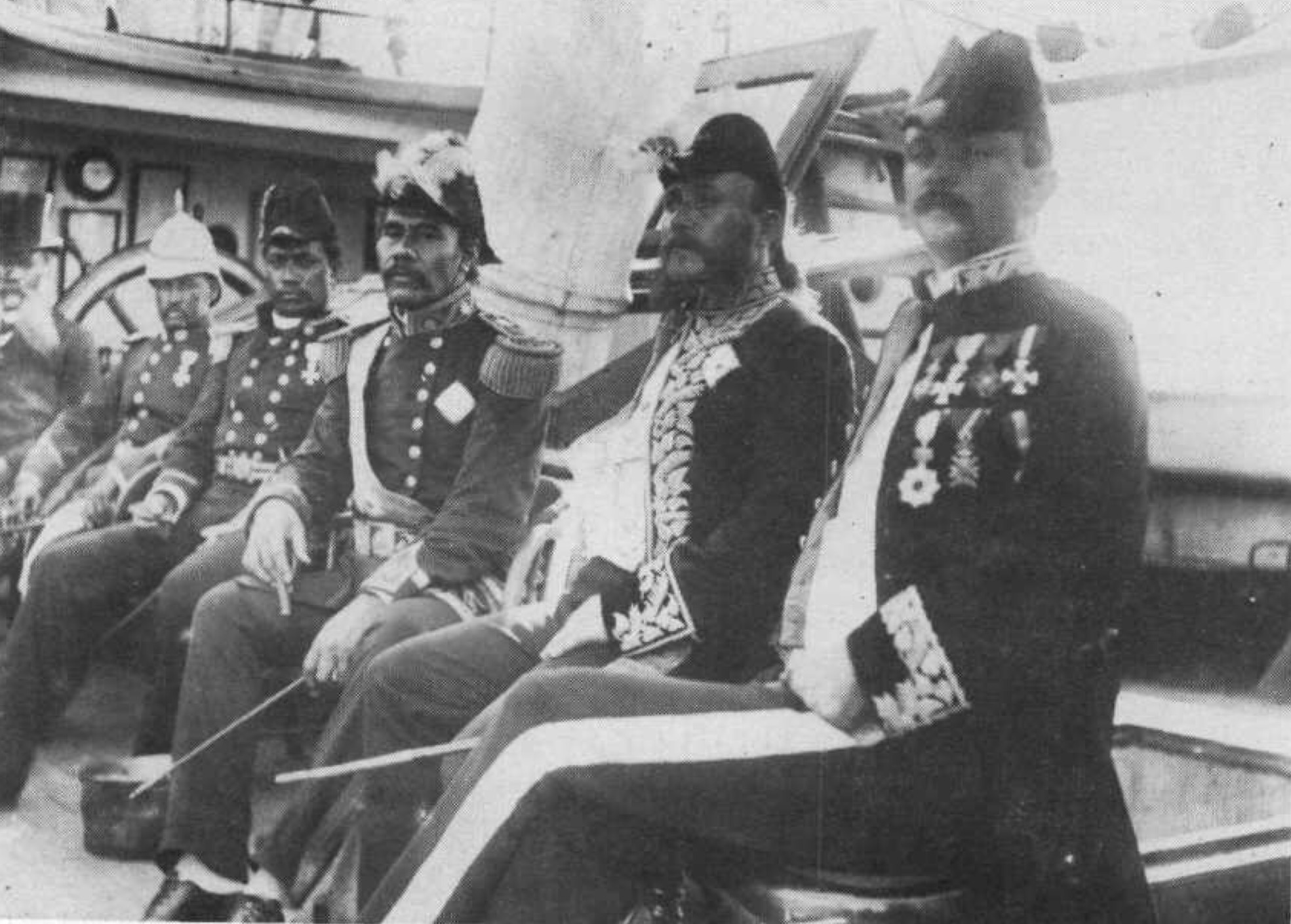
Aboard Kaimiloa, right to left: Henry Poor, John Edward Bush, Malietoa Laupepa

Laupepa received a delegation from King Kalākaua of the Kingdom of Hawaii on January 7, 1887.

It was headed by John Edward Bush, and awarded the honorary decoration Grand Cross of the Royal Order of the Star of Oceania the same day. The order had just been created for the heads of state for the proposed Polynesian empire.

On February 17, 1887, Laupepa signed the Deed of Federation allying his government to that of the Kingdom of Hawaii. The Hawaiians seemed to understand Samoan politics better than the Europeans since they also sought the signatures of the other tamaʻāiga but the Germans prevented Matāʻafa and Tupua Tamasese from attesting the document. Laupepa did not appreciate the rowdiness of the Hawaiian delegation, but he hoped that the Polynesian Confederation would provide more than lip service to the Samoan cause. Support from the Hawaiian Kingdom never materialized and Laupepa was ultimately driven into hiding by the German-backed Sā Tupua army in August. Laupepa and some of his leading chiefs avoided capture for several weeks before turning themselves into the German authorities. German Captain Eugen Brandeis coerced Laupepa and others to formally recognize Titimaea as King of Samoa on September 15, 1887 (Gray 78–79) and then Laupepa was exiled on September 17, 1887. He was taken aboard the German gunboat SMS Adler to Australia, where he was transferred to SMS Albatross, which carried him to the German colony of Kamerun in Africa.

The Germans, along with the Taʻimua and Faipule, declared Tupua Tamasese Titimaea King of Samoa and by August 1888 Tamasese was calling himself both Malietoa and Tafaʻifā. He gravely offended the Malietoa families because he did not in fact hold the Malietoa title. He added further insult by amassing Malietoa family fine-mats for himself. Matāʻafa Iosefo, who was the actual Gatoʻaitele and Tamasoāliʻi, likewise took offense to Tamasese's audacious claim. With Laupepa in exile the Sā Malietoa was divided once again as to who should rightfully represent the Malietoa families. Some believed Tamasese's claim to the Malietoa was legitimate; others felt that Faʻalataitaua (Talavou's son) was the rightful saʻo; others saw Matāʻafa Iosefo as the legitimate contender. Mataʻafa Iosefo [Faifeʻau] eventually came to the forefront of the Malietoa title struggle and he seems to have obtained the Malietoa title in 1888 or 1889.

Matāʻafa – who was supported by Faʻalataitaua and the Sā Talavou faction – managed to reconsolidate the Malietoa allies and led them against Tamasese Titimaea in August 1888. Matāʻafa's people refused to recognize Tamasese as king, especially Manono and Apolima. In mid-September, Matāʻafa's forces drove Tamasese's Ātua forces from Vaiala to Matafagatele (Vaimauga, Tuamasaga) and won the battle around 10 oʻclock at night (Tuvale 45). Malietoa allies from Satupaʻitea on Savaii island, raided and razed Leulumoega, the capital of Aʻana, on September 20 and Matāʻafa's militias burned villages and plantations in Satapuala, Faleasiu, Fasitoʻo Uta, and other areas of Aʻana within a month of the Leulumoega victory. The people of Atua experienced the same fate when the newly refurbished Matāʻafa-Malietoa fleets from Manono and Faʻasaleleaga invaded the coastal villages of Tamasese's allies in Falefā, Faleapuna, Lufilufi and Sāluafata. By February 1889 Matāʻafa's personal army had swelled to about 6,000 warriors.

== Malietoa Laupepa and Mataʻafa Iosefo ==
At first, Germany refused to recognize Mataʻafa Iosefo as ruler even though the Samoans in general recognized him as their king, and a leader of the itūmālō. Instead, Germany, Britain, and the United States signed the General Act of Berlin on June 14, 1889, which declared Laupepa king once again even though he was still in exile (Bevans 118).

When Laupepa returned to Samoa on November 8, 1889, he acknowledged Matāʻafa's right to the title and office which had both been acquired through war and the consent of the people. Peace existed for a time and both men were acknowledged as Malietoa titleholders and national leaders. However Laupepa was soon convinced by his chiefly colleagues to reclaim the kingship which the foreign powers and the Berlin Treaty had allotted him. On December 4, 1889, a fono (traditional council of Samoan leaders) was held in Lepea, Faleata and Laupepa's supporters (including several Tutuila chiefs) declared him King of Samoa. This declaration led to another division of the Sā Malietoa, this time between Laupepa-Sā Mōlī and Matāʻafa-Sā Talavou.

Under Sā Talavou sanction, Matāʻafa challenged Laupepa and the Sā Mōlī by establishing himself in Malie, the traditional government seat of the Malietoa chiefs, on May 31, 1891. Laupepa and his supporters moved in to occupy Mulinuʻu where Laupepa's government had been headquartered. Latter-day Saint missionary journals reveal that support from eastern ʻUpolu (Ātua) had rallied behind Matāʻafa (who was by this time the Tuiātua) in Malie and hundreds were arriving to offer their assistance. A similar show of support for Laupepa was witnessed on October 28, 1892 when “a hundred boats” arrived at Mulinuʻu bearing military support and provisions. Malietoa Laupepa eventually succeeded in ousting Matāʻafa from Malie toward the end of April 1893. Matāʻafa then “set up house” in Manono where he was designated “Tama Sā” through the title Toʻoā, not to be confused with the Saʻoʻaualuma title of the Malietoa (Tamasese 1995b:71).

The subsequent War of 1893 was won by Malietoa Laupepa in July of that year and Matāʻafa and other notable leaders were deported to Jaluit, Marshall Islands on July 26 of that year (Keesing 1934:72). Even though Matāʻafa had been deported, the factions that favored him over Laupepa continued in their opposition of King Laupepa. Malietoa Faʻalataitaua assumed full leadership of the Sā Talavou in the absence of his ally, Matāʻafa. Matāʻafa's sanction as Malietoa was “washed out” through a desanctification ritual and the title then fell into dispute between the Sā Talavou (behind Malietoa Faʻalataitaua) and the Sā Moli (led by Malietoa Laupepa).

Charles Morris Woodford was Acting British Consul and Deputy Commissioner in Apia from December 1894 to September 1895. His goal was for Samoa to be annexed by Great Britain, although the American Consul, J. A. Mulligan, was supporting Tupua Tamasese Lealofio-aʻana (Tupua Tamasese Lealofi I). Woodford arranged a reconciliation meeting between Laupepa and Lealofi-o-aʻana in 1895.

Malietoa Laupepa – Tamasoāliʻi and Gatoʻaitele – died at 10 o'clock in the morning of August 22, 1898 and was succeeded by his son Malietoa Tanumafili I. The situation in Samoa further deteriorated after the death of Laupepa, which led to the Second Samoan Civil War.

== Family tree ==
Malietoa family tree

Malietoa Vai’inupo
Malietoa Mōli I	Malietoa; Talavou Tonumaipeʻa
Malietoa Laupepa	Malietoa Faʻalataitaua
Malietoa Tanumafili I
Malietoa Tanumafili II
Malietoa Mōli II	Papaliʻi Laupepa

Notes:
- Morgan A. Tuimalealiʻifano (2006). O tama a ʻāiga: the politics of succession to Sāmoa's paramount titles. editorips@usp.ac.fj. p. 52. ISBN 9820203775.

Preceded by Malietoa Talavou Tonumaipeʻa	Malietoa of Samoa; 1880s and 1890s	Succeeded by Malietoa Tanumafili I
