= Malietoa Tanumafili I =

- Malietoa; King (Tafa'ifa) of Samoa
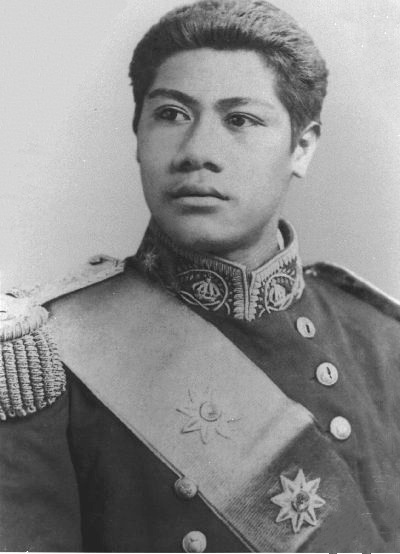

King of Samoa
- Reign: 1898 – 2 December 1899
- Coronation: 31 December, 1898
- Predecessor: Malietoa Laupepa
- Successor: Monarchy abolished

Malietoa
- Reign: 1898 - 5 July 1939
- Predecessor: Malietoa Laupepa
- Successor: Malietoa Tanumafili II
- Born: 1879; Samoa
- Died: 5 July 1939 (aged 59–60); Faatoialemanu, Samoa
- Spouse: Momoe Lupeuluiva Meleisea
- Issue: Sisavai‘i Lupeuluiva; Vaimo‘o‘a; Salamāsina; Malietoa Tanumafili II; Sāvea‘ali‘i Ioane Viliamu
- Father: Malietoa Laupepa
- Mother: Sisavai'i Malupo Niuva'ai

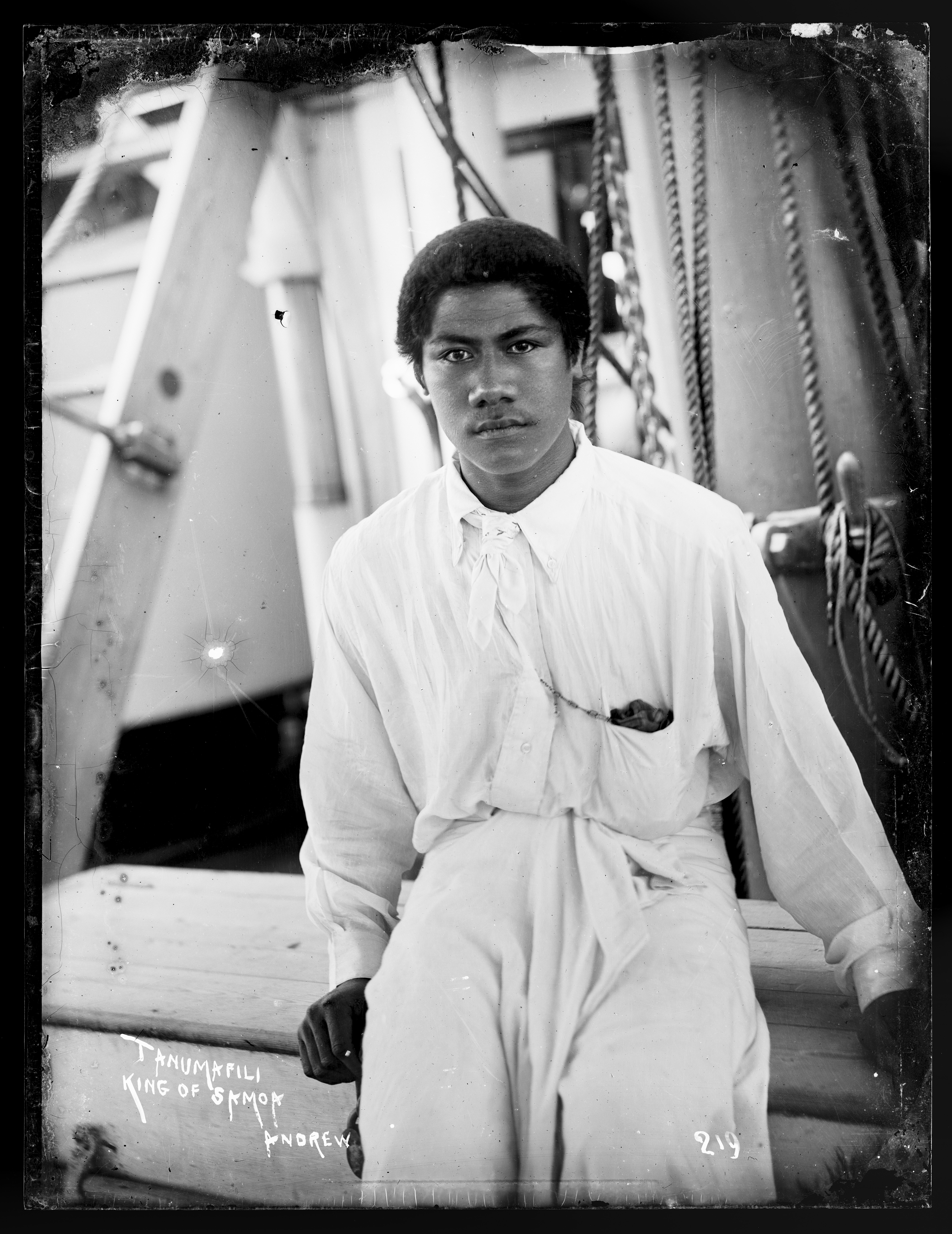
Tanumafili aboard a British naval ship.

Susuga Malietoa Tanumafili I OBE (1879 – 5 July 1939) was the Malietoa in Samoa from 1898 until his death in 1939. After the death of his father, Malietoa Laupepa, who was recognized as king of Samoa by many Western countries, Tanumafili was immediately crowned, with Tupua Tamasese Lealofi I serving as vice-king. Tanumafili was backed by the United States and United Kingdom, however Germany supported rebel chief Mata‘afa Iosefo who was eyeing the throne. The battle between the two made up the Second Samoan Civil War and in the end caused the Tripartite Convention that split the islands. After the war, Malietoa pursued education in Fiji and then came back to Samoa, where he was appointed as an advisor.

== Personal and political life ==
Tanumafili was born in 1880 to Malietoa Laupepa and Sisavai‘i Malupo Niuva‘ai. He attended the London Missionary College in Malua, before continuing his education in Fiji.

He married Momoe Lupeuluiva Meleiseā and had five children: Sisavai‘i Lupeuluiva, Vaimo‘oi‘a, Salamāsina, Tanumafili II, and Sāvea‘ali‘i Ioane Viliamu.

When his father died in 1898, Tanumafili was declared "King of Samoa" (Tafaʻifa) by William Lea Chambers, and recognised by Germany, the United Kingdom and United States. However, this led to the outbreak of the Second Samoan Civil War.

The vast majority of Samoa rallied behind the Matā‘afa-Sā Talavou party, including the Germans, the Tumua of Ātua-A‘ana, the Pule of Savai‘i (Keesing 1934:73), ‘Aiga-i-le-Tai, and most of Tuamasaga. Once again socio-religious factors came into play as the Sā Mōlī’s support came from the L.M.S. Tanumafili's royal house was made up of four families: Matavai, Silliaumua, Tupuola and Fagafua, the last remaining dynasty in the western part of Samoa. They were Congregationalists, while most other Samoan Christians backed the Sā Talavou-Sā Natūitasina-Matā‘afa parties. Perhaps the most adamant and well-known opponent of Tanumafili’s claim was Lauaki Namulau‘ulu Mamoe of Sāfotulafai, Savaiʻi, a famed orator who carried the Tongan matapule title Lauaki (Gifford 149). He argued that not only was Tanumafili too young and inexperienced to rule, but that his installment as Malietoa was illegitimate and invalid according to Samoan custom. The vast majority of Samoans, including the leading orator bodies of Ātua-A‘ana (Tumua), Savai‘i (Pule), Manono, and Tuamasaga (Auimatagi) attested to the invalidity of Tanumafili’s claims to the kingship and the Malietoa title but the foreign powers continued in their endorsement of Malietoa Tanumafili I. A joint session of the Pule and Tumua assemblies held fono in Leulumoega, A‘ana and declared Matā‘afa Iosefo "King of Samoa" on 12 November 1898; this pronouncement was ratified at a national council held on 15 November at Mulinu‘u.

== Foreign intervention and native opinion ==
The British and American consuls defied this declaration (as did Tanumafili I and Lealofi I) and their naval ships and soldiers assisted in defeating Matā‘afa Iosefo as the year 1898 came to a close; Tanumafili I was declared King of Samoa on 31 December. The Tumua communities joined with the Sā Talavou and Matā‘afa parties in immediately protesting Tanumafili's appointment, prompting the One Day War in which Tanumafili and Tamasese allies were defeated on 1 January 1899. Fearing for their lives, King Tanumafili I and Vice-King Tamasese Lealofi boarded a British ship where they lived for over two months to avoid assassination attempts. The Germans then declared Matā‘afa the "head of all chiefs" while the British and the American consuls nominated Tanumafili as the ruler of Samoa (Hart, Hart & Harris 105). Matā‘afa's parties declared him king once again in January, while "all the High Chiefs of Malietoa" Laupepa were in exile in Tutuila and Malietoa Laupepa himself remained under the protection of the British; there was no military opposition to the coronation that day.

Tanumafili's high chiefs were allowed to return from Tutuila in March 1899 and war parties were reorganized. Tanumafili was able to defeat Matā‘afa with the ammunition and military aid of the Americans and British, and the foreign consuls once again named Tanumafili as King of Samoa on 23 March.

Foreign political influences by this time had become deeply ingrained in the Samoan struggle for leadership. A committee composed of the foreign consuls called together the leaders of both parties on 20 May 1899. Matā‘afa Iosefo, Malietoa Fa‘alata and Lauaki Namulau‘ulu Mamoe are mentioned as high-ranking spokesmen of the Matā‘afa-Sā Talavou bloc while Tupua Tamasese Titimaea and Malietoa Laupepa headed the Tamasese-Sā Mōlī delegation. The joint commission of Germany, the United States and Great Britain abolished the Samoan kingship in June 1899 and placed Manu‘a and Tutuila under American control while Germany received ‘Upolu, Savaii, Manono, and Apolima. The official tri-nation "adjustment of jurisdiction" was signed in Washington, D.C., on 7 November without any mention of Samoan consent or opinion; no Samoan chiefs signed the convention nor is there explicit indication that the Samoans were even aware of the impending dissection of their island group. Under this new government Matā‘afa Iosefo was named Ali‘i Sili ("Paramount Chief") of Samoa while the German Kaiser was declared Tupu Sili ("Paramount King") of Samoa. The young Tanumafili – no longer King of Samoa – then left for the British Fijian islands to further his university education.

== Tanumafili I and German administration ==
The Kaiser sent Dr. Wilhelm Solf to govern German Samoa in March 1900. Solf seemed to be supportive (or at least cognizant) of the native political system that previous European consuls had blatantly disregarded. In 1901 he oversaw a massive distribution of 2,000 fine state-mats (‘ie o le mālō) which served to acknowledge the authority of traditional chiefs while demonstrating a level of cultural sensitivity on the part of the German Empire (Keesing 1934:84). The ceremonial distribution took several months to complete and not all Samoan parties were satisfied with the recognition they received and/or the fact that the German administration oversaw the distribution. Other Samoan chiefs were upset over a perceived "attitude" adjustment of their paramounts; in 1901, Matā‘afa announced:

... the old days of Tumua and Pule are past, whose regimes have been absolutely guided by the laws and customs of Samoa. But now at the present time I wish to openly proclaim throughout our islands, that the honourable position of Le Ali‘i Sili which I hold was received through His Majesty the Kaiser – the Great King (Tupu Sili).

Similarly, Malietoa Tanumafili disappointed many of his followers when he refused to accept the kingly ‘ava (also known as kava) and instead passed on his "rights and privileges" to the German government. In January 1903, having arrived from Fiji, he declared:

let us all obey and honour His Excellency the Governor, with him is the pule atoa ("total power"). The respect and honour which Malietoa possessed in days gone by now belong to our Sovereign the Kaiser.... The words to which Samoa was accustomed ‘Let Samoa obey Malietoa’ has now ended....(86)

Solf and the German imperial officers came to confide in Matā‘afa Iosefo and endorsed him as the legitimate leader of the itū mālō. Matā‘afa's actions later in his term, however, reveal that his declared obeisance to Germany was probably a front for underlying motives and sentiments (the type of togafiti deception that Solf frequently condemned). In order to maintain the peace among "those who had not been recognised, but who had, in genealogical and recent historical terms, equal rank," Solf also allowed for the appointment of other paramount tama‘aiga to government offices (Meleiseā 1987b:50). This representation was accomplished by installing the acknowledged heads of the Sā Tupua and the Sā Malietoa as "Ta‘imua." The office of Ta‘imua was an executive and advisory position first held by Tupua Tamasese Lealofi I of the Sā Tupua and Malietoa Fa‘alataitaua of the Sā Malietoa Talavou.

== Tanumafili I and the New Zealand Government ==
Tanumafili returned to Samoa and began reasserting his claim to the Malietoa title only after Malietoa Fa‘alataitaua had died (Tamasese 1995b:75). Hostilities arose between Tanumafili's Sā Mōlī, the Sā Talavou parties, and Matā‘afa Iosefo over rights to the Malietoa title. Tensions were so high that Malietoa Fa‘alata's sons needed to be safeguarded against rivals who wished to eliminate potential claimants. When Matā‘afa Iosefo died on 6 February 1912, he took the office of Ali‘i Sili to his grave and Malietoa Tanumafili regained support as Fautua and the sole Malietoa. It is probably in this year that Tanumafili also received the Tamasoāli‘i and Gato‘aitele supposedly carried by the Matā‘afa until 1912.

New Zealand’s Lieutenant-Colonel Logan elicited the German surrender of the western Samoan islands in 1914 and began reorganizing Samoa’s government. New Zealand assured the Samoan people that the new government would be for Samoa’s benefit, unlike the German regime which was instated at great cost to Samoan autonomy and traditional authority. After opening Samoa’s first banking institution and deporting most German citizens, the New Zealand administration appointed Malietoa Tanumafili and Tupua Tamasese Lealofi I as joint Fautua. After Tupua Tamasese Lealofi’s death on 13 October 1915, Tanumafili served as Fautua along with Tuimaleali‘ifano Si‘u.

Under New Zealand occupation many Samoans began acting on their desires for self-autonomy. Many Samoan customs which had been suppressed under German rule, such as ceremonial ‘ie toga exchanges and kilikiti matches, returned to normal function. Local chiefs were also at liberty "to make rules in the best interests of the village" and village fono began retaking administrative powers lost to the Germans (Meleiseā 1987a:112). Tanumafili had been a founding member of Apia's so-called Toe‘aina Club which provided high-ranking Samoan chiefs a venue for socialization and collaboration. The club also gave Samoans a place to resolve conflicts involving titles or property without requiring New Zealand’s interference.

On 17 December 1920 the League of Nations granted British-New Zealand mandate over "German Samoa" and King George V of the United Kingdom became the titular King of Samoa. Sir George Richardson's administration was widely opposed and by 1927 the leaders of the four Samoan royal families, or tama‘aiga, were divided in their opinions about New Zealand rule. Matā‘afa Salanoa and Malietoa Tanumafili appeared to be loyal – "at least in public" – to the New Zealand administration (Meleiseā 1987b:142) while Tupua Tamasese Lealofi III and Tuimaleali‘ifano Si‘u supported the Samoan independence movement known as the Mau. The Mau grew out of discontent with Richardson's policies and growing distrust of foreign intervention in Samoan affairs. The Mau was a nonviolent movement devoted to civil disobedience but it was opposed by some Samoans, specifically those allied to the Malietoa families and villages, among them Vaimauga (Tuamasaga), Aleipata (Ātua) and Falealili (Ātua). In March 1928, Malietoa supporters around Apia took offense to the anti-government rallies conducted by a particular Mau group from Savaii and had it not been for Tanumafili's intervention a tragic massacre probably would have taken place. The Malietoa factions did not oppose the Mau because they desired to be ruled by New Zealand. Like all Samoans they longed for independence too, but the "non-Mau Samoans" (Meleiseā 1987b:145) were convinced that the Mau's opposition of New Zealand was a direct challenge to Malietoa authority since Tanumafili was Fautua of the foreign government.

Tanumafili was appointed to the Legislative Council in 1929, and was appointed an honorary Officer of the Order of the British Empire, for services to the New Zealand government, in the 1931 New Year Honours. Following moves towards self-government he resigned from the Legislative Council in 1937 to allow the new Fono to select someone else.

He died in 1939 after 41 years as Malietoa.

== Family tree ==
Malietoa family tree

Malietoa Vai’inupo
Malietoa Mōli I	Malietoa; Talavou Tonumaipeʻa
Malietoa Laupepa	Malietoa Faʻalataitaua
Malietoa Tanumafili I
Malietoa Tanumafili II
Malietoa Mōli II	Papaliʻi Laupepa

Notes:
- Morgan A. Tuimalealiʻifano (2006). O tama a ʻāiga: the politics of succession to Sāmoa's paramount titles. editorips@usp.ac.fj. p. 52. ISBN 9820203775.

Preceded by Malietoa Laupepa	Malietoa; 1898–1939	Succeeded by Malietoa Tanumafili II
