= Kingdom of Samoa =

Kingdom in the Samoan Islands, 1873–1899

Kingdom of Samoa Malo o Samoa (Samoan)
- 1873–1900
- Flag (1879–1900) Coat of arms (1879–1900)
- Motto: Le Faa Moemoe Lelei
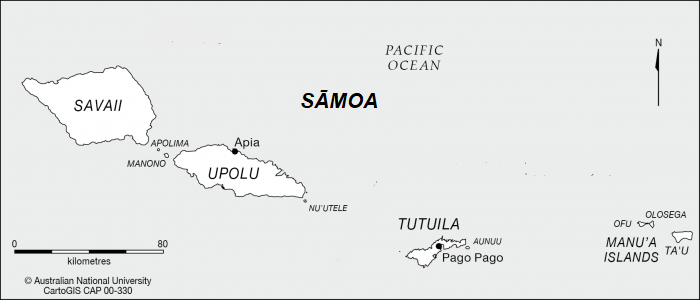
- Capital: Mulinu'u (1873-1887); Leulumoega 1880-1881 (Taimua and Faipule); Leulumoega (1887-1888); Mulinu'u (1889-1899); Aele (1899) (Mata'afa Iosefo); Mulinu'u (1899) (Malietoa Tanumafili)
- Common languages: Samoan
- Demonym: Samoan
- Government: Confederal constitutional monarchy (Note: Kingdom of Samoa was composed out of 11 districts, each district had its own sovereign, and its own parliament.)
- King
  - 1873-1875: Tupua Pulepule and Malietoa Laupepa
  - 1875-1876: Malietoa Laupepa
  - 1877-1879: Tupua Tamasese Titimaea
  - 1879-1880: Malietoa Talavou
  - 1880-81: Tupua Tamasese Titimaea (On the side of Taimua and Faipule)
  - 1881-1887: Malietoa Laupepa
  - 1887-1889: Tupua Tamasese Titimaea (as king)
  - 1888-1893: Mata'afa Iosefo (as king) (in war with Tupua, later Malietoa)
  - 1890-1898: Malietoa Laupepa
  - 1898-1899: Mata'afa Iosefo
  - 1899-1899: Malietoa Tanumafili (installed by Americans, in opposition to Mata'afa)

Establishment
  - Kingdom founded: 1873
  - Second Constitution adopted: 1875
  - War between Pulefou and Taimua and Faipule: 1879-1881
  - First Samoan Civil War: 1889-1894
  - Second Samoan Civil War: 1898-1899
  - Tripartite Convention: December 1899
  - German rule declared: March 1900
  - Taimua and Faipule abolished: 1905
Preceded by	Succeeded by
Faitasiga (Confederacy, Malietoa Talavou); Faitasiga (Union, Malietoa Laupepa)	German Samoa; American Samoa

The Kingdom of Samoa, or Samoan Kingdom, was a pre-colonial Polynesian monarchy that existed from 1873 to 1899 in the Samoan Islands of Polynesia. The monarchy of Samoa was abolished under the Tripartite Convention of 1899, effective 16 February 1900.

== Background and History ==
European and Tahitian and Cook Islander missionaries and traders, led by Rev. John Williams began arriving around 1830. Coming via Tahiti, they were known in Samoa as the Lotu Taiti. Williams was aided by Ali'i Malietoa Vainu'upo to establish the London Missionary Society locally, and its missionaries brought Tahitian converts to share their acceptance of the new religion. This Christian endeavor laid the foundation of the Congregational Christian Church of Samoa.

The United States Exploring Expedition (1838–42) under Charles Wilkes reached Samoa in 1839 and appointed an Englishman, John C. Williams, son of the missionary, as acting U.S. consul. However this appointment was never confirmed by the U.S. State Department; John C. Williams was merely recognized as "Commercial Agent of the United States". A British consul was already resident in Apia.

In 1855, J.C. Godeffroy & Sohn expanded its trading business into the Samoan Islands, which were then known as the Navigator Islands. During the second half of the 19th century German influence in Samoa expanded with large plantation operations being introduced for coconut, cacao and hevea rubber cultivation, especially on the island of 'Upolu where German firms monopolized copra and cocoa bean processing. British business enterprises, harbour rights, and consulate office were the basis on which Britain had cause to intervene in Samoa. The United States Navy began operations at the harbor of Pago Pago on Tutuila in 1877 and formed alliances with native chieftains, most conspicuously on the islands of Tutuila and Aunu'u. On April 17, 1900, the United States flag was raised on Sogelau Hill in the village of Fagatogo. Thus, Eastern Samoa became the U.S. Territory of American Samoa. The Kingdom of Manu'a later joined American Samoa in 1904.

In the 1880s, Great Britain, Germany and the United States all claimed parts of Samoa, and established trade posts. The rivalry between these powers exacerbated tensions between the indigenous factions, which were all jockeying for complete political authority. The islands were divided among the three powers in the 1890s, and partitioned between the United States and Germany in 1899.

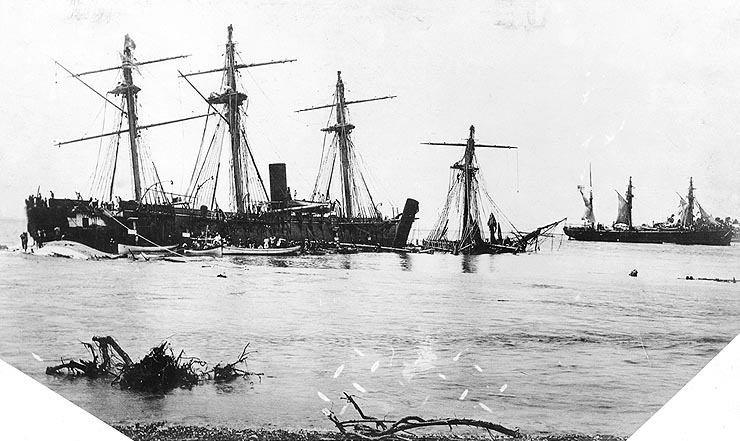
Wrecked vessels at Apia (1889)

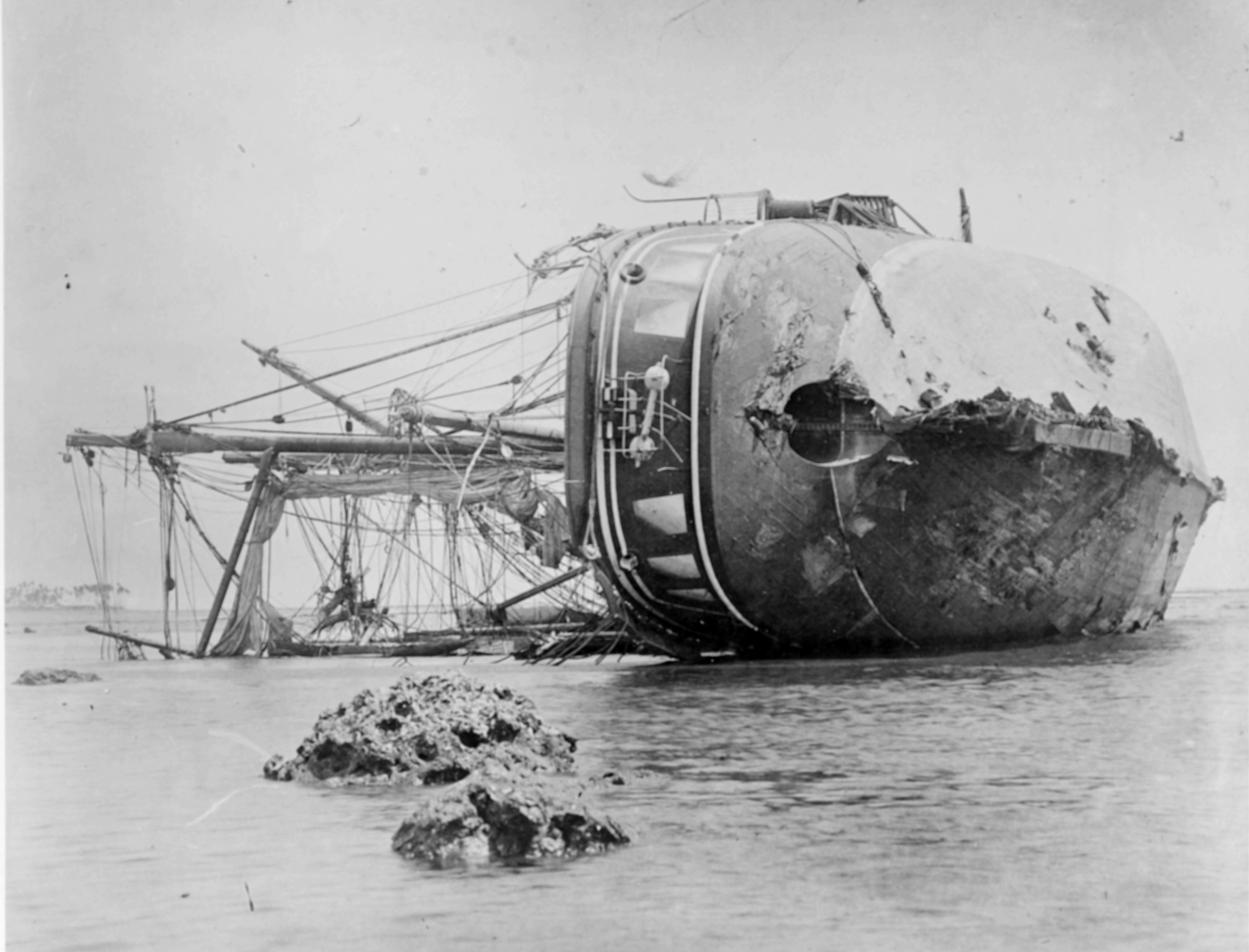
SMS Adler wrecked at Apia (1889)

=== First Civil War and crisis ===
The First Samoan Civil War was fought roughly between 1886 and 1894, primarily between rival Samoan factions, although the rival powers intervened on several occasions with military forces. Each of the three powers, Britain, Germany, and the United States, supplied arms, training, and in some cases, combat troops to the warring Samoan parties. The Samoan crisis came to a critical juncture in March 1889 when all three Western contenders sent warships into Apia harbour, and a larger-scale war seemed imminent, until a massive storm on 15 March 1889 damaged or destroyed the warships, ending the military conflict.

Robert Louis Stevenson arrived in Samoa in 1889 and built a house at Vailima. He quickly became passionately involved in the attendant political machinations. His influence spread to the Samoans, who consulted him for advice, and he soon became involved in local politics. These involved the three great powers battling for control of Samoa - America, Germany and Britain - and the indigenous factions which were all jockeying for complete political authority. He was convinced that the European officials appointed to rule the Samoans were incompetent, and after many futile attempts to resolve the matter, he published A Footnote to History. The book covers the period from 1882 to 1892. This was such a stinging protest against existing conditions that it resulted in the recall of two officials, and Stevenson feared for a time it would result in his own deportation.

=== Second Civil War ===
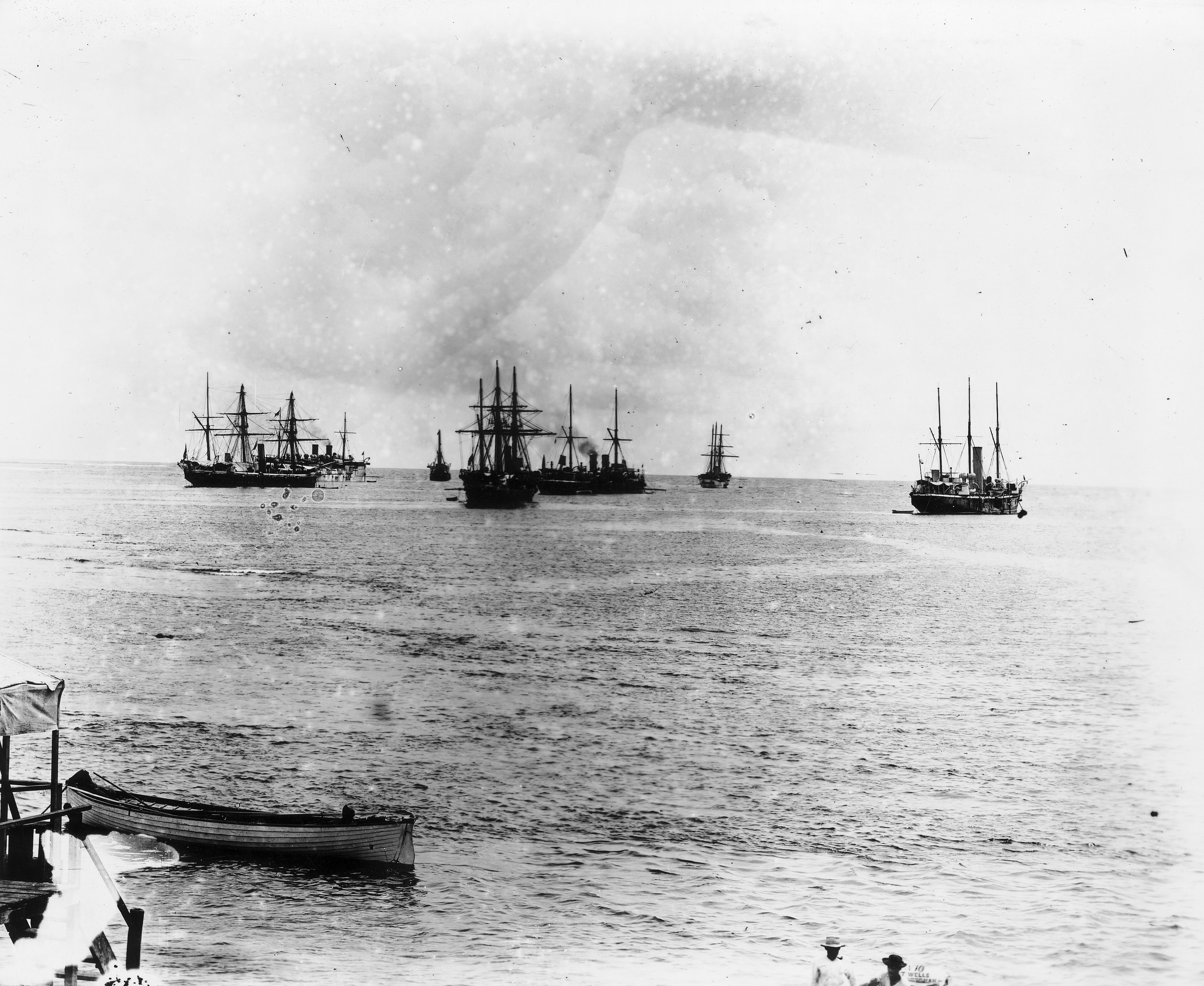
German, British and American warships in Apia harbour, 1899 (Alfred James Tattersall)

The Second Samoan Civil War reached a head in 1898 when Germany, Great Britain and the United States disputed over who should control the Samoan Islands.

The Battle of Apia occurred in March 1899. Samoan forces loyal to Tanumafili were besieged by a larger force of Samoan rebels loyal to powerful chief Mata'afa Iosefo. Supporting Prince Tanu were landing parties from four British and American warships. Over several days of fighting, the Samoan rebels were defeated.

American and British warships shelled Apia on 15 March 1899; including the USS Philadelphia. Following the initial defeat at Apia, Mata'afa's rebels defeated a combined American, British and Tanu allied force at Vailele on 1 April 1899, with the allies in retreat. According to a war correspondent associated with the Auckland Star newspaper, the aftermath saw Mata'afa's warriors leaving decapitated American and British corpses on the field. Germany, Britain and the United States quickly resolved to end the hostilities by partitioning the island chain at the Tripartite Convention of 1899. With Tanumafili and his American and British allies' unable to defeat him in war, Mata'afa was promoted to Ali'i Si'i, or high chief of Samoa.
