= Momoe Malietoa Von Reiche =

Samoan poet

Momoe Malietoa Von Reiche is a Samoan poet, artist, sculptor, photographer.

== Biography ==
She was born in Samoa and was educated in Samoa and New Zealand. Her published books of poetry are Solaua, a Secret Embryo (1974), Pao Alimago on Wet Days (1979), Alaoa, above the Gully of Your Childhood (1986) and Tai, the Heart of a Tree (1989).

Von Reiche writes in English. She belongs to the "later phase" of South Pacific poetry, whereby her perception of reality is through an individual rather than communal viewpoint. Her poems have been described as "lyrical". A prominent theme in her poetry is the sexist abuse of power. Literary critic Tiffin has noted the use of "words deliberate, carefully chosen, hard hitting" in such poems of hers. Personal relationships are another recurrent theme in her works, and a quest for love and belonging features. Critics have noted some "autobiographical" elements in her poetry, with several of her poems being described as "vignettes which capture transitory moments of tenderness, compassion, jealousy and anger".

She runs an art gallery named M.A.D.D. in Moto'otua. Here, she organises dance and drama programmes, as well as creative writing programmes for children. She also illustrates children's books. She has organised creative writing workshops in Tokelau under the University of South Pacific, inspiring young Tokelauan writers, most of them women. These workshops led to the publication of a collection of works from nine Tokelauans in 1992, titled Nuanua in Tokelau.
