= Malietoa Tanumafili II =

O le Ao o le Malo of Samoa from 1962 to 2007

His Highness Susuga Malietoa Tanumafili II GCMG CBE
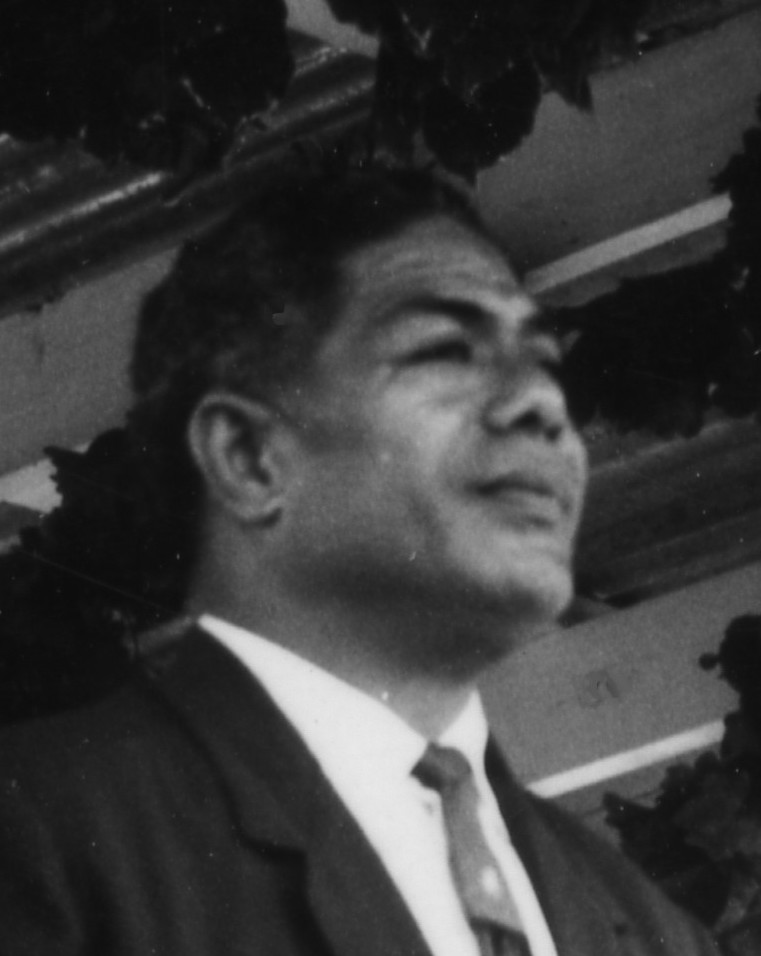
- Tanumafili in 1962

O le Ao o le Malo of Samoa
- In office 1 January 1962 – 11 May 2007 Serving with Tupua Tamasese Meaʻole until 5 April 1963
- Prime Minister: See list: Fiame Mataʻafa Faumuina Mulinuʻu II Tupua Tamasese Lealofi IV Tupuola Efi Vaʻai Kolone Tofilau Eti Alesana Tuilaʻepa Saʻilele Malielegaoi
- Preceded by: Office established
- Succeeded by: Tui Ātua Tupua Tamasese Efi

Malietoa
- Tenure: c. 1940 – 11 May 2007
- Predecessor: Malietoa Tanumafili I
- Successor: Malietoa Mōli II
- Born: 4 January 1913; German Samoa
- Died: 11 May 2007 (aged 94); Motoʻotua, Samoa
- Burial: 18 May 2007; Mulinuʻu, Samoa
- Spouse: Le Afioga i le Masiofo, Lili Tunu (m. 1940; died 1986)
- Issue: Malietoa Mōli II; Papaliʻi Laupepa; Momoe Malietoa Von Reiche
- Father: Malietoa Tanumafili I
- Mother: Momoe Lupeuluiva Meleisea

Malietoa Tanumafili II GCMG CBE (4 January 1913 – 11 May 2007) was O le Ao o le Malo (head of state) of Samoa from its independence in 1962 until his death in 2007. He was bestowed with the Malietoa title in 1940 and had previously worked for the New Zealand administration as a civil servant and parliamentarian. As head of state, he initially served jointly with Tupua Tamasese Meaʻole, who died in April 1963.

== Early life ==
Tanumafili was born on 4 January 1913 (Note: In 2007, the government opted to celebrate his 95th birthday, rather than his 94th, saying it had obtained recorded evidence which instead gave his year of birth as 1912.) as the third child of Malietoa Tanumafili I and Momoe Lupeuluiva Meleisea. He was educated at the government-run Leififi School in Samoa and went on to enroll at St. Stephen's School and Wesley College in Pukekohe, both of which are in New Zealand.

After his father's death, he returned to Samoa and was conferred with the title of Malietoa in October 1939. The Lands and Titles Court ruled in his favour in February 1940 when an extended relative disputed his claim to the title. The Malietoa is one of four maximal lineage tamaʻāiga titles, the others being Tupua Tamasese, Mataʻafa and Tuimalealiʻifano.

== Early public career ==
Soon after becoming Malietoa, he was appointed a special adviser (fautua) to the New Zealand administration over Samoa. Malietoa was part of a Western Samoan delegation welcoming Queen Elizabeth II to New Zealand in 1953. During his earlier career, he worked for several years alongside Tupua Tamasese Meaʻole, serving in multiple conventions related to constitutional reform as part of the transition to independence. Both were also members of the Legislative Assembly before their resignation in 1957. In 1959, Malietoa was appointed joint chairman of a working committee which advised New Zealand lawyers on drafting the Samoan constitution.

== O le Ao o le Malo (1962–2007) ==
Upon Samoa's independence in 1962, Malietoa and Tupua Tamasese became O Ao o le Malo, the heads of state of Samoa jointly designated under the constitution for a life tenure, granted as an exception to the office's usual term length of five years in recognition of their prior public service. Notwithstanding this selection, Malietoa was the country's sole head of state for much of his tenure, following Meaʻole's death in 1963.

Malietoa travelled extensively as O le Ao o le Malo. He conducted state visits to the People's Republic of China in September 1976 and to Australia in April 1978. He also visited Fiji, Tonga, Nauru, Hawaii, Japan, New Zealand, South Korea, the United Kingdom, and West Germany. He was among the foreign dignitaries who attended the 1984 Summer Olympics in Los Angeles and the funeral of Japanese Emperor Shōwa in 1989. He was a frequent guest at the birthday celebrations of Tonga's King Tāufaʻāhau Tupou IV and Flag Day celebrations in American Samoa.

In 1999, amid the fallout from the murder of a reformist politician and cabinet minister, Luagalau Levaula Kamu, Malietoa commuted the death sentences which were handed out to the two perpetrators to life imprisonment, and reportedly also visited them in prison. On 9 August 2004, he bestowed the chiefly Seiuli title upon professional wrestler and actor Dwayne Johnson, when the latter visited Samoa with his mother Ata Maivia.

== Death ==
Malietoa died at the age of 94 on 11 May 2007 after being treated for pneumonia, and was buried on 18 May. His death triggered the first election for an O le Ao o le Malo in Samoa's post-independence history as required by the constitution.

== Honours and legacy ==
In 1953, Malietoa was awarded the Queen Elizabeth II Coronation Medal. He was appointed a Commander of the Order of the British Empire in 1959. In 1977, Elizabeth II visited Samoa for a single day as part of her tour of the South Pacific on board the Royal Yacht Britannia. While in Samoa, she presented Malietoa with the Collar Badge and Star of a Knight Grand Cross of the Order of St Michael and St George. Malietoa was appointed to the Medal of the Grand Order of Samoa on 3 January 2001.

Malietoa is often credited for providing much of the stability that Samoa has enjoyed post independence.

== Personal life ==
Malietoa was an active athlete during his younger years. His favourite sports included boxing, rugby and cricket. Malietoa's interest in sports continued throughout his life and he was an avid golfer well into his nineties. He could often be seen driving his golf cart around Samoa.

In 1973, he converted to the Baháʼí Faith. He was the first serving head of state to be a member of the religion. In 1976, he visited the graveside of Shoghi Effendi, first and last Guardian of the Baháʼí Administrative Order, in London. In 1979 he laid the foundational cornerstone of the Baháʼí House of Worship in Tiapapata, eight kilometres from the capital of Apia. The temple was subsequently dedicated by him at completion in 1984. While still adhering to the Baháʼí Faith, Malietoa continued to acknowledge the Christian tradition within his family dating back to 1830.

Malietoa married twice, first to Lili Tunu in 1940, and to Tiresa Patu Tauvela Hunter in 1962. His first wife died in 1986. He had eleven children, including Papaliʻi Laupepa, Malietoa Mōli II and Papaliʻi Momoe Von Reiche, of whom two sons and two daughters survived him at his death.

== Family tree ==
Malietoa family tree

Malietoa Vai’inupo
Malietoa Mōli I | Malietoa; Talavou Tonumaipeʻa
Malietoa Laupepa | Malietoa Faʻalataitaua
Malietoa Tanumafili I
Malietoa Tanumafili II
Malietoa Mōli II | Papaliʻi Laupepa

Notes:
- Morgan A. Tuimalealiʻifano (2006). O tama a ʻāiga: the politics of succession to Sāmoa's paramount titles. editorips@usp.ac.fj. p. 52. ISBN 9820203775.

== Notes ==
Political offices
| Office established | O le Ao o le Malo of Samoa; 1962–2007; Served alongside: Tupua Tamasese Meaʻole (until 1963) | Succeeded by Tui Ātua Tupua Tamasese Efi |
Regnal titles
| Preceded by Malietoa Tanumafili I | Malietoa; 1940–2007 | Succeeded by Malietoa Mōli II |
