= Malietoa Mōli I =

Former ruler of Samoa

- Sā Malietoa
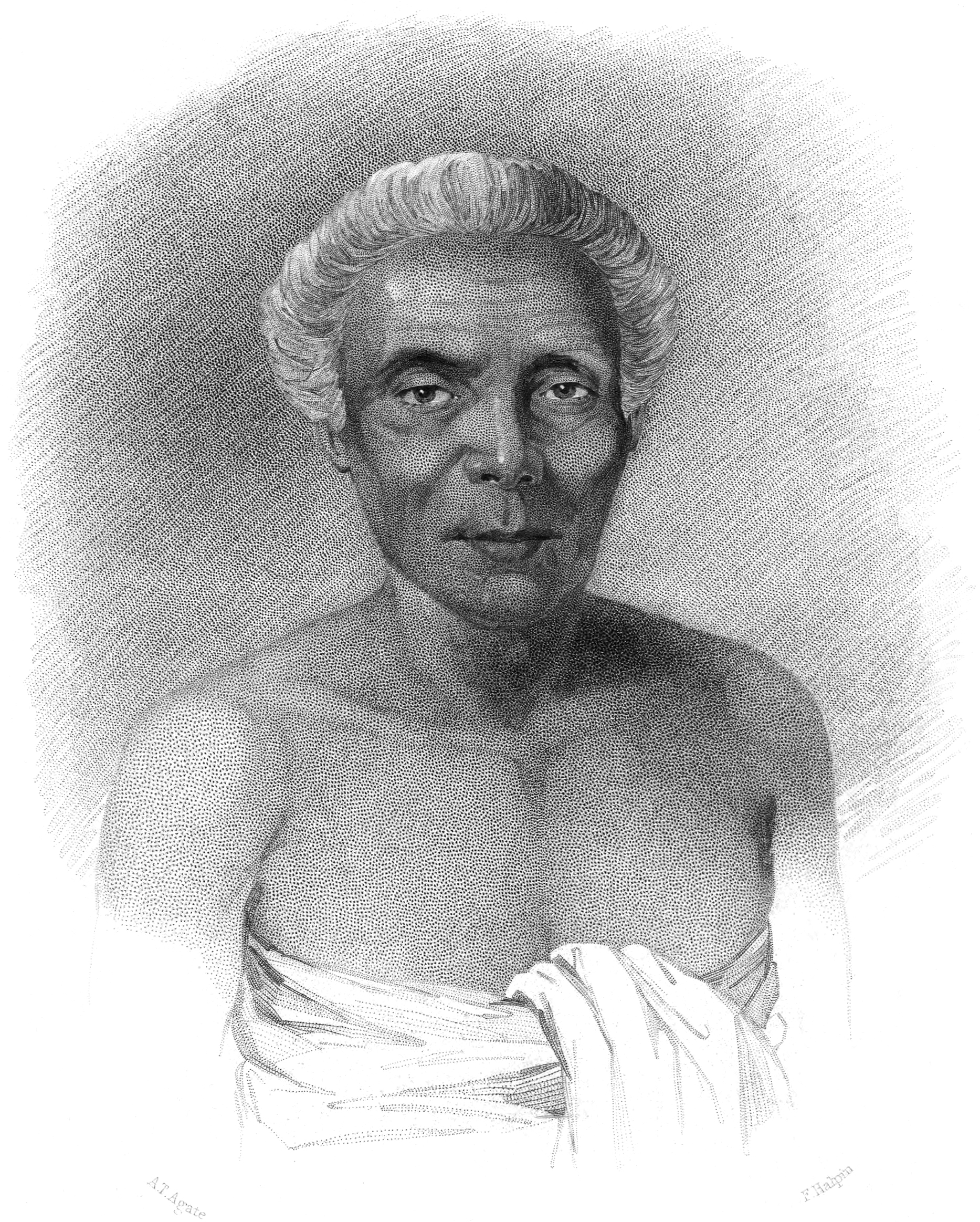

King of Samoa
- Reign: 1858 – 1860
- Predecessor: Malietoa Natuitasina
- Successor: Malietoa Laupepa (his son) & Malietoa Talavou Tonumaipe’a (his half brother, when M. Talavou died M. Laupepa was appointed kingship again)
- Born: c. 1790; Sapapali’i, Savai’i, Samoa
- Died: 1860; Samoa
- Burial: Malie, Upolu, Samoa
- Spouse: Fa’alaitaua Fuatino Su’apa’ia
- Father: Malietoa Vai’inupo Tavita
- Mother: Aunofo Siuli Atuilagi

Malietoa Mōli I [Semoanaifea] (“Lamp Oil” or “Illumination”) was a Samoan king who died in 1860.

== Titular succession ==
Some speculate that both Mōlī and Malietoa Talavou Tonumaipe'a were both declared Malietoa following Malietoa Tinai Taimalelagi "Natuitasina"’s death; (Malietoa Vaiinupo had two sons, from his first marriage, the eldest "Tautaioleua" died in a war, and his son "Salima" lived under Malietoa Vai'inupo's shade, He had a family of his own and live like a normal person, a royal blood that was not recognized) Mōlī married Fa‘alaitaua [Faaala], the daughter of Su‘apa‘ia from Sālelavalu, Savaii who also seems to have held the sa‘o‘aualuma title of Fuatino. This wife bore a son named Laupepa who later became Malietoa. Mōlī also seems to have fathered a son named Mōlī [or Moti] as well as a son named Faleono who is claimed to have been Mōlī’s eldest. Malietoa Mōlī was installed as Malietoa in 1858 or 1859 and probably received the Gato‘aitele and Tamasoāli‘i titles at that time. He had previously been named Tuiātua in 1841 and he held this distinction until his death. Unlike his uncle Taimalelagi and half-brother Talavou, Mōlī was a steadfast devotee of the London Missionary Society and consequently enjoyed the support of the increasingly powerful church.

== Tenure as Malietoa ==
Mōlī’s short term as titleholder “was notable for his humiliation by foreign consuls” and Robert Louis Stevenson recounts several examples of the dishonor and embarrassment suffered at the hands of western politicians. He was “seized on several occasions by captains of warships of various nations as a hostage to secure the capture of Samoans who had offended European settlers”. The most famous of these incidents involved a highborn man from Sāgone, Savai‘i who in 1856 had murdered a European named William Fox in Sāla‘ilua, Savai‘i. Samoan justice was served when Sāla’ilua reciprocally took the life of a Sāgone noble, but “this was no settlement in European eyes” and a British gunship pummeled the Sāgone coast with cannon fire. Mōlī was later punished with fines and “forced to assent to the execution” of the perpetrator. The judicial settlement of this incident took place in November 1858 while Taimalelagi lay dying and the bulk of administrative duties were already vested in Mōlī.

== Death and titular transfer ==
When Mōlī's own passing became inevitable, two contenders emerged as legitimate heirs to the Malietoa title: Mōlī's younger brother Talavou (the Tupu o Sālafai) and Mōlī's own son, Malietoa Laupepa. Malietoa Mōlī – the Tuiātua, Gato‘aitele and Tamasoāli‘i – died in 1860 and was buried in a grand tomb at Malie after holding the Malietoa title for less than two years. His descendants, including Malietoa Tanumafili II and Malietoa Mōlī II, form the modern Sā Mōlī branch of the Sā Malietoa descent line.

== See also ==
- Bombardment of Upolu
- United States Exploring Expedition

Regnal titles
Preceded by Malietoa Natuitasina	Malietoa; 1858–1860	Succeeded by Malietoa Talavou Tonumaipe’a
