= A Footnote to History: Eight Years of Trouble in Samoa =

1892 book by Robert Louis Stevenson

- Author: Robert Louis Stevenson
- Language: English
- Subject: Samoan Civil War
- Publisher: Cassell
- Publication date: 1892
- Media type: book
- Pages: 322
- ISBN: 0-8248-1857-1
- OCLC: 227258432

A Footnote to History: Eight Years of Trouble in Samoa is an 1892 historical non-fiction work by Scottish-born author Robert Louis Stevenson describing the contemporary Samoan Civil War.

Robert Louis Stevenson arrived in Samoa in 1889 and built a house at Vailima. He quickly became passionately interested, and involved, in the attendant political machinations. These involved the three great powers battling for influence in Samoa – the United States, Germany and Britain – and the political machinations of the various Samoan factions within their indigenous political system. The book covers the period from 1882 to 1892.

The book served as such a stinging protest against existing conditions that it resulted in the recall of two officials, and Stevenson for a time feared that it would result in his own deportation. When things had finally blown over he wrote to Sidney Colvin, who came from a family of distinguished colonial administrators, "I used to think meanly of the plumber; but how he shines beside the politician!"

A contemporary review of the book noted:

For the many who take a personal interest in Mr. Stevenson's career the book will have an additional interest in the spectacle of a master of fiction struggling, on the whole successfully, with the trammels of fact.
