= Malietoa Talavou Tonumaipeʻa =

Malietoa "King" Talavou
- Malietoa of Samoa, Tonumaipe'a, Tuia'ana, Tupu o Salafai
- Reign: 1869-1880 jointly held the Malietoa title with his nephew Laupepa, officially made "King" August 28, 1879 - November 9, 1880
- Predecessor: Malietoa Moli (older half brother)
- Successor: Malietoa Laupepa (nephew-M. Moli's son)
- Born: circa 1810; Sapapali'i, Savai'i, Samoa
- Died: November 9, 1880; Apia, Samoa
- Burial: Sapapali'i
- Spouse: Fa'amelea Lei'ataualesa Malulaufa'i
- Issue: Ta'imua Malietoa Fa'alataitaua
- House: Maota o Pouesi- Sapapali'i, Savai'i, Samoa
- Father: Malietoa Vai'inupo Tavita
- Mother: Fuataiotuimaleali'ifano Malietoa Muagutiti'a (also known as Malietoa Ti'a)

Le Susuga Malietoa Talavou Tonumaipeʻa (c. 1810 - November 9, 1880) was installed as "King" of Samoa to the western world on August 28, 1879, until his death on November 9, 1880. Since Malietoa Talavou's half brother's (same father M. Vai'inupo) death, Malietoa Moli in 1860, ongoing wars due to power and authority struggle between Talavou and Laupepa (M. Talavou's nephew-his half brother M. Moli's eldest son) over the next Malietoa title holder and the gaining of support by the districts of Samoa. Family rivalry existed as did a 30-year age difference drew a wedge between Malietoa Laupepa and Malietoa Talavou. They were known to be longtime rivals over the Malietoa title.

Since the death of M. Moli in 1860, the people of Samoa were undecided in their allegiance to one Malietoa title holder. In 1869, Talavou was conferred the Malietoa title by the majority of the districts (Faasalelega, Manono, parts of Tuamasaga to Mulinuʻu. This included people from Leulumoega and Lufilufi) all of whom were against Laupepa's claim to the Malietoa title. Also in 1869, Laupepa was strongly supported by the majority in the Tuamasaga district. Both Talavou and Laupepa jointly held the Malietoa title until their deaths.

At the end of Malietoa Gatuitasina's (M Moli and M Talavou's uncle) reign and death in 1858, the Malietoa title did not transition downward in its normal traditional order of succession by generation, age and seniority. M. Talavou should have succeeded M. Moli because they were in the same generation and M. Laupepa was in the next generation. M. Moli and M. Talavou are also half brothers (same father M. Vai'inupo). M. Moli reigned for two years 1858-1860 and died in 2 years after M. Gatuitasina's death on October 1, 1858.

Malietoa Laupepa was installed as "King" in 1875 then four years later Malietoa Talavou was finally proclaimed and appointed as "King" in his latter years on August 28, 1879, officially recognized on record by the German, British and American governments. Malietoa Talavou was born c. 1810 to Malietoa Vai'inupo Tavita, by his second wife Fuataiotuimaleali'ifano Malietoa Muagututi'a (also known as Malietoa Ti'a). It was reported, in a local newsletter, that Malietoa Talavou died on November 9, 1880 (at the age of 70). No official record of Malietoa Talavou's cause of death.

== Early and family life ==
Talavou (which means "young" or "energetic" in Samoan) was born in Sāpapāli‘i, Savai'i, Samoa sometime around the year 1810. He lived most of his life on Savai‘i where he commissioned the construction of his tulaga maota named Pouesi ("Papaya-wood Post"). A modern ceremonial meetinghouse now stands on the Pouesi land which is considered the crownland of Talavou's modern descendants, collectively known as the Sā Talavou. Talavou's tenure as Malietoa was filled with warfare, religious partisanship, and political maneuvering (including marriage-alliances). He had five wives: (1) Talavou's first wife was Fa‘amelea; a daughter of Lei‘ataualesā Malulaufai of Faleu, Manono. Kraemer claims her father was Malulaufa‘i, the brother of Taimalelagi Lei‘ataua. Fa‘alataolefuaaleaigailetai [Fa‘alataitaua, Fa‘alataaloali‘i ] was the son of this couple who went on to become Malietoa, Seiuliali‘i and Ta‘imua. He was installed as the next Mataafa by Mataafa Iosefo the 'Alii Sili' during the German Rule in Samoa (1900 - 1914).

(2) Talavou's second wife was [Taemanea Falenaoti, this woman was known as Mataouli as mentioned by Dr. Kramer] the daughter of the high chief [Sala Lenuanua] of Lealatele Savai’i. The couple had three children, a son named Tapu (Tapuulafiti) and 2 daughters Taofimalo (Taofimaloafiafiovasa) and Fuatai (Fuataiotui). Tapuulafiti married [Taele] the daughter of [Leta'a Uipo] of Apia, they had a son who acquired the titles [Papali'i Taimalelagi Tuiletufuga]. Taofimalo married [Tevaga Akalemo Filipo] of Lealatele. They had a son, [Tevaga Milo Filipo] and a daughter [Malia Taliilagi Filipo].

(2) (3) Third wife Tu‘ua was the daughter of chief Taliaoa from Afega, Tuamasaga and the mother of a daughter named Ali‘itasi.

(4) An unnamed woman from Si‘umu is listed as a fourth wife who bore a child named Mu, although accounts are inconsistent as to whether this child was a male or female.

(5) The details of the fifth wife are unknown.

== Military involvement ==
Talavou's appetite for war and talent for victory were developed early in his life under the tutelage of his father Vai‘inupō and his uncle Taimalelagi. He was already leading his own war parties in 1830 and had gained a feared reputation while still a young man. Talavou was often called Malietoa Pe‘a because he received the influential Tonumaipe‘a title shortly after Tamafaigā's death. Kraemer wrote that Manono assisted him in “wresting” the title from Sātupa‘itea (Kraemer I:320) but Tuiatua Tupua Tamasese Tupuola Efi asserts that the Tonumaipe‘a came to Talavou at “the instigation of Manono” through his arranged marriage to “a lady of Tamafaigā’s family" (Efi 1995).

== Religious affiliations ==
Talavou's first association with Christianity was through John Williams (missionary) and the London Missionary Society. Talavou was one of Vai‘inupō's sons mentioned by Williams as having accepted the Lotu without Vai‘inupō's permission in 1832. Talavou abruptly ended his affiliation with the L.M.S. in 1842 when Taimalelagi turned against the Christians (Meleiseā 1987a:74-77). Taimalelagi remained anti-Christian until his death but Talavou later attached himself to the Wesleyan [Methodist] sect “through his Tongan kin” (Meleiseā 1987b:239). Talavou was one of the first Samoan missionaries of the L.M.S. and he may have become an active advocate of Methodism as well. Talavou was a keen student and statesman who was highly respected by resident Europeans on account of his dignified and friendly demeanor, not to mention his impressive command of both the English and Samoan languages. On account of his linguistic proficiencies and religious interest he was also commissioned to assist in the translation of the Holy Bible into the Samoan language. This “excellent” translation took place between 1835 and 1845 (Masterman 30) but Talavou probably only actively participated in the first seven years of translation process.

Since the Malietoa and Lei‘ataua families were related to and allied with the ruling families of Tonga it was politically favorable that Talavou take up the religion of his supporters. Since Talavou was unsuccessful in rallying all of Samoa behind his mālō, the espousal of the Methodist denomination may have been designed to provide a unified religious front in opposition to the Sā Mōlī's L.M.S. faction. Talavou's conversion to the Lotu Toga also emphasizes political connections with Tonga which are often overlooked. European accounts from the 1770s reveal that Samoa and Tonga were actively engaged in interisland travel, warfare, chiefly intermarriage, and political affairs. King Siaosi [George] Tupou Tāufa‘āhau of Tonga had staunchly supported the Methodist cause taken up by Manono, which was the home island of his Samoan wife Sālata. Tāufa‘āhau and the Tu‘i Kanokupolu establishment were deeply involved in Manono politics and it is likely that his support was held in high regard by the Malietoa faction as well.

Talavou defected from the L.M.S. and joined himself to the Lotu Toga in 1842, perhaps in conjunction with a Tongan alliance formalized with Tonga during Tāufa‘āhau's visit in that same year. Sioeli [Joel] Tupou and Peniamina [Benjamin] Latūselu were both Methodist preachers of noble Tongan ancestry who were noted for their involvement in Manono religious and political spheres of the time. Certainly there were many genuine converts to Christianity, but ulterior political motives cannot be ignored as the impetus for many religious conversions during this time period. Like his father, it seems that Talavou's professions of Christianity were more of a socio-political tactic than a spiritual conversion, especially since he continued to defy basic Christian tenets regarding plural marriage and warfare until his death.

== Family rivalry ==
After Mōlī's death, the Sā Malietoa was torn along religious and geopolitical lines: Savai‘i, Manono, parts of Tuamasaga and the Methodists (including Tongan Wesleyans) were behind the Sā Talavou while Malie, the rest of Tuamasaga, and the L.M.S. congregationalists remained loyal to Laupepa. The Gato‘aitele and Tamasoāli‘i were conferred upon To‘oā Sualauvī who was to serve as temporary guardian of the titles until the “official” Malietoa was chosen and installed. Even though Talavou was a seasoned leader and feared warrior, Malie authorities opposed his leadership because of the loss of prestige his mālō had suffered at the hands of the British who had bombarded Sāgone and Palauli in 1859. The leaders of Savai‘i and ‘Āiga i le Tai opposed the nomination of Laupepa because of his youth and lack of experience in leadership and war. It was also argued that the customary practice called toe o le uso, “the right of the remaining brother,” should have been followed (Keesing 1934:63) as set forth by the example of the Vaiinupō-to-Taimalelagi (brother to younger brother) succession. Although Talavou came the closest, neither candidate succeeded in gaining all of Samoa's support and so both were nominated and ratified as Malietoa by their respective constituencies.

== Wars of the Confederation – Taua o le Faitasiga ==
After Malietoa Mōlī died in 1860 there was no universally recognized leader of Samoa and since the rival contenders had not yet met in battle there was neither an itū mālō nor itū vaivai. Talavou's constituency vastly outnumbered the Laupepa partisans but neither succeeded in gaining complete control over all of Samoa's districts. In 1868, the chiefs and orators loyal to Laupepa instituted a government based on the Western notion of parliamentary monarchy. Malietoa Laupepa was declared King of Samoa in 1869, and relocated his government seat from Malie to Matautu on the east shore of Apia Harbor. Talavou's supporters soon discovered the plot and adamantly refused Laupepa's claim to the kingship, rejecting him as the leader or organizer of any such confederation (faitasiga). Talavou's supporters hurriedly established a rival government seat across the harbor on the Mulinu‘u peninsula, crowning Talavou as King of Samoa. Laupepa was deeply insulted when “all the district leaders” of Samoa – including several from Malietoa Laupepa’s territories – held the deliberating fono at Talavou’s base in Mulinu’u rather than convening at Matautu (Meleiseā 1978a:78).

Even though the faitasiga was Laupepa’s brainchild, it was obvious that he would not be supported as its leader. Laupepa then sent an army to raid Mulinu‘u and Talavou was forced to return to Savai‘i in 1869. Within a couple of months Talavou had amassed a fleet of warriors that far surpassed Laupepa’s militias and Talavou’s warriors from Savai‘i, Manono, Atua, and A‘ana reestablished his government at Mulinu‘u later on that year. “The battle was carried on,” according to Thomas Trood, “around Apia for 72 consecutive hours, without any intermission” and it was during this battle that the British flag was torn from the British Consulate and the head of a decapitated British soldier was impaled on a fencepost in front of the Consulate building. Talavou feared British retribution and issued a formal apology by way of ifoga and even though Consul Williams rejected the gesture, Great Britain was counted “along with Malietoa Laupepa’s party, as one of the vaivai” because the Consulate did not send warships to punish Talavou (Meleiseā 1987a:79).

Many of Malietoa Laupepa’s supporters fled to their homes but a portion of the army fled south to Sāfata where they defended themselves so fiercely that Talavou’s warriors eventually grew weary of fighting and left Laupepa’s warriors in peace. Laupepa’s allies in Atua and A‘ana built villages to serve as refugee camps for Laupepa’s Tuamasaga supporters who were being driven from their homes by Talavou’s forces. A Native Government document shows that garrisons of Talavou’s “people” from Tuamasaga and Savai‘i were occupying tracts of land in Atua and A‘ana respectively (Tuvale 18). Laupepa's naval force, led by two “European boats”(probably taumualua ) was destroyed by Talavou's Manono-based fleet off the A‘ana coast near Faleasi‘u and Tufulele in 1870, the same year that the Manono sea-warriors defeated Laupepa's Fagaloa-based fleet offshore at Nofoali‘i, A‘ana (Tuvale 18–19).

On several occasions, Malietoa Laupepa himself fled Tuamasaga and sought temporary refuge in A‘ana where he garnered support among relatives and Tumua allies from A‘ana and Atua districts (Keesing 1934:63); he was also “in retirement” in 1873 during which time he sought refuge for about two years with his father's-sister, Patosina [Emma]. In 1871, Talavou and Laupepa observed a brief period of peace and mourning in memory of their fallen kinsman Tuimaleali‘ifano To‘oā Sualauvī. Following this cease-fire the island of ‘Upolu erupted in violence as Talavou’s forces fought Laupepa’s in Tuamasaga, warriors from Itū-o-Tane, Savai‘i besieged Leulumoega, A‘ana and Talavou’s Fa‘asāleleaga fleet invaded Atua.

The War of the Faitasiga was actually a series of conflicts that did not truly end until Talavou’s death in 1880, even though official peace talks were held in April 1873. During the negotiations both parties decided that Laupepa would be installed in joint-kingship with a “co-king” nominated by the Sā Tupua and that Talavou would return to Savai‘i, ending his four-year occupation of Tuamasaga. As the leader of the itū mālō it seems strange that Talavou would agree to give up his holdings on ‘Upolu and relinquish his claim to the throne and there is indication that the Tuamasaga-Manono-Savai‘i party installed him as King of Samoa in 1874. Tupua Pulepule was chosen over Tuiatua Matā‘afa Fagamanu to rule with Laupepa as joint-king. The dual kingship was supplemented by the “Fono of Ta‘imua, with seven members representing each main district, and the Fono of Faipule, with 36 representatives from the sub-districts” (Meleiseā 1987b:82).

== Malietoa Talavou, Malietoa Laupepa and New Governments ==
In May 1875, an influential American colonel, Albert Steinberger, coordinated the drafting of a constitution which did away with the co-kingship, reorganized the Faipule and Ta‘imua parliaments, and established a “rotating” kingship which provided the chance for both the Sā Malietoa and the Sā Tupua to occupy the throne in alternating succession. This meant that Laupepa would rule as King of Samoa for four years, at which time a king would be chosen from the Sā Tupua to rule for four years, etc. Steinberger also gained the trust and support of King Laupepa, the Ta‘imua and the Faipule and secured the office of Premier for himself on May 22, 1875 (Gilson 318).

In 1876, King Laupepa was coerced by American Consul Foster and L.M.S. figures into signing Steinberger's deportation order, an action that sorely disappointed the members of the Faipule and the Ta‘imua. The two Fono houses removed Malietoa Laupepa from the throne and Tupua Tamasese Titimaea emerged as a new leader. Meanwhile, Laupepa established himself in Malie and rallied support for his campaign, known as the Puletua. The Puletua declared Laupepa king in June 1877, reinforced the Taumuafā fortress and declared war on the Ta‘imua and Faipule. Malietoa Talavou mobilized his forces to attack Laupepa's Puletua in July 1877, prompting Laupepa's men to flee Taumuafā for Vaimoso (Tuvale 23). The Puletua disbanded in mid-July when Laupepa was captured by men from Manono and Talavou's victory against Laupepa's Faipule and Ta‘imua sympathizers was sealed three months later at Fale‘ula, Tuamasaga.

The Ta‘imua and Faipule reassumed their operation but were unable to simultaneously govern the nation and deal with foreign consular demands; within months of Puletua's defeat, much of Samoa began looking once again to the two Malietoas for leadership. In 1878, Talavou's government was reestablished in Mulinu‘u with Talavou declared King of Samoa. Talavou reportedly received the Tuia‘ana title around this time, in January 1879 (Tu'u'u 2002). Talavou was again installed as king on August 28, 1879, and Laupepa's supporters immediately opposed to this new government. When the Ta‘imua and Faipule expressed their discontent with Talavou's coronation they were immediately dismissed from Mulinu‘u and literally chased to the A‘ana border by Talavou's warriors from Vaimauga and Faleata (Tuvale 27).

Malietoa Talavou suffered great humiliation when he was taken hostage in July 1879 under command of village leaders from the Gagaifomauga and Gaga‘emauga districts of northern Savai‘i. The village councils involved were fined $2,500 by the government and personal vengeance would later be exacted by Talavou through devastating attacks against Saleaula in 1880. By September 1879, another major war was waging between the two declared Malietoa kings of Samoa. Malietoa Laupepa had met with delegates of the foreign consuls and signed a convention through which “the Samoan Government gave up all jurisdiction over the town, harbour and neighborhood of Apia” (Sorenson & Theroux 2005). Many Samoans opposed Laupepa's actions, which were becoming more and more “puppet-like,” and by December 1879, most of Laupepa's Puletua chiefs had rallied behind Talavou and his Pulefou, as the new government was called; even the demoralized houses of the Ta‘imua and Faipule endorsed Talavou's right to the throne. The ascension was made official through the Bismarck Constitution signed on December 15, 1879, aboard the German corvette SMS Bismarck. Under the new constitution Malietoa Talavou was recognized as King of Samoa for life; this decision was ratified by the British government on January 14, 1880 (through Captain Purvis’ recognition of Talavou's sovereignty), and again on March 24, 1880, by the governments of the United States, Great Britain and Germany (Bevans 68–70). Laupepa was named Suitupu (“Vice-King” or “Deputy King”) and Matā‘afa Iosefo, Premier

While support for Talavou as king was overwhelming, it was not unanimous. In June 1880 the Tumua confederates of Atua formally declared their opposition to Talavou's kingship; Talavou reacted by sending a war party to attack an A‘ana delegation headed for Atua. More chaos ensued in early 1880 when the chiefs of Palauli, Sāleaula, and Tutuila sided with the Tumua faction of the A‘ana and Atua districts. The Samoan chronicler Te‘o Tuvale recorded that the Talavou's enraged supporters from Sātuapa‘itea Fa‘asāleleaga “arose and drove away the people of Palauli and burned their village” (66). The Tumua quickly launched a counterattack against Talavou's districts in Savai‘i but the A‘ana-Atua fleet was repelled and the Tumua's audacity was rewarded with further razing of A‘ana plantations and communities at the hands of Talavou's Tuamasaga faction (66).

== Death and succession ==
Malietoa Talavou, “the central figure” (Gray 68) of the newborn Samoan monarchy, died November 8, 1880, as King of Samoa, Tupu o Sālafai, Tonumaipe‘a, and alleged Tuia‘ana. His nephew Malietoa Laupepa was seated on the throne nine days later. Talavou's son, Fa'alataitaua, was installed as Malietoa in 1900 and also served as Ta'imua until his death in 1910 (Efi 1995).

Preceded by Malietoa Moli	Malietoa Talavou Tonumaipe’a; 1869-1880	Succeeded by Malietoa Laupepa
