= Mulinuʻu =

Village of Apia, Samoa

- Village
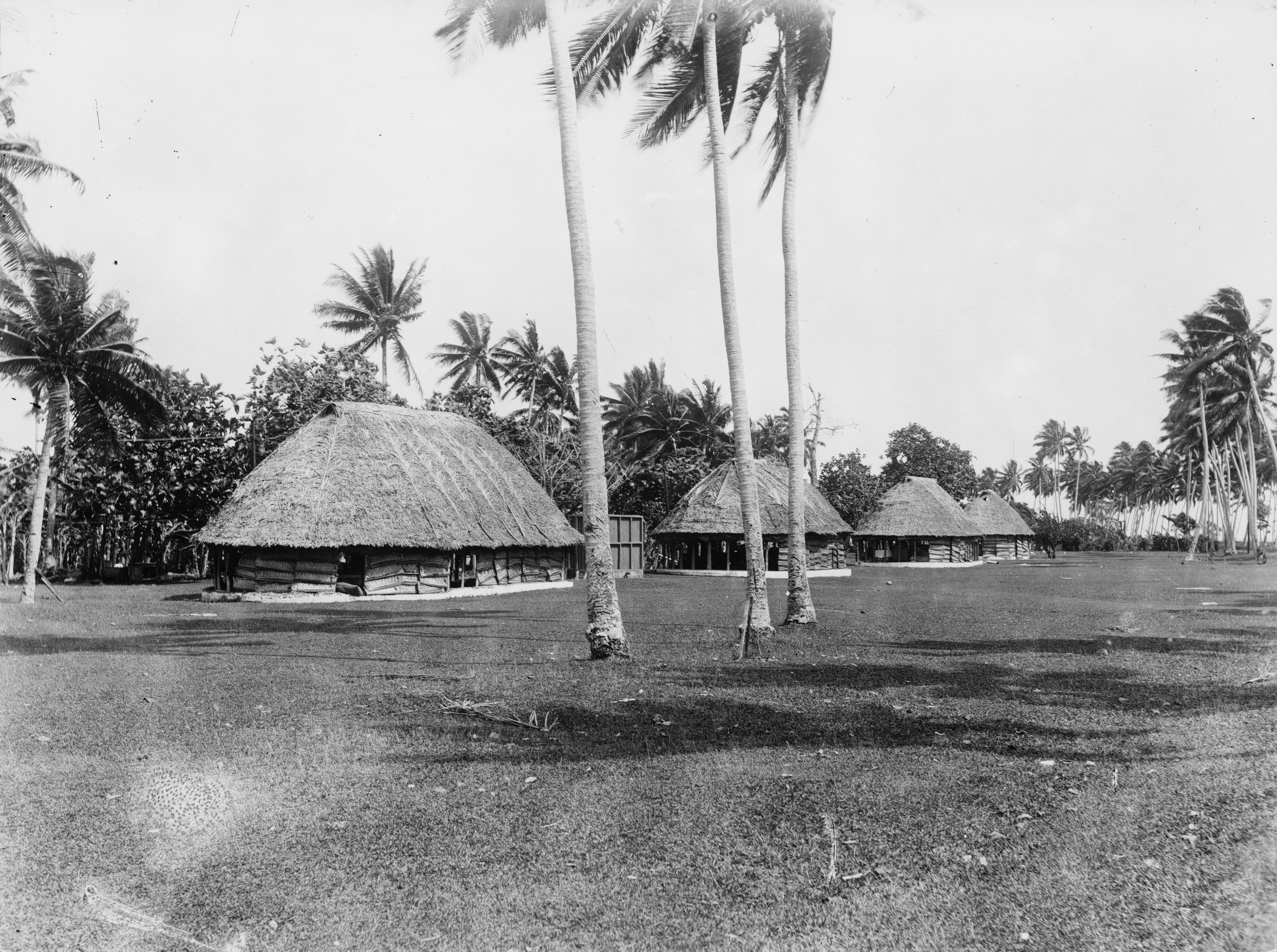
- Oval fale in Mulinuʻu (undated, c. 1893–1949)

- Location in Samoa
- Coordinates: 13°49′S 171°47′W
- Country: Samoa
- District: Tuamasaga
- Urban area: Apia

Population (2016)
  - Total: 27

Mulinuʻu is a small village situated on a tiny peninsula of Upolu island in Samoa. It became the site of the colonial administration in Samoa in the 1870s and continues to be the seat of government as the location of the Parliament of Samoa. It is located on the central-north coast of Upolu and is administratively part of the district of Tuamasaga and the urban area comprising Apia, the country's capital. The population of Mulinuʻu is 27 as of the 2016 census.

The peninsula Mulinuʻu is situated on is the location of a few other villages, the site of the Fale Fono or Parliament House, and the Lands and Titles Court. At the tip of the peninsula is the meteorology office, which was initially established in the late 19th century as an observatory. The peninsula is also the site of several important tombs, including that of one of the first heads of state (O le Ao o le Malo), Malietoa Tanumafili II.

The flag of the German colonial office was raised in Mulinuʻu on 1 March 1900 to symbolise the beginning of German colonial rule in Samoa.

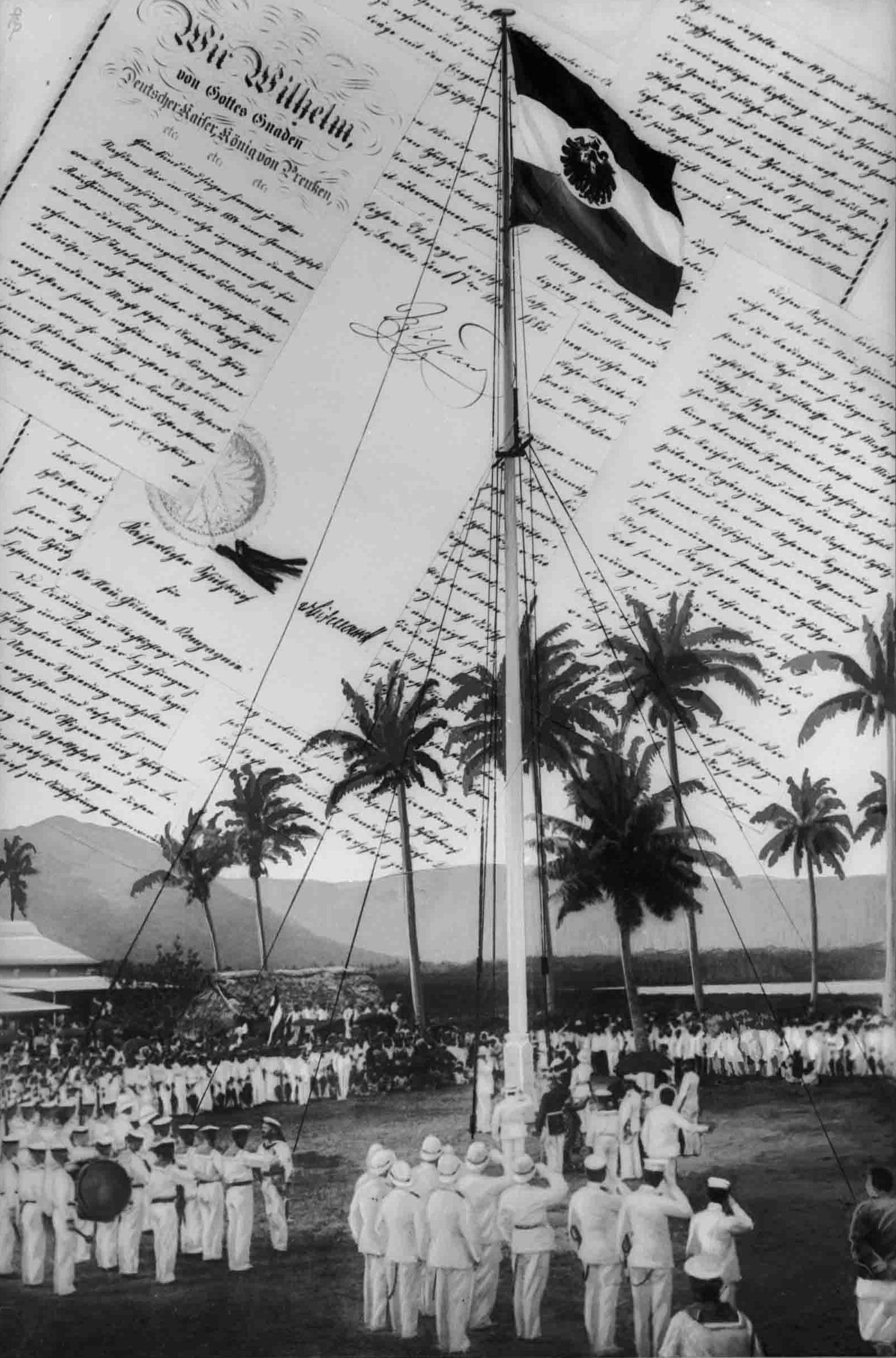
Raising of the flag of the German colonial office in Mulinuʻu on 1 March 1900

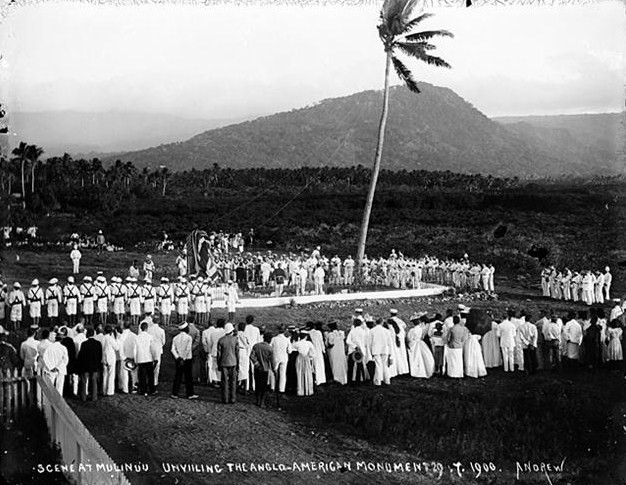
Unveiling of the Anglo-American Monument at Mulinuʻu on 29 July 1900. Mount Vaea, the burial place of Robert Louis Stevenson, is in the background.
