= List of shipwrecks in June 1870 =

The list of shipwrecks in June 1870 includes ships sunk, foundered, grounded, or otherwise lost during June 1870.

== 1 June ==
List of shipwrecks: 1 June 1870
Ship	State	Description
Cremorne	United States	The clipper passed through the Golden Gate, California bound for Liverpool, Lancashire, United Kingdom. No further trace, presumed foundered with the loss of all hands.

== 2 June ==
List of shipwrecks: 2 June 1870
Ship	State	Description
Clymping	United Kingdom	The brig was run down by the steamship Euxène (France) and sank in the Mediterranean Sea 120 nautical miles (220 km) off Alexandria, Egypt. Her crew were rescued.
Henrietta	Bremen	The barque was wrecked on Whalsay, Shetland Islands, United Kingdom. Her crew were rescued. She was on a voyage from the River Tyne to Pará, Brazil.
Onward	United Kingdom	The brigantine was damaged by fire at Plymouth, Devon.
Selina	United Kingdom	The ship collided with the steamship Constance (France) and foundered off the Longships Lighthouse, Cornwall. Her crew were rescued by Constance. Selina was on a voyage from Porthcawl, Glamorgan to Plymouth.
Thomas Seddon	United Kingdom	The ship ran aground at Rangoon, Burma. She was refloated and beached on Diamond Island, where she was wrecked.

== 4 June ==
List of shipwrecks: 4 June 1870
Ship	State	Description
Britannia	United Kingdom	The steamship was driven ashore at Lindisfarne, Northumberland. Six of her passengers were landed. She was on a voyage from Leith, Lothian to Newcastle upon Tyne, Northumberland. She was refloated the next day and assisted in to South Shields, County Durham.
Caroline Coventry	United Kingdom	The ship was driven ashore at Breaksea Point, Glamorgan. She was refloated.

== 5 June ==
List of shipwrecks: 5 June 1870
Ship	State	Description
Cumberland	United Kingdom	The full-rigged ship was damaged by fire at London.
W. F. Storer	United States	The ship caught fire and sank at New York. She was refloated on 18 June.

== 6 June ==
List of shipwrecks: 6 June 1870
Ship	State	Description
Ancestor	United Kingdom	The barque was sunk by ice in the Atlantic Ocean. Her thirteen crew were rescued. She was on a voyage from Montreal, Quebec, Canada to Bristol, Gloucestershire.
Arctic Hero	United Kingdom	The ship ran aground on the Sneadermann Rock, in the Farne Islands, Northumberland. She was on a voyage from Huelva, Spain to Berwick upon Tweed, Northumberland. She was refloated and towed in to Berwick upon Tweed.
Catherine	United Kingdom	The ship struck Inchkeith and sank. Her crew were rescued. She was on a voyage from Bridgeness, Lothian to Inchkeith.
Countess of Dudley	United Kingdom	The ship was driven ashore at Dimlington, Yorkshire. She was refloated and resumed her voyage.
County of Lancaster	United Kingdom	The ship ran aground off "Maddeburg", Netherlands East Indies. She was on a voyage from Glasgow, Renfrewshire to Surabaya, Netherlands East Indies. She was refloated and towed in to Surabaya.
Devonshire	United Kingdom	The ship was wrecked at St. Pauls, Nova Scotia, Canada. Her crew were rescued. She was on a voyage from Liverpool to Quebec City, Canada.
Dunkeld	New South Wales	The barque departed from Newcastle for Melbourne, Victoria. She may have been sighted in distress on 27 June; presumed foundered with the loss of all hands.
Edouard Corbière	France	The ship ran aground on the Haisborough Sands, in the North Sea off the coast of Norfolk, United Kingdom. She was refloated.
Gold Hunter	United Kingdom	The ship was driven ashore on New Island. She was on a voyage from Maryport, Cumberland to Belfast, County Antrim.
Halyma	United Kingdom	The steamship ran aground and sank in the Guadiana. She was on a voyage from Pomaron, Portugal to Gloucester and/or Liverpool, Lancashire. She was later refloated and placed under repair.
Royal Albert	United Kingdom	The yacht capsized off Hastings, Sussex with the loss of all but eight of the fourteen people on board. Survivors were rescued by local fishermen.
William F. Storer	United States	The ship was destroyed by fire at New York. She was on a voyage from New York to Liverpool.

== 7 June ==
List of shipwrecks: 7 June 1870
Ship	State	Description
Admiral Napier	United Kingdom	The schooner foundered 4 nautical miles (7.4 km) south east of Pladda. Her crew survived. She was on a voyage from Liverpool, Lancashire to Aberdeen.
Layard	Victoria	The 175-ton brig parted her cable and became grounded on a reef near Timaru, New Zealand, where she was headed with a cargo of coal from Newcastle, New South Wales. Her crew reached shore safely but the vessel subsequently broke up.

== 8 June ==
List of shipwrecks: 8 June 1870
Ship	State	Description
Admiral Napier	United Kingdom	The ship foundered off the Isle of Arran. She was on a voyage from Liverpool, Lancashire to Aberdeen. Her captain and owner were subsequently charged with barratry.
Olof	Norway	The ship ran aground and was severely damaged at Shoreham-by-Sea, Sussex, United Kingdom. She was on a voyage from Norrköping to Shoreham-by-Sea.
Orphelius	France	The schooner was driven ashore at Par, Cornwall, United Kingdom. She was refloated and taken in to Par.
Ruby	New Zealand	The 24-ton schooner stranded on rocks and became wrecked at Kaikōura during a heavy storm.
shipTripoli	United Kingdom	The steamship was driven ashore at Cohasset, Massachusetts, United States. She was on a voyage from Liverpool, Lancashire to Boston, Massachusetts.
Tyne	United Kingdom	The schooner was driven ashore on the Holm of Papa, Orkney Islands. She was refloated and taken in to Stromness, where she was repaired.
Ville Neuve	France	The ship was driven ashore at Mogadore, Morocco. She was consequently condemned.

== 9 June ==
List of shipwrecks: 9 June 1870
Ship	State	Description
Admiral Napier	United Kingdom	The ship sprang a leak and sank off Pladda, Inner Hebrides. Her crew were rescued. She was on a voyage from Liverpool, Lancashire to Aberdeen.
Industry	United Kingdom	The ship was wrecked near the Mull of Galloway Lighthouse, Wigtownshire. Her crew were rescued.
Lizzy	New Zealand	The 20-ton cutter was driven ashore and wrecked at Ōpunake during a gale.
Louisa	United Kingdom	The ship was wrecked near Caragibe, Brazil. She was on a voyage from Maceio, Brazil to the English Channel.
Meglee	United Kingdom	The brig was damaged by fire at Hartlepool, County Durham.
Star of the West	United Kingdom	The ship struck the Kella Rocks, off Ouessant, Finistère, France and foundered. All 26 people on board were rescued by the steamship Sherburne (United Kingdom). Star of the West was on a voyage from Port Elizabeth, Cape Colony to London.

== 10 June ==
List of shipwrecks: 10 June 1870
Ship	State	Description
Guinevere	United Kingdom	The yacht ran aground on the Maplin Sand, in the North Sea off the coast of Essex. She floated off and was driven ashore at Shoeburyness, Essex.
Little Mountain	United Kingdom	The steamship collided with a schooner in the River Mersey and was beached at Egremont, Lancashire. She was on a voyage from Dublin to Runcorn, Cheshire. She was refloated the next day and taken in to Liverpool, Lancashire.
Orion	Russia	The ship was driven ashore at "Sundre". She was on a voyage from Newcastle upon Tyne, Northumberland, United Kingdom to Saint Petersburg.

== 11 June ==
List of shipwrecks: 11 June 1870
Ship	State	Description
Constance	United Kingdom	The ship ran aground on the Dwars-inden-weg. She was refloated with assistance from the tug Zeeland (Netherlands).
Killarney	United Kingdom	The steamship was beached at Egremont, Lancashire in a sinking condition. She was on a voyage from Dublin to Liverpool.

== 12 June ==
List of shipwrecks: 12 June 1870
Ship	State	Description
Constance	United Kingdom	The ship was driven ashore at "Dwars-in-Den-weg". She was on a voyage from Benin, Africa to Rotterdam, South Holland, Netherlands.
Newbiggin	United Kingdom	The ship was destroyed by fire in the Sea of Marmara. Her crew were rescued by Tini Gattorno (Italy). Newbiggin was on a voyage from Cardiff, Glamorgan to Constantinople, Ottoman Empire.
Western Queen	United Kingdom	The ship was wrecked on Glover's Reef. She was on a voyage from Puerto Cabello, Venezuela to Sombrero, Anguilla.

== 13 June ==
List of shipwrecks: 13 June 1870
Ship	State	Description
Sir John Dryden	United Kingdom	The steamship was wrecked on "Ras Safoon", near Aden. Her crew were rescued. She was on a voyage from Bombay, India to Liverpool, Lancashire.

== 14 June ==
List of shipwrecks: 14 June 1870
Ship	State	Description
Ecuador	United Kingdom	The steamship suffered a boiler explosion and sank off the coast of Supe, Peru with the loss of thirteen lives. There were at least 21 survivors. Five people were reported missing.
Hirondelle	France	The steamship sank with the loss of eight lives. She was on a voyage from Bordeaux, Gironde to La Bastide.
Lioness	United Kingdom	The tug struck the anchor of a floating landing stage and sank in the River Mersey at New Brighton, Cheshire. Her crew were rescued.
Salamander	United Kingdom	The ship was sighted in the Atlantic Ocean whilst on a voyage from Newcastle upon Tyne, Northumberland to Singapore, Straits Settlements. No further trace, presumed foundered with the loss of all hands.

== 15 June ==
List of shipwrecks: 15 June 1870
Ship	State	Description
Henry Brain	United Kingdom	The barque collided with the full-rigged ship Humber (United Kingdom) and sank in the Grand Banks of Newfoundland with the loss of eight of her crew. Survivors were rescued by Humber. Henry Brain was on a voyage from Alexandria, Egypt to Quebec City, Canada.
Landoro	United Kingdom	The ship was wrecked in the Cape Verde Islands. She was on a voyage from Liverpool, Lancashire to Bonny, Africa.

== 16 June ==
List of shipwrecks: 16 June 1870
Ship	State	Description
Anna Mathilde	France	The ship was run ashore near Rochester, Kent, United Kingdom. She was on a voyage from Rochester to Caen, Calvados.
George Armstrong	United Kingdom	The ship was driven ashore near Sulina, Ottoman Empire. She was on a voyage from Sulina to a British port. She was refloated the next day with the assistance of a tug.
Zephyr	Norway	The schooner was severely damaged at Sunderland, County Durham, United Kingdom by an onboard explosion that killed the sole crew member on board.

== 17 June ==
List of shipwrecks: 17 June 1870
Ship	State	Description
Adel	Sweden	The brig foundered west of St. Ives, Cornwall, United Kingdom. Four of her ten crew were reported missing.
Emma	France	The steamship was driven ashore on Terschelling, Friesland, Netherlands. She was on a voyage from Havre de Grâce, Seine-Inférieure to Hamburg.
Forward	Mexican pirates	Battle of Boca Teacapan: The Canadian steamship, which had been seized by Mexican pirates and was in use as a pirate ship, was beached in the Teacapan Estuary at Boca Teacapan, Sinaloa, Mexico, when she was destroyed by United States Navy and United States Marine Corps personnel manning six boats – a howitzer-equipped launch and five cutters – from the sloop-of-war USS Mohican (United States Navy).
Lord Metcalfe	United Kingdom	The ship was driven ashore and wrecked at Dungeness, Kent. She was on a voyage from Sunderland, County Durham to Alexandria, Egypt.
Sherboro'	France	The ship was driven ashore on Sherbro Island, Sierra Leone. She was on a voyage from Sherbro Island to Marseille, Bouches-du-Rhône.

== 18 June ==
List of shipwrecks: 18 June 1870
Ship	State	Description
Alert	United Kingdom	The brig ran aground on the Kratzand, near Cuxhaven. She was on a voyage from Bangor, Caernarfonshire to Hamburg.
Harriet	United Kingdom	The steamship ran aground on the Bondicar Rock, off the coast of Northumberland. She was on a voyage from London to Aberdeen. She was later refloated.
Lutterworth	United Kingdom	The ship ran aground on the Muckraputty Lump, in the Hooghly River. She was refloated and taken in to Calcutta, India.
Wild Curlew	United Kingdom	The barque was wrecked on the Sea Rock, in the Gulf of Siam. Her crew were rescued. She was on a voyage from Bangkok, Siam to Singapore, Straits Settlements and a port in China.

== 21 June ==
List of shipwrecks: 21 June 1870
Ship	State	Description
Osiris	United Kingdom	The steamship struck a shoal 3 nautical miles (5.6 km) south west of the Hormigas Islands, Spain and sank. Her crew were rescued by the steamship Joven Pepe (Spain). Osiris was on a voyage from Cardiff, Glamorgan to Alicante, Spain.
Sarah M.	United Kingdom	The ship was holed by ice. She was on a voyage from Quebec City, Canada to Hull, Yorkshire. She continued her voyage in a waterlogged condition.

== 22 June ==
List of shipwrecks: 22 June 1870
Ship	State	Description
Omi	Russia	The schooner was driven ashore at Grimsby, Lincolnshire, United Kingdom. She was on a voyage from Umeå, Sweden to Grimsby.
Royalist	United Kingdom	The brig was abandoned in the Atlantic Ocean. Her crew were rescued. She was on a voyage from Torrevieja, Spain to a Baltic port.
Saint André	United Kingdom	The schooner was abandoned in the Atlantic Ocean 30 nautical miles (56 km) north west of Arranmore, County Donegal, United Kingdom. Her crew were rescued by Anne (United Kingdom). Saint André was on a voyage from St. Martin to Iceland.
Sultana	United Kingdom	The ship ran aground at Saint-Valery-sur-Somme, Somme, France and was damaged. She was on a voyage from Sunderland, County Durham to Saint-Valery-sur-Somme. She was refloated the next day and found to be leaky.

== 23 June ==
List of shipwrecks: 23 June 1870
Ship	State	Description
Auguste	France	The ship struck the quayside at Dieppe, Seine-Inférieure and was severely damaged. She was on a voyage from Danzig to Dieppe.
Charles Lambert	United Kingdom	The barque ran aground at Hartlepool, County Durham. She was on a voyage from West Hartlepool to Kronstadt, Russia.
Marie Celeste	France	The ship was wrecked on the coast of Ireland with the loss of eighteen of her crew.
Mary	United Kingdom	The schooner was in collision with the steamship Sheldrake (United Kingdom) and sank with the loss of one life. Survivors were rescued by Sheldrake, which lost a crew member in the accident. Mary was on a voyage from Barrow in Furness, Lancashire to Cardiff, Glamorgan.
Rose of Sharon	United Kingdom	The fishing trawler was run into by the barque Nathaniel Churchwood ( (Dominion of Newfoundland) Newfoundland Colony) and foundered in the English Channel 15 nautical miles (28 km) north west of the Eddystone Lighthouse, Cornwall. Her crew were rescued by Nathaniel Churchwood.

== 24 June ==
List of shipwrecks: 24 June 1870
Ship	State	Description
Enchantress	United Kingdom	The schooner ran aground on the Arklow Bank, in the Irish Sea off the coast of County Wicklow and sank. Her five crew were rescued by the Arklow Lifeboat.
Geiser	United Kingdom	The schooner collided with the steamship City of Brooklyn (United Kingdom) and sank off the Arklow Bank. Her crew were rescued. Geiser was on a voyage from Queenstown, County Cork to Dublin. She was taken in to Abersoch, Caernarfonshire on 29 June.
Hendrik Vannes	Netherlands	The ship departed from Hartlepool, County Durham, United Kingdom for Riga, Russia. No further trace, presumed foundered with the loss of all hands.
Louisa	Wismar	The ship was wrecked on the Leman Sand, in the North Sea. Her crew were rescued. She was on a voyage from Newcastle upon Tyne, Northumberland, United Kingdom to Rio de Janeiro, Brazil.
Unnamed	Flag unknown	The brigantine ran aground on the Jackshole Bank, in the Irish Sea off the coast of County Wicklow.

== 25 June ==
List of shipwrecks: 25 June 1870
Ship	State	Description
City of London	United Kingdom	The barque ran aground on the Goodwin Sands, Kent. She was on a voyage from Havre de Grâce, Seine-Inférieure, France to London. She was refloated.
Elizabeth	United Kingdom	The ship ran aground on the Haisborough Sands, in the North Sea off the coast of Norfolk. She was on a voyage from Newcastle upon Tyne, Northumberland to Dordrecht, South Holland, Netherlands. She was refloated and taken in to Lowestoft, Suffolk in a severely leaky condition.
Harlech Castle	United Kingdom	The ship departed from Melbourne, Victoria for Newcastle, New South Wales. No further trace, presumed foundered with the loss of all hands.
Louise	Wismar	The schooner was wrecked on the Oar Sand, in the North Sea. Her crew were rescued. She was on a voyage from South Shields, County Durham, United Kingdom to Rio de Janeiro, Brazil.
Sir George Brown	United Kingdom	The brig foundered off the Bloody Foreland, County Donegal. Her crew were rescued. She was on a voyage from Rutland, County Donegal to Dublin.
St. Michaels	United Kingdom	The barque was abandoned at sea. Her crew were rescued. She was on a voyage from Cocanada, India to London.

== 26 June ==
List of shipwrecks: 26 June 1870
Ship	State	Description
Aid	United Kingdom	The cutter was driven ashore and wrecked in Richmond Bay, Tobago.
August	Hamburg	The barque was wrecked on a reef off Anegada, Virgin Islands. She was a voyage from Hamburg to Saint Thomas, Virgin Islands.

== 27 June ==
List of shipwrecks: 27 June 1870
Ship	State	Description
Alexandra	United Kingdom	The steamboat ran aground and broke in two at Lytham St. Annes, Lancashire. She was on a voyage from Lytham St. Annes to Blackpool.
Eleven, or Ellen	United Kingdom	The schooner collided with the steamship Bravo (United Kingdom) and sank in the North Sea off Whitby, Yorkshire. Her crew were rescued. She was on a voyage from Wisbech, Cambridgeshire to Middlesbrough, Yorkshire.
Jane	New Zealand	The 37-ton schooner sank off Chamberlin's Island during a gale, with the loss of one life. An inquiry ruled that the boat had been overladen.
Maria	Netherlands	The ship struck the pier at Harlingen, Friesland and was damaged. She was on a voyage from Riga, Russia to Harlingen. She was taken in to Harlingen in a severely leaky condition.
Young America	New Zealand	The schooner was driven ashore close to the mouth of the Wairau River during a gale, and became a wreck.

== 28 June ==
List of shipwrecks: 28 June 1870
Ship	State	Description
Archibald	United Kingdom	The barque was wrecked on the Shantung Promontory, China. Her crew were rescued. She was on a voyage from Foo Chow Foo to Chefoo, China.
Burgos	United Kingdom	The steamship was driven ashore in the Gironde.

== 29 June ==
List of shipwrecks: 29 June 1870
Ship	State	Description
Anglia	United Kingdom	The steamship ran aground in the River Clyde near Renfrew. She was refloated the next day and taken in to Glasgow, Renfrewshire.
Claremount	United Kingdom	The steamship ran aground in the New Cut, in the Danube.
Maria	United Kingdom	The ship ran aground in the Old Cut, in the Danube.
Palmyra	United Kingdom	The steamship ran aground at Havre de Grâce, Seine-Inférieure. She was on a voyage from Liverpool, Lancashire to Havre de Grâce.
Rosetta	Italy	The ship ran aground in the Old Cut.
St. Lawrence	France	The full-rigged ship was severely damaged by fire at New Orleans, Louisiana, United States. She was on a voyage from New Orleans to Havre de Grâce, Seine-Inférieure.

== 30 June ==
List of shipwrecks: 30 June 1870
Ship	State	Description
Hendricka	Netherlands	The barque foundered off Cape Agulhas, Cape Colony.
Sandsend	United Kingdom	The steamship was driven ashore near the Sagelskar Tower, Russia. She was on a voyage from West Hartlepool, County Durham to Kronstadt, Russia. She was refloated and taken in to Kronstadt.
Perseverance	United Kingdom	The ship sprang a leak and foundered off Hartlepool, County Durham. Her crew were rescued by the brig Luna ( Danzig). Perseverance was on a voyage from Middlesbrough, Yorkshire to South Shields, County Durham.

== Unknown date ==
List of shipwrecks: Unknown date in June 1870
Ship	State	Description
Aios Giorgios	Greece	The ship collided with Europa (Flag unknown) and sank off Andros. She was on a voyage from the Black Sea to Marseille, Bouches-du-Rhône, France.
Alecto	United Kingdom	The ship was wrecked on Cape Sable Island, Nova Scotia, Canada. She was on a voyage from Liverpool, Lancashire to Halifax, Nova Scotia.
Alert	Norway	The ship was wrecked on Farø, Denmark.
Almira	United Kingdom	The ship ran aground at Liverpool. She was refloated.
America	United Kingdom	The ship was driven ashore near Dungeness, Kent. She was on a voyage from South Shields, County Durham to Cartagena, Spain.
Andes	United Kingdom	The ship was lost before 6 June. She was on a voyage from Sumatra, Netherlands East Indies to Penang, Straits Settlements.
Artemisa	United Kingdom	The ship ran aground off Ereikoussa, Greece.
Auguste Robert	Denmark	The schooner collided with SMS Friedrich Carl (Prussian Navy) and was abandoned in the Dogger Bank. Her crew were rescued by Dutch fishermen. Auguste Robert was on a voyage from Hartlepool County Durham to Trieste.
Aurora	United Kingdom	The ship was destroyed by fire off Bombay, India.
Buena Vista	United States	The vessel was lost in the Gulf of Alaska.
Canopus	United Kingdom	The ship ran aground at Southend, Essex. She was refloated.
Caroline	United Kingdom	The ship was lost in the White Sea. Her crew were rescued.
Clitus	United Kingdom	The ship struck rocks at Ardrossan, Ayrshire and sprang a leak.
Colonist	United Kingdom	The barque sank at Richibucto, New Brunswick, Canada before 15 June.
Commerce	United Kingdom	The ship was driven ashore at Domesnes, Courland Governorate. She was consequently condemned.
Constant	United States	The ship was wrecked on the Caicos Reef. She was on a voyage from New York to Port-au-Prince, Haiti.
County of Lancaster	United Kingdom	The ship ran aground off Batavia, Netherlands East Indies before 25 June. She was on a voyage from Glasgow to Batavia. She was refloated and taken in to Batavia.
Don de Dieu	France	The ship was driven ashore on Saaremaa, Russia. Her crew were rescued.
Edward Curtin	United States	The ship was abandoned off Cape Hatteras, North Carolina. She was on a voyage from Barbados to New York.
Elizabeth	United Kingdom	The ship struck the Carenon Rock. She was on a voyage from a Welsh port to Hull, Yorkshire.
Fanny Kischner	Netherlands	The ship was wrecked in the Gaspar Strait. She was on a voyage from the Persian Gulf to Batavia.
Goldhunter	United Kingdom	The brigantine was driven ashore on Mew Island, County Down. She was on a voyage from Maryport, Cumberland to Belfast, County Antrim.
Heinrich	Flag unknown	The ship was struck by a tornado and ran aground in the Benin River before 27 June. She was refloated and found to be leaky.
Henrietta	United Kingdom	The ship ran aground at the mouth of the Rio Grande do Norte. She was on a voyage from Pernambuco, Brazil to the Rio Grande do Norte.
Howard	United States	The ship ran aground on Harding's Rock. She was on a voyage from the Turks Islands to Boston, Massachusetts.
Italia	Italy	The ship was driven ashore at Anjer, Netherlands East Indies with the loss of several lives. She was on a voyage from Maceió, Brazil to Anjer. She subsequently broke up.
London	United Kingdom	The ship ran aground. She was on a voyage from Newcastle upon Tyne, Northumberland to Kronstadt, Russia. She was refloated and resumed her voyage.
L'Orient	France	The steamship was lost near Ambriz, Portuguese West Africa.
Louisiana	France	The steamship ran aground near Port-Louis, Morbihan and was severely damaged.
Mabruca	(Ottoman Empire) Egypt	The ship was driven ashore and wrecked between Damietta and Alexandria.
Mameluke	United States	The ship was wrecked in Scammon's Lagoon.
Margarita	Hamburg	The ship ran aground at the mouth of the Orinoco River. She was on a voyage from Hamburg to Ciudad Bolívar, Venezuela.
Mary Maria	United Kingdom	The ship was driven ashore and wrecked at Salinas, Puerto Rico. She was on a voyage from Arroyo to Salinas.
Medora	United Kingdom	The ship was driven ashore 5 nautical miles (9.3 km) east of Penzance, Cornwall. She was on a voyage from Penzance to Quebec City.
Orient	United Kingdom	The ship foundered in the Atlantic Ocean. Her crew were rescued. She was on a voyage from Haiti to Derry.
Orion	United Kingdom	The ship was driven ashore near Hela, Prussia. She was on a voyage from Danzig to Cardiff, Glamorgan.
Oscar	Denmark	The ship was driven ashore on Læsø. She was on a voyage from Newcastle upon Tyne to Aalborg. She was refloated and taken in to Fredrikshavn.
Palace	United Kingdom	The ship was driven ashore near Galveston, Texas, United States. She was on a voyage from Liverpool to Galveston. She had been refloated by 10 June and taken in to Galveston.
Queen of the West	United Kingdom	The ship foundered off Ouessant, Finistère, France.
Scandinavian	Norway	The ship was wrecked on St. Paul's Island, Nova Scotia. She was on a voyage from Dram to Quebec City.
Scio	(Canada)	The ship was driven ashore on Brier Island, Nova Scotia. She was on a voyage from Saint John, New Brunswick to Havana, Cuba.
Soucharp	Flag unknown	The steamship ran aground at Sulina, Ottoman Empire. She was refloated and resumed her voyage.
St. Austel	United Kingdom	The ship was driven ashore at Port Alfred, Cape Colony. She was on a voyage from Mauritius to Port Alfred.
St. Francis	France	The ship was wrecked on the coast of Haiti.
Sultana	United Kingdom	The ship was driven ashore on White Island. She was on a voyage from Jersey, Channel Islands to Quebec City.
Summer Cloud	United Kingdom	The ship was driven ashore near "Audumi".
Tennessee	United States	The steamship caught fire and was beached near the mouth of the Cape Fear River. She was on a voyage from Charleston, South Carolina to New York. She was a total loss.
Thomas Miskimmons	United States	The ship was wrecked in Man of War's Bay. She was on a voyage from Charleston, South Carolina to Caibarién, Cuba.
Trincelo	United Kingdom	The ship was driven ashore near Pärnu, Russia. She was refloated the next day.
Verseny	United Kingdom	The steamship ran aground and was damaged. She was on a voyage from Liverpool to Galaţi, Ottoman Empire.
