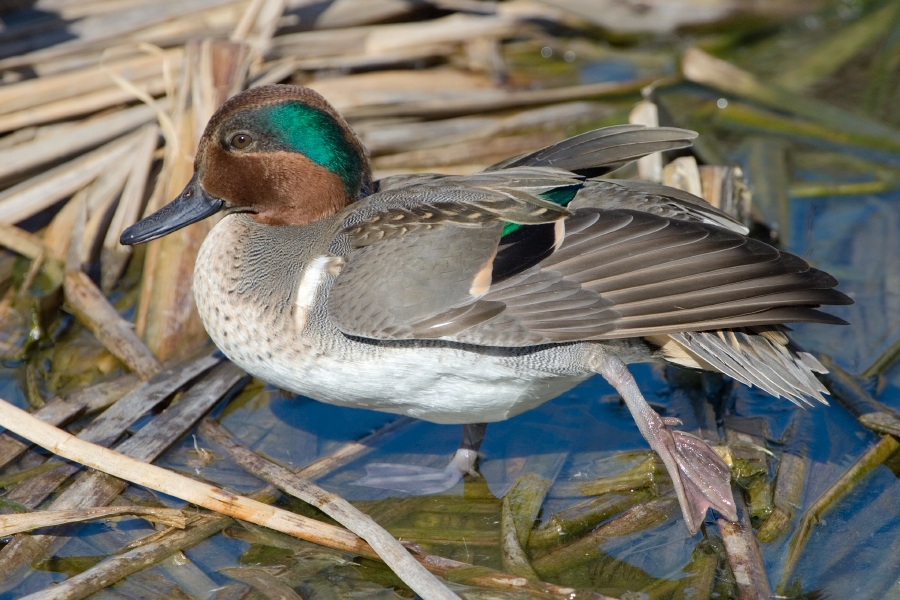
- Male
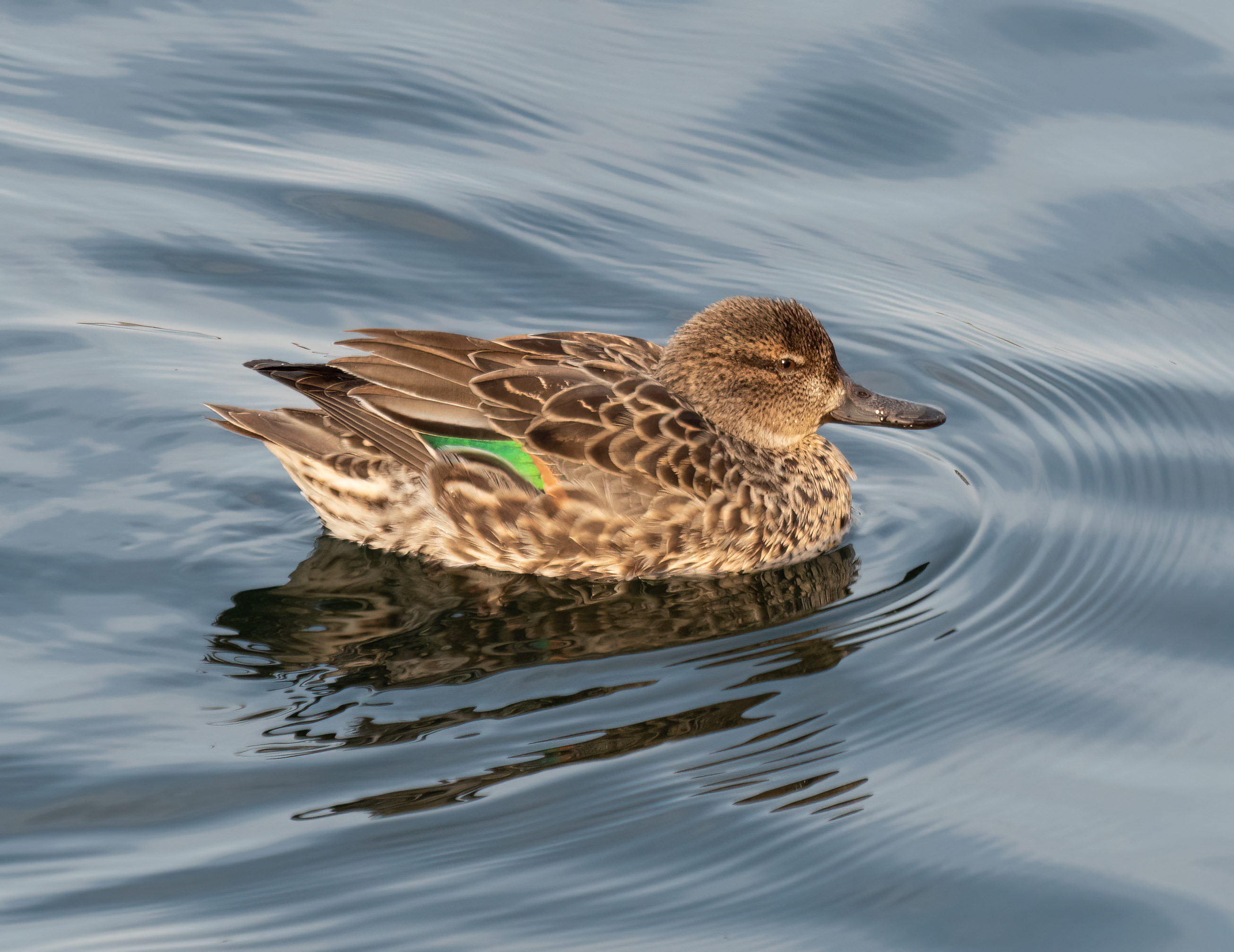
- Female

Conservation status
- Least Concern (IUCN 3.1)

Scientific classification
- Kingdom: Animalia
- Phylum: Chordata
- Class: Aves
- Order: Anseriformes
- Family: Anatidae
- Genus: Anas
- Species: A. carolinensis

Binomial name
- Anas carolinensis Gmelin, 1789
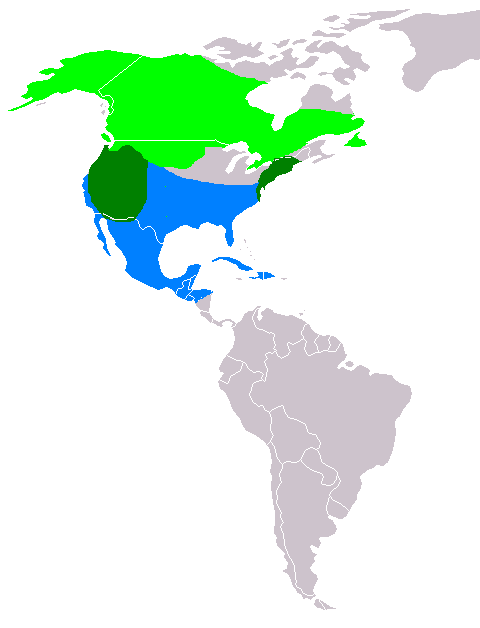
- Nesting range Year-round range Wintering range

Synonyms
- Anas crecca carolinensis Nettion carolinensis

= Green-winged teal =

Species of bird

The green-winged teal (Anas carolinensis) or American teal is a common and widespread duck that breeds in the northern areas of North America except on the Aleutian Islands. It was considered conspecific with the Eurasian teal (A. crecca) for some time, but the two have since been split into separate species. The American Ornithological Society continues to debate this determination; however, nearly all other authorities consider it distinct based on behavioral, morphological, and molecular evidence. The scientific name is from Latin Anas, "duck" and carolinensis, "of Carolina".

This dabbling duck is strongly migratory and winters far south of its breeding range. It is highly gregarious outside of the breeding season and will form large flocks. In flight, the fast, twisting flocks resemble waders.

== Taxonomy ==
The green-winged teal was formally described in 1789 by the German naturalist Johann Friedrich Gmelin in his revised and expanded edition of Carl Linnaeus's Systema Naturae. He placed it with the other ducks, geese and swans in the genus Anas and coined the binomial name Anas carolinensis. Gmelin based his description on the "American teal" that had been described in 1785 by John Latham in his A General Synopsis of Birds and in the same year by Thomas Pennant in his Arctic Zoology . The genus name Anas is Latin for "duck". The specific epithet carolinensis means "of Carolina". The species is monotypic, with no subspecies accepted. Some authorities treat the green-winged teal as a subspecies of the Eurasian teal (Anas crecca); when lumped, the merged species is known as common teal.

== Description ==
This is the smallest North American dabbling duck. The breeding male has finely barred gray flanks and back, with pale yellow under the tail at the rear end, and a white-edged green speculum, obvious in flight or at rest. It has a chestnut head with a green eye patch. It is distinguished from drake Eurasian teal (the Eurasian relative of this bird) by a vertical white stripe on side of breast, the lack of a horizontal white scapular stripe, and thinner or even no buff lines between the green and brown pattern on its head.

The females are light brown, with plumage much like a female mallard. They can be distinguished from most ducks on size, shape, and the speculum. Separation from female Eurasian teal is problematic.

In non-breeding (eclipse) plumage, the drake looks like the female, but slightly darker and duller, and with a weaker eyestripe.

It is a common duck of sheltered wetlands, such as taiga bogs, and usually feeds by dabbling for plant food or grazing. It nests on the ground, near water and under cover. While its conservation status is not evaluated by IUCN at present due to non-recognition of the taxon at species rank, it is plentiful enough to make it a species of Least Concern if it were; it is far more plentiful than the Eurasian teal. It can be seen in vast numbers in the Marismas Nacionales-San Blas mangroves of western Mexico, a main wintering area.

This is a noisy species. The male has a clear whistle, whereas the female has a feeble quack.

Measurements:

- Length: 31–39 cm (12.2–15.4 in)
- Wingspan: 52–59 cm (20.5–23.2 in)
- Weight: 140–500 g (4.9–17.6 oz)

== Distribution and habitat ==
Flock of green winged teals

The American green-winged teal breeds from the Aleutian Islands, northern Alaska, Mackenzie River delta, northern Saskatchewan, Manitoba, Ontario, Quebec, and Labrador south to central California, central Nebraska, central Kansas, southern Minnesota, Wisconsin, Ontario, Quebec, Newfoundland, and the Maritime Provinces. It winters from southern Alaska and southern British Columbia east to New Brunswick and Nova Scotia and south to Central America. It also winters in Hawaii. Though less commonly seen, there are multiple photographic records from countries in northern South America, such as Venezuela, Colombia, and Ecuador. It is also a regular vagrant in western Europe (e.g. several every winter in Great Britain) and Morocco in northwest Africa, and has also occurred more rarely in northeast Asia south to Japan.

Green-winged teal are abundant in wetlands of the Canadian parkland and northern boreal forest associations. They occur more often in mixed-prairie associations than in shortgrass associations. They also inhabit arctic tundra and semidesert communities. Within the above associations, green-winged teal commonly inhabit wetland communities dominated by bulrushes (Scirpus spp.), cattails (Typha spp.), sedges (Carex spp.), pondweeds (Potamogeton spp.) and other emergent and aquatic vegetation. Green-winged teal frequently nest in grasses, sedge meadows, or on dry hillsides having brush or aspen (Populus spp.) cover. Near Brooks, Alberta, green-winged teal nests were found most often in beds of rushes (Juncus spp.), and in western Montana most nests were located under greasewood (Sarcobatus spp.).

Green-winged teal inhabit inland lakes, marshes, ponds, pools, and shallow streams with dense emergent and aquatic vegetation. They prefer shallow waters and small ponds and pools during the breeding season. They are often found resting on mudbanks or stumps, or perching on low limbs of dead trees. These ducks nest in depressions on dry ground located at the base of shrubs, under a log, or in dense grass. The nests are usually 1 to 100 m (3 to 328 ft) from water, but they avoid treeless or brushless habitats. Green-winged teal winter in both freshwater or brackish marshes, ponds, streams, and estuaries. As they are smaller birds, they tend to stay in the calmer water.

In northern areas of the United States, green-winged teal migrating to wintering grounds appear in early September through mid-December. They begin migrating into most central regions during September and often remain through December. On their more southerly winter areas, they arrive as early as late September, but most do not appear until late November.

== Behavior and ecology ==
=== Breeding ===
Green-winged teal are among the earliest spring migrants. They arrive on nesting areas almost as soon as the snow melts. In early February, green-winged teal begin to depart their winter grounds, and continue through April. In central regions green-winged teal begin to arrive early in March with peak numbers in early April. Nesting chronology varies geographically. In North Dakota, green-winged teal generally begin nesting in late April. In the Northwest Territories, Canada, green-winged teal begin nesting between late May and early July. At Minto Lakes, Alaska, green-winged teal initiate nesting as early as 1 June and as late as 20 July.

They become sexually mature after their first winter. The nest is usually concealed both from the side and from above in heavy grass, weeds, or brushy cover. Cattails, bulrushes, smartweeds (Polygonum spp.), and other emergent vegetation provide hiding cover for ducks on water. The clutch size ranges from 5 to 16 eggs. The incubation period is 21 to 23 days. The eggs are white to pale olive in color and measure 4.3–5 cm (1.7–2.0 in) in length and 3.2–3.5 cm (1.3–1.4 in) in width. The young fledge 34 to 35 days after hatching or usually before 6 weeks of age. Young green-winged teal have the fastest growth rate of all ducks.

The males leave the females at the start of incubation and congregate on safe waters to molt. Some populations undergo an extensive molt migration while others remain on or near breeding grounds. Females molt on breeding grounds.

=== Food and feeding ===
Green-winged teal, more than any other species of duck, prefer to seek food on mud flats. Where mud flats are lacking, they prefer shallow marshes or temporarily flooded agricultural lands. They usually eat vegetative matter consisting of seeds, stems, and leaves of aquatic and emergent vegetation. Green-winged teal appear to prefer the small seeds of nutgrasses (Cyperus spp.), millets (Panicum spp.), and sedges to larger seeds, but they also consume corn, wheat, barley, and buttonbush (Cephalanthus spp.) seeds. In marshes, sloughs, and ponds, green-winged teal select the seeds of bulrushes, pondweeds, and spikerushes (Eleocharis spp.). To a lesser extent they feed upon the vegetative parts of muskgrass (Chara spp.), pondweeds, widgeongrass (Ruppia maritima), and duckweeds (Lemna spp.). They will occasionally eat insects, mollusks, and crustaceans. Sometimes during spring months, green-winged teal will gorge on maggots of decaying fish which are found around ponds.

== Predators ==
Common predators of green-winged teal include humans, skunks (Mephitis and Spilogale spp.), red foxes (Vulpes vulpes), raccoons (Procyon lotor), crows, and magpies (Pica spp.).

== Relationships ==
mtDNA data-wise, this species is more closely related to the speckled teal than to the Eurasian teal. This would require that sexual dimorphism either was lost in the speckled teal or that it evolved in near-identical forms in the green-winged and Eurasian teal after the divergence of the green-winged and speckled teal lineages.

Both hypotheses seem rather spurious initially, with the green-winged teal and Eurasian teal's male nuptial plumage being unique and very complex, and the tendency to gain, not lose, strong sexual dimorphism overwhelming in the dabbling ducks. An alternative explanation given the high frequency of hybridization in ducks would be that the mtDNA of the present-day green-winged teal is originally derived from spotted teal females by introgression and thus the molecular data gives a misleading picture of the species' true relationships. This is supported by the observation that in mallard × American black duck hybrids, females of both taxa prefer the sexually dimorphic mallard drakes over the dull-plumaged black duck drakes; that the green-winged teal is in some aspects—such as the less contrasting nuptial plumage—intermediate between the common and speckled teal is also interesting to note.

Alternatively, the Eurasian teal might be derived from the green-winged teal, with the molecular difference being due to genetic drift or a founder effect in the latter and possibly speckled teal introgression in the former. The three teals certainly belong to a superspecies in the teals ("Nettion"); the ancestors of this group were most likely sexually monomorphic Southern Hemisphere forms (Johnson & Sorenson, 1999; note that their "African" distribution includes Bernier's teal taxa which like many Madagascar taxa is of Indo-Australian origin).

Another possibility is that the American lineage is derived from stray Eurasian teals, with the founder effect/genetic drift and/or hybrid introgression phenomena applying as above, only in the reverse direction for the former two. Still, this would require loss of sexual dimorphism in the ancestors of the speckled teal, but while extremely rare in dabbling ducks, it is not per se impossible.

The close relationship of speckled and green-winged teals suggested by mtDNA data could of course still apply to the taxa in general, not just to sequences in two maternally inherited genes in a few individual ducks (for which it without doubt does apply), but the overall failure of Johnson & Sorenson to seriously take hybridization into account and their small sample sizes and obsolete conceptions of Indian Ocean biogeography do not help at all to resolve the issue, but in 1999, the methodology and interpretation were reasonable enough and in fact, the study was pioneering in many respects due to dense taxon-level sampling and still represents one of the default references for interpreting the phylogeny of the genus.

The post-copulatory displays of the common and green-winged teal are identical, but those of the speckled teal have some additional elements.

A firm conclusion cannot be reached at present beyond a tentative rejection of the phylogeny suggested by the mtDNA data. Nuclear DNA sequence information is required, but may not be sufficient, to resolve the puzzling relationships in the crecca-carolinensis-flavirostris complex of teals.
