= Sylvanus William Godon =

American naval officer

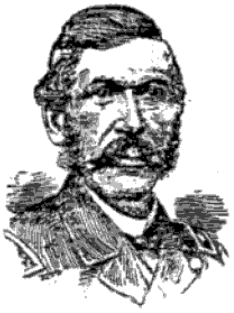
- Born: June 18, 1809; Philadelphia, Pennsylvania, U.S.
- Died: May 17, 1879 (aged 69); Blois, France
- Burial place: Laurel Hill Cemetery, Philadelphia, Pennsylvania, U.S.
- Military career
- Allegiance: United States
- Branch: United States Navy
- Service years: 1819–1871
- Rank: Rear Admiral
- Commands: USS Vesuvius; USS Mohican; USS Susquehanna; Brazil Squadron; Brooklyn Navy Yard
- Conflicts: Mexican–American War; Siege of Veracruz; American Civil War; Battle of Port Royal; First Battle of Fort Fisher; Second Battle of Fort Fisher

Sylvanus William Godon (June 18, 1809 – May 17, 1879) was an American naval officer who served in the Mexican–American and American Civil War.

Born in Philadelphia, Pennsylvania, Godon entered the United States Navy in 1819 as a midshipman. He joined the Navy at an early age as a way to receive an education after his father, a noted French mineralogist, went insane and became destitute. He served at sea in various parts of the world and was promoted passed midshipman in 1827, and to lieutenant on December 17, 1836.

He served on the Ohio as flag lieutenant to Commodore Isaac Hull of the Mediterranean Squadron from 1839 to 1841. Godon was accused of insubordination by Hull and sent back to the Navy Department for reassignment. He was found guilty of disobedience of orders and neglect of duty and sentenced to two years suspension from duty but the conviction was reversed by the Secretary of the Navy and no punishment occurred. Godon served during the Mexican–American War and commanded the bomb vessel Vesuvius at the Siege of Veracruz in 1847.

He was made commander on September 14, 1855. In 1860 Godon, in command of the steam sloop of war Mohican, was assigned to the Africa Squadron. On August 8, 1860, he captured the slaver Erie, commanded by Nathaniel Gordon, off the mouth of the Congo River and forced that ship to unload its captive cargo at Monrovia, Liberia. He remained on station until sailing for home on August 13, 1861. Nathaniel Gordon would become the first and only slave trader to be tried, convicted, and executed under the Piracy Law of 1820, which made it a capital offense for Americans to actively participate in the slave trade.

Promoted to captain effective July 16, 1862, he took part in the Battle of Port Royal under Admiral Samuel Francis Du Pont. Although not part of Du Pont's plan, he placed Mohican in position to secure an enfilading fire on Fort Walker on Hilton Head Island, South Carolina, and materially assisted in silencing the batteries of the enemy. In 1863 he was promoted to commodore; and commanded the 4th Division of Admiral David Dixon Porter's fleet at the first and second battles of Fort Fisher, North Carolina, in December 1864 and January 1865. In the report of the latter action he was specially commended for the support rendered the commander-in-chief, and for the good discipline and accurate firing of his ship, the Susquehanna.

At the close of the war he was made rear admiral, and commanded the South Atlantic or Brazil Squadron in 1866-1867. His last active employment was as commandant of the Brooklyn Navy Yard from May 1, 1868, until October 15, 1870. He retired from the Navy on June 18, 1871. Godon died on May 17, 1879 at his ancestral home in Blois, France. He was buried in Laurel Hill Cemetery, Section F, Lot 14, Philadelphia.
