= Marismas Nacionales–San Blas mangroves =

Mangrove ecoregion of the Pacific coast of Mexico

Marismas Nacionales-San Blas mangroves
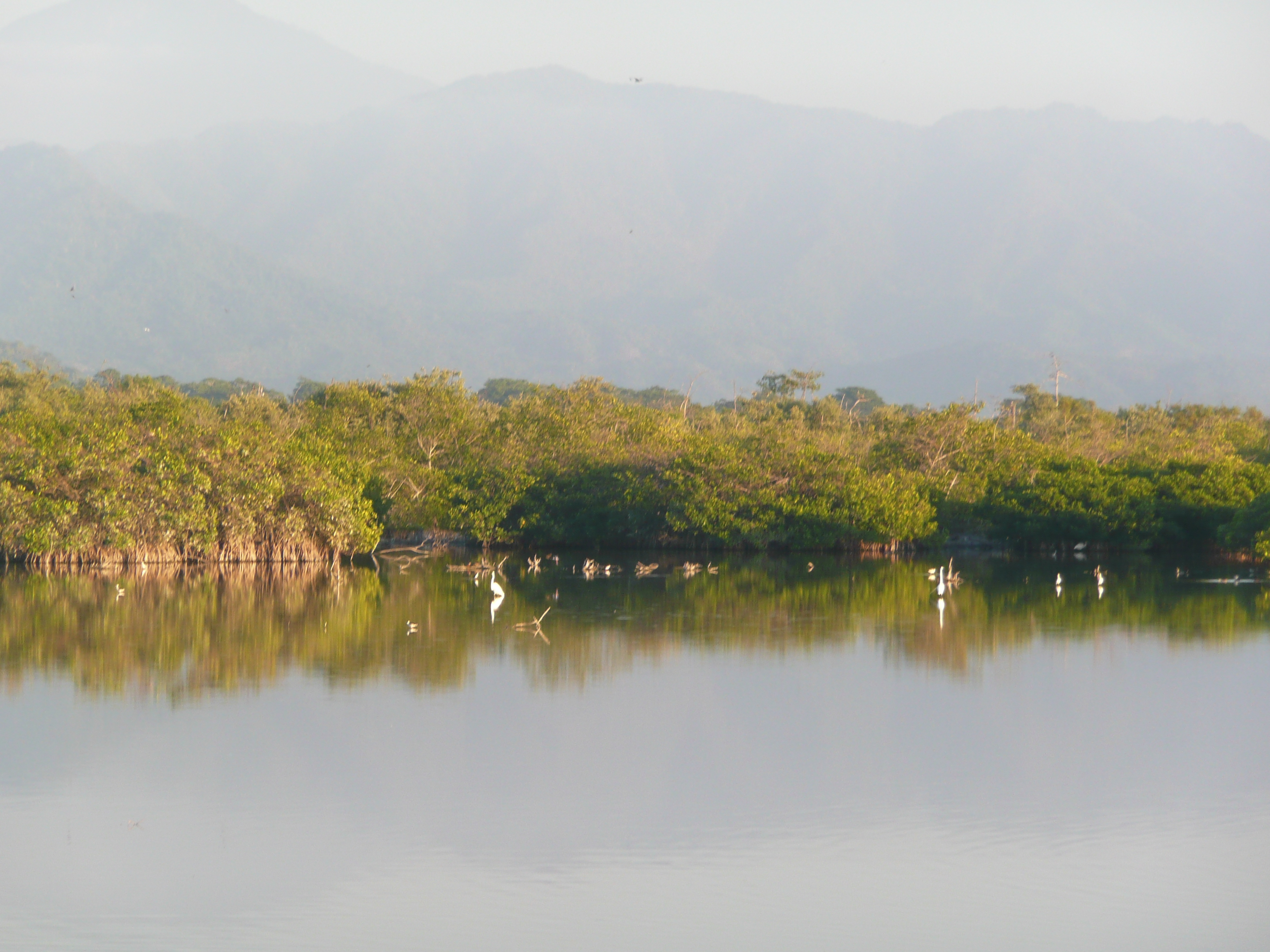
- La Tovara Nature Reserve, San Blas, Nayarit, Mexico

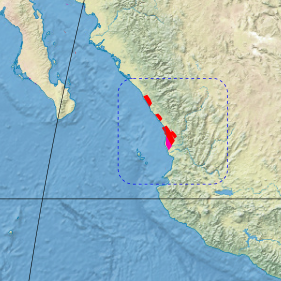
- Ecoregion territory (in red)

Ecology
- Realm: Neotropical
- Biome: Mangroves
- Borders: Sinaloan dry forests

Geography
- Area: 2,100 km^{2} (810 sq mi)
- Country: Mexico
- States: Sinaloa; Nayarit

Conservation
- Conservation status: Critical/endangered

Designations

Ramsar Wetland
- Official name: Marismas Nacionales
- Designated: 22 June 1995
- Reference no.: 732

Marismas Nacionales–San Blas mangroves is a mangrove ecoregion of the Pacific coast of Mexico. The marismas nacionales ("national marshes") stretches from Mazatlán, Sinaloa southwards to San Blas, Nayarit.

== Geography ==
The Marismas Nacionales–San Blas mangroves occupy an area of 2,000 square kilometers (770 sq mi) in coastal Nayarit and Sinaloa states.

The Marismas Nacionales is an interconnected complex of lagoons and wetlands on the alluvial plain formed by the Acaponeta, San Pedro Mezquital, and Grande de Santiago rivers. Beach ridges separate the wetlands from the sea. The central Agua Brava Lagoon and northern Teacapán Lagoon are the principal lagoons. The San Blas mangroves are the southernmost in the complex, located south of the Grande de Santiago river mouth.

Other mangrove areas north of the Marismas Nacionales complex include the Presidio River delta, the Baluarte River delta, and the Urías estuary south of Mazatlan.

== Flora ==
Red mangrove (Rhizophora mangle), black mangrove (Avicennia germinans), white mangrove (Laguncularia racemosa), and button mangrove (Conocarpus erectus) are found in the ecoregion. Black mangrove is predominant near Teacapán in the northern part of the ecoregion, and white mangrove is predominant near Agua Brava in the southern part of the ecoregion. Trees that grow in association with the mangroves include ciruelillo (Phyllanthus elsiae), zapotón (Pachira aquatica), and anona (Annona glabra).

== Fauna ==
The mangroves are home to over 250 species of birds, and serve as an important winter habitat for migratory birds. The Marismas Nacionales Biosphere Reserve also support an important number of mammal species, like deer, jaguar, ocelot and lynx.

== Conservation and threats ==
Since 2009, Fonatur (Fondo Nacional de Fomento al Turismo), the Mexican tourism investment office, is planning a large tourism development adjacent to Marismas Nacionales that will include over 43,000 hotel and vacation home rooms, at least three golf courses, two marinas, commercial centers, and general urbanization. The direct and indirect impacts of this development, including the city that will be created nearby to house the workers servicing the tourism lodging and attractions, pose a substantial threat to the conservation of the Marismas Nacionales-San Blas Mangroves.

== See also ==
- List of ecoregions in Mexico
