= Battle of Boca Teacapan =

1870 U.S. Navy action against Mexican pirates

- Part of Piracy in North America
- Boca Teacapan from the Teacapan Estuary.
Date	June 17, 1870
Location	Boca Teacapan, Sinaloa, Teacapan Estuary
Result	American victory

Belligerents
United States	(Mexico) Mexican Pirates

Commanders and leaders
Willard H. Brownson; Jonathan Wainwright †	Plácido Vega Daza

Strength
Land: ≈25 marines ≈50 sailors River: 6 armed boats	Land: ≈160 pirates 4 artillery pieces 1 shore battery River: 1 steamer

Casualties and losses
2 killed 8 wounded 3 armed boats damaged	6–8 captured 1 steamer captured

The Battle of Boca Teacapan was the result of a United States Navy expedition to destroy a Mexican pirate ship which was attacking targets in the Pacific Ocean. United States sailors and marines in several small boats pursued the pirates to the Boca Teacapan, in Sinaloa, and up the Teacapan Estuary for 42 mi (68 km) over several days in 1870 before defeating them at their hideout. The battle ended with the destruction of the pirate ship.

== Background ==
In the Pacific Ocean, piracy continued into the 1870s off the coasts of both Asia and North America. In the summer of 1870, the Mexican pirate gunboat Forward, with about 120 to 200 men of several nationalities, was attacking primarily Mexican and American shipping off Sinaloa. Pirates of Forward had also attacked Guaymas in June 1870. They occupied the customs house and then robbed the foreign residents. The pirates then forced the United States consulate in Guaymas to supply the steamer with 200 pounds of coal. These attacks led to the involvement of the Pacific Squadron. In May 1870 USS Mohican was newly assigned to the station and sent to destroy the pirate threat off Mazatlan. On June 15 about seventy-five United States marines and sailors in one launch armed with a howitzer and five boats rigged as cutters were sent on an expedition to find the Forward.

American forces under Executive Officer Lieutenant Willard H. Brownson proceeded along the coast from Mazatlan to San Blas and arrived the following day. There the force discovered that the pirates had steamed a day or so earlier into the Teacapan River (Teacapan Estuary) for the village of Boca Teacapan; the Americans sailed further in pursuit. When the Americans reached the river, they stopped their boats at the mouth and prepared for battle. Master Jonathan Mayhew Wainwright III was a professional sailor among the party, whose father Jonathan Mayhew Wainwright II and brother Robert Powell Page Wainwright both served the United States military with distinction. Lieutenant Brownson commanded the launch, while Wainwright and four other masters commanded the other boats.

== Battle ==
When the preparations for combat were completed, Lieutenant Brownson ordered his men up the river at around 9:00 AM on June 17. After another forty-two miles, the Americans came within sight of a small boat and the Forward, which had run aground on a shoal at the left bank of the river. The small boat was apparently being used for scouting as it immediately began to flee upon sighting the approaching Americans. Before the boat got far, the United States Navy cutters captured her, with six to eight pirates. With only a few minutes of daylight left, Brownson ordered an attack on the Forward. Master Wainwright's boat and another were ordered to capture the steamer while Brownson in the launch provided covering fire with the howitzer. One other boat was used for the wounded and the two remaining were left as reserves. The armed launch opened fire on the Forward, and the boarding party advanced. It was around 9:00 PM and dark by the time Master Wainwright and his men reached the sides of the steamer.

Armed with cutlasses, rifles and pistols, the Americans boarded the vessel without resistance. Half of the boarding party was on Forward's deck when the pirates fired their first shots. Three volleys from the left side of the river were let loose at a range of fifty yards, then rifle and musket fire from the right bank began. Initially shocked, the Americans aboard the pirate steamer scrambled and then an artillery battery of four field pieces opened up. Cannon shot hit Wainwright's boat first which hurt the master and severely damaged the craft. Wainwright was badly wounded in the chest and the right arm but continued to direct his men to fire on the left bank where sniper fire had originated from. A coxwain of the same boat was lost as well when he was hit in the head with shrapnel, killing him instantly. Three other men of Wainwright's cutter were wounded. The boarding party returned fire and Lieutenant Brownson maneuvered his launch upstream and redirected his shot on the battery 150 yards up the river. Brownson started his bombardment of the battery while the men of the other boats sailed around the river, shooting at the Mexicans on shore.

Over the course of the next few minutes, the fire from the pirates gradually reduced until the battery was silenced and the sniping had ceased. It was about 9:00 pm when the fighting stopped so Brownson ordered some men ashore to secure the area while another group attempted to refloat the Forward.

== Aftermath ==
After some thirty-five minutes of combat and several hours of trying to salvage the grounded pirate steamer, the Americans decided it was best to burn her to prevent her from being retaken. Turpentine was used to saturate the vessel, then she was lit and burnt. Three howitzer rounds were also fired into Forward's hull, to help her sink. At 2:00 pm on June 18, Brownson and his men returned to the Mohican. From there they sailed to Panama. Accounts of the Mexican forces involved differ: official reports say about 120 men crewed the Forward which opposed the Americans along the Teacapan, though some of the United States sailors and marines claimed that over fifty troops under a rebel Mexican general were involved. Mexicans, Spaniards and a few Americans were found to have made up the pirate crew, of which the first and second mate were captured. Forward had on board a San Salvador flag when taken.

Master Wainwright died of his wounds received in battle on June 18, 1870. Eight Americans were wounded in total and three boats damaged. Casualties of the pirates are unknown. Jonathan Mayhew Wainwright IV was named after Master Wainwright and later became a four-star general during World War II. Lieutenant Brownson later became an admiral in the United States Navy and fought in the Spanish–American War.

== See also ==
- Golden Age of Piracy
- Battle of Anton Lizardo
- Battle of Kuhlan
