= Agua Grande =

Agua Grande May refer to:

- Agua Grande Lagoon in Sinaloa, Mexico
- Água Grande District on São Tomé Island in São Tomé and Príncipe
