= Plácido Vega y Daza =

Mexican military officer and politician (1830–1878)

Don Plácido Vega y Daza General de División del Ejército Mexicano
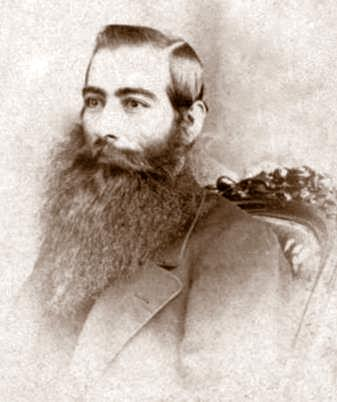
- Portrait of Vega y Daza by Bradley & Rulofson

Governor of Sinaloa
- In office 1 January 1862 – 25 January 1862
- Preceded by: Manuel Márquez de León
- Succeeded by: Fortino León
- In office 19 August 1860 – 17 November 1861
- Preceded by: Fortino León
- Succeeded by: Manuel Márquez León
- In office 4 June 1859 – 20 April 1860
- Preceded by: Ignacio Pesqueira
- Succeeded by: Francisco de Paula Maldonado

Personal details
- Born: 1830 El Fuerte, Estado de Occidente, Mexico
- Died: 4 January 1878 (aged 47–48) Acapulco, Guerrero, Mexico
- Party: Liberal Party
- Occupation: Military officer; politician

Military service
- Allegiance: Mexico
- Branch/service: Mexican Army
- Rank: Division General
- Battles/wars: Revolution of Ayutla; Reform War; Second Franco–Mexican War; Battle of San Lorenzo; Battle of Boca Teacapan

Don Plácido de la Vega Daza y Colón de Portugal (1830 – 4 January 1878) was a Mexican general and politician. He served intermittently as Governor of Sinaloa from 1859 to 1863 and played notable roles in the Reform War and the Second French Intervention in Mexico. He is best remembered for proclaiming the Plan of El Fuerte in support of the liberal Constitution of 1857 and a controversial mission to the United States to secure arms and support for Benito Juárez's government amidst French occupation. He is sometimes referred to in Mexican historiography as El General Traicionado.

== Early life and ancestry ==
Plácido Vega y Daza was born in 1830 in El Fuerte, Sinaloa (then a single entity with Sonora known as Occidente) to Francisco Javier de la Vega y Esquer and María Dolores Daza. His ancestors included members of Spanish, Portuguese, and broader European nobility; he was a direct descendant of Cristopher Columbus' great-great-grandson, the admiral and 4th Duke of Veragua and Marquess of Jamaica, Nuño Alvares Pereira Colón de Portugal y Fernández de Córdoba, and his second wife, Luisa de Aragón y Zapata. Through them his family claimed distant connections to figures like Holy Roman Emperor Charlemagne.

His family owned significant lands, mines, and held political influence in Sinaloa after settling in the region in the 18th century. Despite this wealthy conservative background, Vega adopted liberal ideals and supported reforms aimed at reducing the power of the church and elite

== Military and political career ==
=== Revolution of Ayutla and Reform War ===
Vega y Daza first rose to prominence during the Revolution of Ayutla, organizing armed opposition in Sinaloa against the government of Antonio López de Santa Anna. After the liberals' victory, he briefly retired to private life.

He re-entered public service during the Reform War, a civil war arising from conservative opposition to the liberal Constitution of 1857. On 19 August 1858, he promulgated the Plan of El Fuerte, which defended the Constitution against the conservative Plan of Tacubaya. Collaborating with Ignacio Pesqueira, caudillo of the neighbouring state of Sonora, he helped liberate Mazatlán, the state's capital, from conservative control in April 1859, later assuming governorship and military commmandant of the state.

=== Sinaloa governorship ===
Vega y Daza served intermittently as governor of Sinaloa from 4 June 1859 to 11 January 1863. His administration faced internal challenges, including rivalries with local notables in Culiacán, foreign merchants in Mazatlán, and the Catholic Church. He clashed with Bishop Pedro Loza y Pardavé over compliance with reform laws and ordered the bishop's arrest and deportation in December 1860. He also engaged in military campaigns against the forces of regional caudillo Manuel Lozada in the Tepic region, achieving victories such as at Escuinapa and the Hills of Ixcuintla, though fighting continued.

=== French intervention in Mexico ===
Defeated in battle conservatives sough support from Napoleon III's France to effect regime change and establish a monarchy in Mexico leading to the Second French Intervention in Mexico. Vega y Daza commanded Sinaloan and Sonoran troops sent to central Mexico in support of the federal government. He served under former president, Ignacio Comonfort, aligning with broader republican efforts and participating in campaigns against French and imperial forces, notably covering the retreat of the republican forces at the Battle of San Lorenzo on 8 May 1863.

=== Secret mission to California ===
In the spring of 1864, as French forces forced Juárez's to constantly relocated his government, Vega y Daza was dispatched as a secret agent to San Francisco, California. His objectives included procuring arms, ammunition, supplies, funds, and volunteers for the republican army while navigating U.S. neutrality laws. He engaged with Mexican-American patriotic juntas. Seeking additional political influence, he became a vice-president of the Union Club of San Francisco. As an officer of the Union Club, he contributed both time and money working on Abraham Lincoln's 1864 re-election.

Vega y Daza returned to Mexico in 1866 with ships carrying armaments and volunteers. Upon arrival, he faced accusations, particularly from Minister Sebastián Lerdo de Tejada, regarding the accounting of mission funds. He defended himself in a 1867 pamphlet, Plácido Vega da Cuenta al Gobierno de la República Mejicana Sobre la Comisión que le fue Conferida al Exterior. He was briefly imprisoned in Mazatlán but escaped en route to Mexico City and sought temporary refuge in the United States.

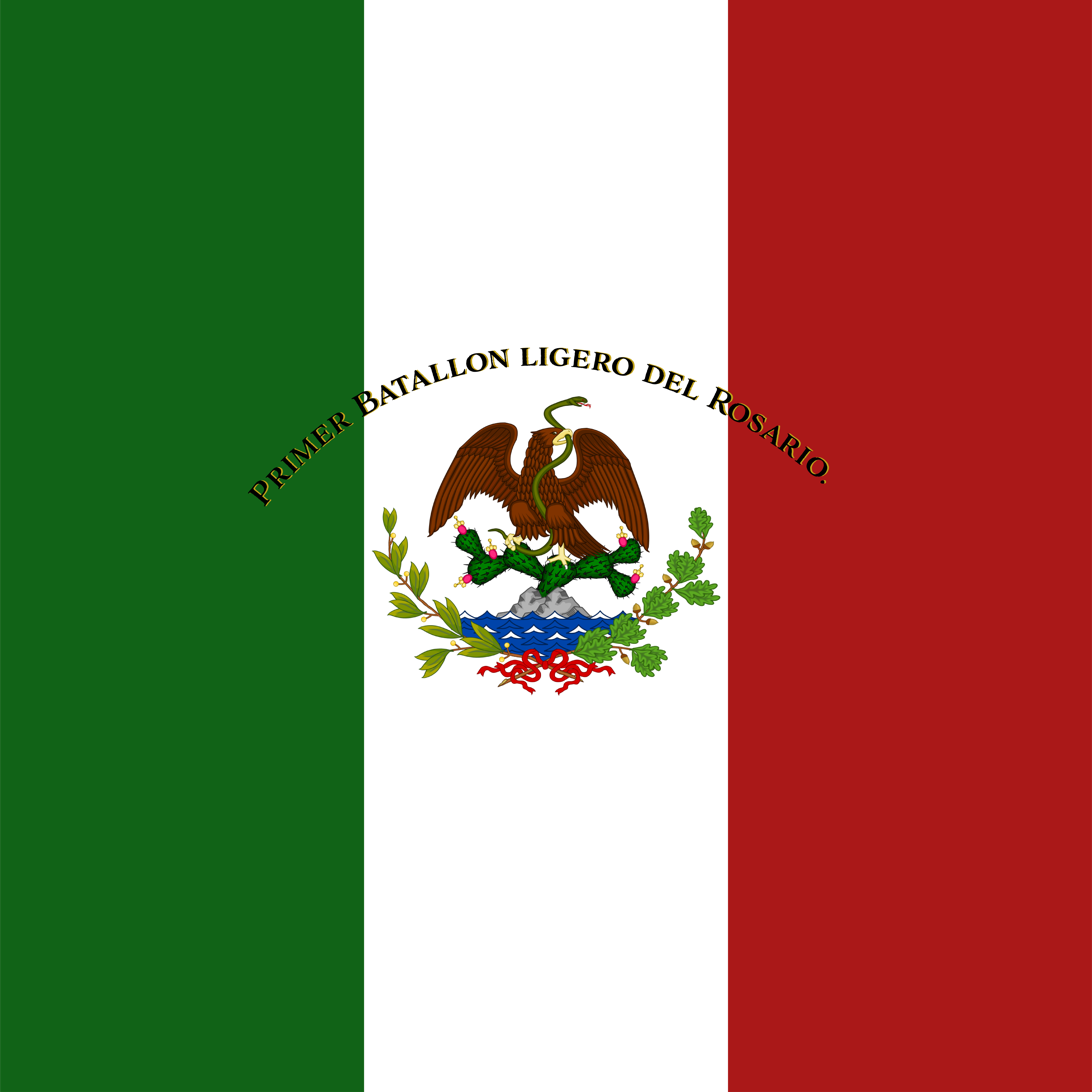
Digital reconstruction of the Mexican flag given to Plácido while he was visiting San Francisco, 1862

== Late career and death ==
In 1870, after the restoration of the Mexican Republic, Vega y Daza joined an uprising against President Juárez alongside the governor of Zacatecas, General Trinidad García de la Cadena. The movement opposed perceived centralization and sought greater regional autonomy. To fund and equip his forces, his forces seized the British-built steamer Forward. Under operational command of subordinate Fortino Vizcaíno, the vessel was repurposed for coastal raids.

The Forward conducted attacks on shipping and settlements in the Gulf of California. A notable raid occurred at Guaymas in late may 1870, where rebels looted the customshouse, extorted merchants and foreign consuls.

These actions were denounced as piracy by the Juárez government, U.S. diplomats, and affected foreign powers, prompting U.S. intervention to protect neutral shipping and interests.The U.S. Navy's sloop-of-war USS Mohican was dispatched. On 17 June 1870. They located the beached vessel at its hideout, engaged its crew in combat, and destroyed it by fire to prevent further use. The engagement became known as the Battle of Boca Teacapan.

The destruction of the Forward deprived the uprising of a key asset. The revolt ultimately failed, leading Vega y Daza to once again seek temporary refuge in the United States. He returned following Porfirio Díaz's rise to power in 1876 and died in relative obscurity on 4 January 1878 in Acapulco, Guerrero.

== Legacy ==
Plácido Vega y Daza remains a polarizing yet significant figure in Sinaloan history. The Plan of El Fuerte, promulgated by Vega y Daza on 19 August 1858 is a cornerstone of his legacy and is annually commemorated in Sinaloa.

His documented use of military marching bands during campaigns in the Reform War and French Intervention links him to the early development of Banda music. Historians note that Vega routinely included these bands to motivate troops entering combat and provide morale during rest periods. This practice is cited in regional histories as a foundational contribution to the cultural tradition that evolved into the modern day music, deeply tied to Sinaloan identity.

On broader Mexican history, critics, notably historian Eustaquio Buelna, portrayed him as authoritarian, questioned his financial management and highlighted alleged irregularities in his administration. In contrast, later rehabilitative works, such as Antonio Lerma Garay's El general traicionado: vida y obra de Plácido Vega Daza (2010), argue that Buelna and other contemporary detractors distorted or omitted facts due to personal and political rivalries. These accounts present Vega as a committed liberal patriot, skilled military organizer, and defender of the 1857 Constitution who faced betrayal after loyal service to Benito Juárez.
