= HMS Forward (1855) =

Gunboat of the Royal Navy

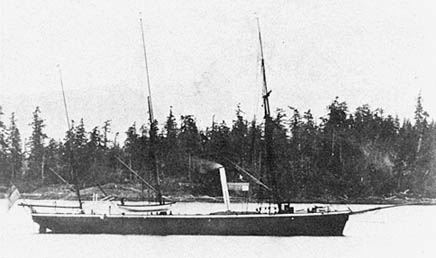

History

United Kingdom
- Name: Forward
- Builder: W & H Pitcher
- Launched: 8 December 1855
- Fate: Destroyed on 17 June 1870 in the Battle of Boca Teacapan

General characteristics (as built)
- Class & type: Albacore-class

HMS Forward was a British Albacore-class wooden screw gunboat launched in 1855 and sold in 1869. After her sale, Mexican pirates captured her, and boats from the United States Navy sloop-of-war USS Mohican destroyed her in the Battle of Boca Teacapan in 1870.

== History ==
Forward was built by W & H Pitcher at Northfleet, Kent, England, and was launched on 8 December 1855. She was fitted for Royal Navy service in British Columbia in 1859 where she served along with her sister ship HMS Grappler. Together they were involved in the Lemalchi incident in the spring of 1863 when they hunted down and captured natives believed to have murdered some Gulf Island settlers. Forward used her guns to level a village on Kuper Island; she then transported her captives to Victoria where they were tried and hanged.

She was then sold off to Hill & Ready in Esquimault, British Columbia in 1869 for use as a commercial vessel. As a commercial vessel, she went south to Mexico for oysters and was seized near Mazatlan, Mexico, by a descendant of Christopher Columbus, Plácido Vega y Daza. Crewed by Mexicans, and flying the flag of San Salvador, she preyed on shipping and coastal settlements in the Gulf of California. The U.S. Navy considered her a pirate ship, and sent the sloop-of-war USS Mohican in pursuit of her. A launch and five cutters from Mohican discovered Forward beached in the Teacapan Estuary at Boca Teacapan, Sinaloa, Mexico, and destroyed her on 17 June 1870 in the Battle of Boca Teacapan.
