= USS Potomska =

Gunboat of the United States Navy

History

United States
- Name: USS Potomska
- Acquired: by purchase, 25 September 1861
- Commissioned: 20 December 1861
- Decommissioned: 16 June 1865
- Fate: Sold at auction, 10 August 1865

General characteristics
- Type: Wooden screw steamer rigged as a three masted schooner
- Displacement: 287 long tons (292 t)
- Length: 134 ft 6 in (41.00 m)
- Beam: 27 ft (8.2 m)
- Draft: 11 ft (3.4 m)
- Propulsion: Steam engine
- Speed: 10 knots (19 km/h; 12 mph)
- Complement: 95 officers and enlisted
- Armament: 4 × 32-pounder guns; 1 × 20-pounder Parrott rifle

USS Potomska was a wooden screw steamer rigged as a three masted schooner purchased at New York City from H. Haldrege on 25 September 1861. She was commissioned at the New York Navy Yard on 20 December 1861.

== Assigned blockading duties, 1861–1862 ==
Upon commissioning she was ordered to Port Royal, South Carolina, for duty with the South Atlantic Blockading Squadron. Potomska assisted in covering the landing of U.S. troops at the mouth of the Savannah River, Georgia, 28 January 1862. She was in the squadron commanded by Rear Admiral Samuel Francis Du Pont that took possession of Fernandina, Florida on 4 March 1862. On 9 March, with USS Mohican and USS Pocahontas, she took possession of St. Simons Island and Jekyll Island and landed at Brunswick, Georgia. All locations were found to be abandoned in keeping with the general Confederate withdrawal from the seacoast and coastal islands.

On 11 April Potomska was involved in an expedition to St. Catherine's Sound, Georgia. On 27 April she ascended the Riceboro River, Georgia, inducing the Confederates to fire a British brig, then exchanged fire with dismounted Confederate cavalry concealed in the woods of Woodville Island, effectively silencing them. She was involved in an expedition to Darien, Georgia on 9 May, and made a reconnaissance in Great Ogeechee River, Georgia, 1 July, exchanging fire with a Confederate battery there. Potomska was briefly decommissioned at Philadelphia, Pennsylvania in August for repairs.

== Second commission, 1862–1864 ==
In September 1862 Potomska steamed back to Port Royal for duty in St. Simons Sound. In late October she proceeded to blockade Sapelo Sound. On 7 November Polontska escorted Army transport USS Darlington up the Sapelo River, Georgia, shelling the shore to cover a landing at Spaulding's.

On 23 February 1863 Potomska captured blockade-running British schooner Belle in Sapelo Sound with a cargo of coffee and salt. A week later she returned to St. Simons Sound. On 1 June she was ordered to move her blockade to Fernandina where she remained until September. She then returned to Port Royal for repairs which lasted into December when she was laid up prior to going north for further repairs. Potomska decommissioned for repairs at Baltimore, Maryland in March 1864.

== Third commission, 1864–1865 ==
Potomska was recommissioned on 21 June 1864, returning to Port Royal on 11 July. On 30 July a landing party from Potomska destroyed two large Confederate salt works near the Back River, Georgia. On their return the party was taken under fire by Confederates and a sharp battle ensued before they safely reached the ship, later receiving a commendation from Rear Admiral John A. Dahlgren. On 22–24 August Potomska's men raided a turpentine still near White Oak River, Georgia.

As of September 1864 Potomska was blockading Charleston, South Carolina. In October she was stationed at Georgetown. In November she was commanded briefly by Lt. A. T. Mahan who returned her to Charleston, where she remained occasionally chasing and firing on blockade runners. On 16 and 17 February 1865 ships of the South Atlantic Blockading Squadron, including Polomska and six others, and boats and launches from these vessels supported the amphibious U.S. Army landing at Bull's Bay, South Carolina. This was a successful diversionary movement in the major thrust to take Charleston, designed to contain Confederate strength away from General Sherman's route. In March Potomska was up the Cooper River. On 1 June she was off Charleston, then steamed north.

== Final decommissioning ==
Potomska decommissioned at Philadelphia, Pennsylvania on 16 June 1865, and was sold at auction there on 10 August 1865, for $7,100.

== See also ==
- Union Navy
