= USS Ohio (1820) =

1820 ship of the line

Coordinates: 41.0914°N 72.3682°W

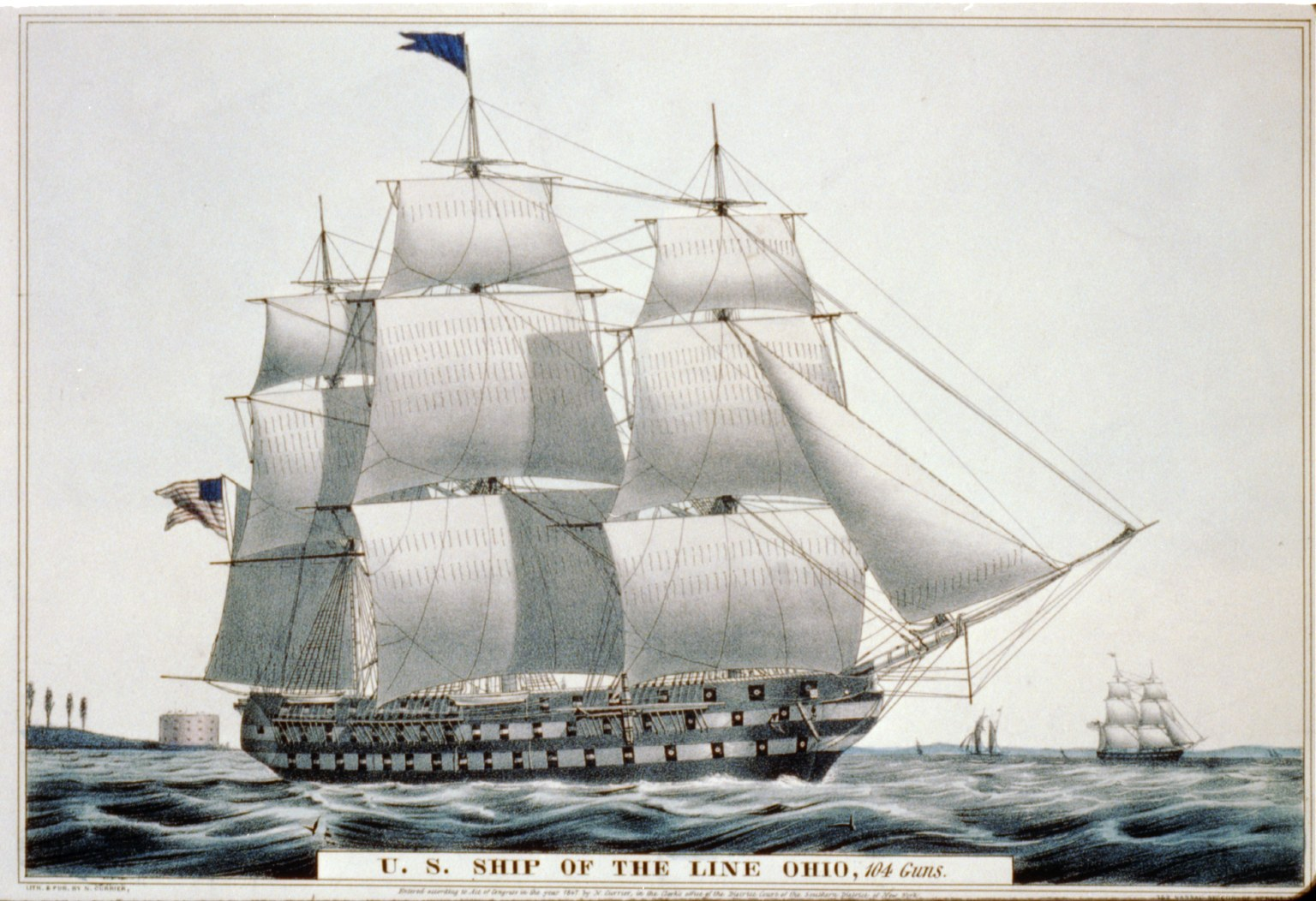
- USS Ohio

History

United States
- Name: USS Ohio
- Namesake: Ohio
- Builder: Henry Eckford (naval architect)
- Laid down: 1817
- Launched: 30 May 1820
- Commissioned: before 16 October 1838
- Recommissioned: 7 December 1846, needed for the Mexican–American War
- Decommissioned: 1875
- Fate: Sold 1883, burned 1884

General characteristics
- Type: Ship of the line
- Displacement: 2724
- Length: 197 ft (60 m)
- Beam: 53 ft (16 m)
- Draft: 22.2 ft (6.8 m)
- Propulsion: Sail
- Speed: 12 kn (14 mph; 22 km/h)
- Complement: 840 officers and men
- Armament: 34 × 42lb on lower deck; 34 × 32lb on gun deck; 34 × 42lb carronades on spar deck; 2 × 32lb long gun on forecastle; 104 guns total

The second USS Ohio was a ship of the line of the United States Navy, rated at 74 guns, although her total number of guns was 104. She was designed by Henry Eckford, laid down at Brooklyn Navy Yard in 1817, and launched on 30 May 1820. She went into ordinary and in the ensuing years decayed badly. Refitted for service in 1838, Ohio sailed on 16 October 1838 to join the Mediterranean Squadron under Commodore Isaac Hull. Acting as flagship for two years, she protected commerce and suppressed the slave trade off the African coast. Ohio proved to have excellent performance under sail, repeatedly making more than 12 kn (14 mph; 22 km/h). One of her officers stated, "I never supposed such a ship could be built—a ship possessing in so great a degree all the qualifications of a perfect vessel." In 1840, Ohio returned to Boston, where she again went into ordinary. From 1841 to 1846, Ohio served as receiving ship.

To meet the needs of the Mexican–American War, Ohio was recommissioned on 7 December 1846, and sailed on 4 January 1847 for the Gulf of Mexico, arriving off Veracruz on 22 March. Ohio landed 10 guns on 27 March to help in the siege of Veracruz; the city soon surrendered.

Ohio drew too much water for coastal operations in the gulf. However, 336 of her crew participated in the Tuxpan River Expedition. In 1847, the entire distance from the mouth of the river to the town was covered with thick jungle growth. The enemy had constructed three well-positioned forts on bluffs overlooking bends in the river. On 17 April, Commodore Matthew Perry arrived off the mouth of the river with 15 vessels. At 22:00, light-draft steamers Scourge, Spitfire, and Vixen, each towing a schooner, moved up stream. Bombships Etna, Hecla, and Vesuvius followed closely while 30 surf boats containing 1,500 men brought up the rear. Approaching the town, the squadron came under hot fire from Fort LaPena. Cmdre. Perry ordered Commander Franklin Buchanan to disembark the surf boats and storm the fort. As the landing party swept ashore, the Mexicans abandoned their position. The other two forts fell in a like manner, with only light casualties sustained by the squadron. Men from Ohio retrieved the guns of brig Truxtun, which had foundered in a storm near Tuxpan on 16 September 1846. The town was occupied and all military stores destroyed.

Following Tuxpan, Ohio sailed from Veracruz and arrived in New York on 9 May. On 26 June, she sailed to bolster the Pacific Squadron, first carrying the U.S. minister to Brazil and operating off the east coast of South America until December. In Valparaíso on 21 January 1848, Cmdre. Thomas ap Catesby Jones took her as the flagship of the Pacific Squadron, intending to blockade the western Mexico ports. Ohio arrived at Mazatlán on 6 May, shortly after the Mexican–American War ended. Jones used the fleet to help transport to Monterey, California, those that had aided the United States in the war, arriving there on 9 October. Ohio then sailed to Sausalito, in San Francisco Bay. Ohio spent the next two years in the Pacific protecting commerce and policing the newly acquired California Territory during the chaotic early months of the gold rush. Scurvy struck the crew in the spring of 1849 in San Francisco Bay, so Jones sent Ohio to the Sandwich Islands for fresh food.

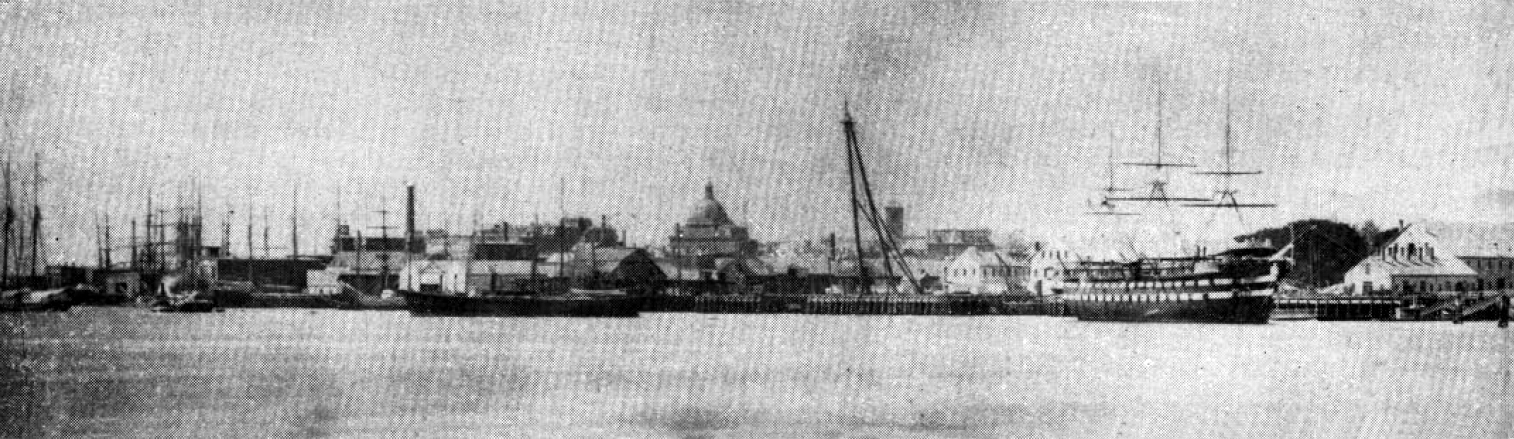
Ohio as a receiving ship at Boston in the 1870s.

In 1850, she returned to Boston, where she again went into ordinary. In 1851, Ohio became a receiving ship and continued this duty until again placed in ordinary in 1875. Ohio was sold at Boston to J. L. Snow of Rockland, Maine on 27 September 1883. She was burned in the following year, in Greenport Harbor, New York; the remains are still accessible to scuba divers. The wreck is off Fanning Point, in about 20 ft (6.1 m) of water.

== See also ==
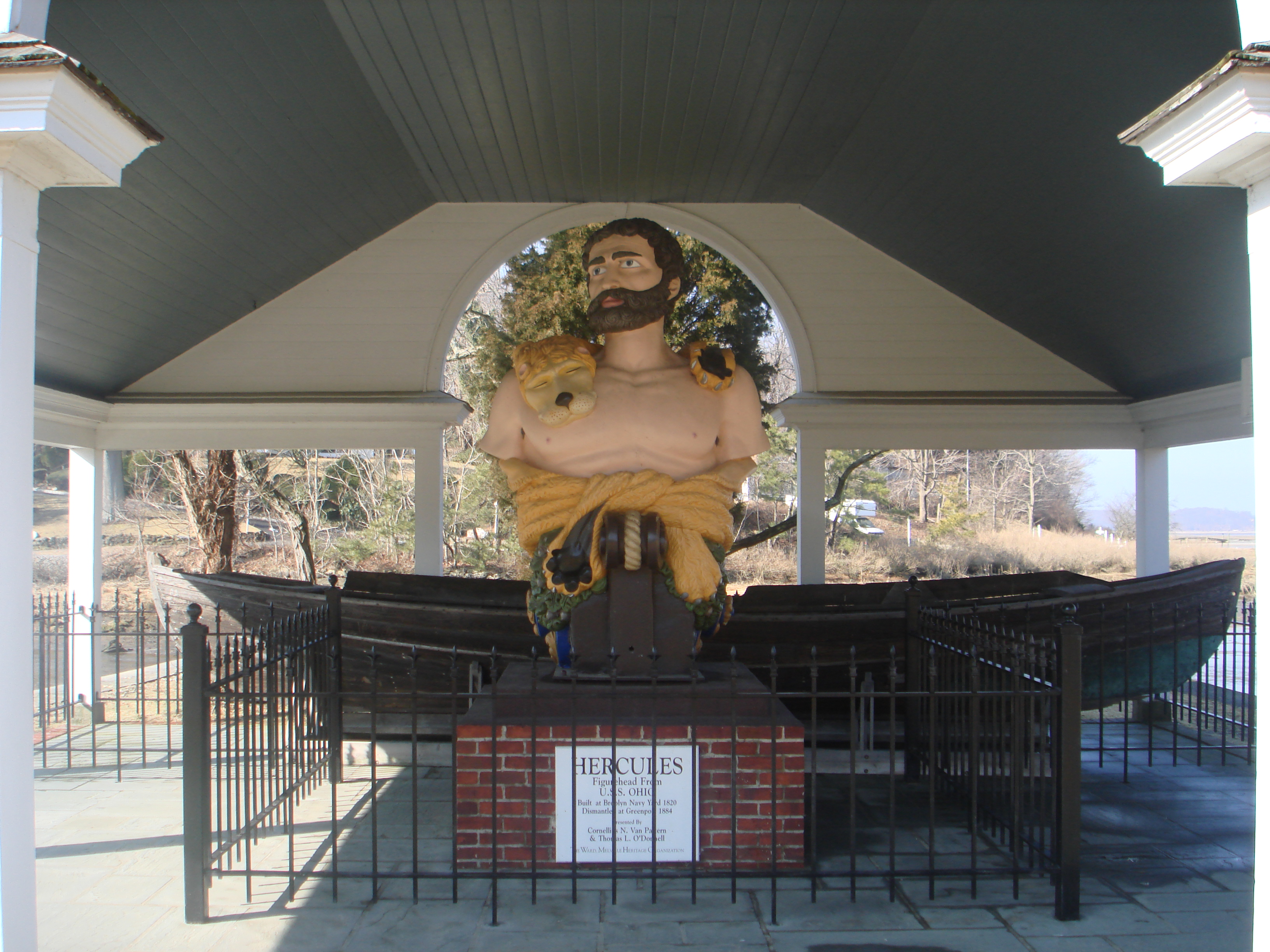
The ship's figurehead, a cedar carving of Hercules, was saved and is currently on display in Stony Brook, New York, along with the ship's anchor.

- Samuel P. Carter – first American officer to be awarded both the rank of rear admiral and major general
