= USS Vesuvius (1846) =

Gunboat of the United States Navy

History

United States
- Launched: 1845
- Acquired: 1846
- In service: circa 1846
- Fate: sold, October 1848

General characteristics
- Displacement: 239 tons
- Length: 97 ft 0 in (29.57 m)
- Beam: 26 ft 0 in (7.92 m)
- Draft: 9 ft 8 in (2.95 m) (forward); 11 ft 4 in (3.45 m) (aft)
- Depth of hold: 10 ft (3 m)
- Propulsion: sail
- Armament: 1 × 10 in (254 mm) mortar

USS Vesuvius was a 239-ton steamer acquired by the United States Navy for use during the Mexican–American War which was an armed military conflict between the United States and Mexico from 1846 to 1848 in the wake of the 1845 U.S. annexation of Texas.

Vesuvius, outfitted with a heavy 10 in (254 mm) mortar that was designed to attack and damage land-based fortifications, was assigned by the Navy to operations in the Mexican battle zones.

== Service history ==
Vesuvius – a coastal Cargo ship built in 1845 at Williamsburg, New York, as Saint Mary – was acquired by the Navy at New York City in 1846 for use with the blockading squadrons in the Gulf of Mexico. Records of the ship's service are sketchy at best, especially for her early service in the Navy. However, reports indicate that she apparently operated as Vesuvius, off Vera Cruz, although one source dates her renaming as occurring on 5 January 1847. In August 1846, after many members of her crew contracted yellow fever while she was stationed off Vera Cruz, Vesuvius put into Bermuda en route north for recuperation.

She was probably refitted at New York, as records indicate that, under the command of Comdr. George A. Magruder, she departed from that port towards the end of the winter of 1846 and 1847, arriving at Laguna del Carmen, Mexico, on 7 March 1847, for blockade duty. Vesuvius was assigned to the port of Laguna. At this juncture, Commodore Matthew Galbraith Perry – commanding the Gulf Squadron—appointed Magruder the military governor of the town, and the commander was of great value to Perry as an administrator. The majority of time spent by Vesuvius on the Gulf station was spent at Laguna, where she logged the shipping movements of vessels both inside and outside the harbor.

In the spring of 1847, when Commodore Perry launched his expedition against Tuxpan, Vesuvius was withdrawn temporarily from Laguna to support the operation. The Mexicans defending the town with 650 men led by General Cos were ideally situated to command its approaches. The assault on the Mexican defensive works was launched by a 1,500-man landing force drawn from the ships' crews. Twenty-five officers and men from Vesuvius, led by Commander Magruder, took part in this action and were present when the flag of the United States was raised over the captured city.

Twelve days later, Perry launched an all-out assault against Tabasco, the last remaining large port commanded by the Mexicans on the Gulf coast. Although captured earlier by American forces, Tabasco had fallen again to Mexican hands. After leaving guardships at Coatzacoalcos and Tuxpan, Perry arrived off Frontera on 14 June 1847, at the mouth of the river which led to Tabasco. Shifting his flag again to Scorpion, Perry and his squadron commenced the passage up the tortuous channels. At "Devil's Bend," concealed Mexican sharpshooters opened fire from the dense chaparral along the riverbank. Scorpion, Washington, Vesuvius, and the flat-bottomed "surfboats" returned the fire; Vesuvius' 10-inch mortar shells dispersed the snipers; thus allowing the squadron to continue its way upriver.

At six in the evening, the squadron anchored for the night and arranged barricades about the decks to protect the American sailors against sniper fire. During the night, Mexican forces placed obstructions in the only navigable channel. Meanwhile, landing parties from Perry's ships stealthily scaled the steep cliffs which rose from the river. They then rushed the works in a sudden assault which surprised the Mexican troops and put them to flight. During the attack, the gunboats forced their way up the river under the command of Lt. David Dixon Porter, who would later win fame during the American Civil War. Fort Iturbide, mounting six guns, soon fell to a landing force commanded by Lt. Porter, thus clearing the final obstacle from the road to Tabasco. Accordingly, detachments from Scorpion and Spitfire took possession of this objective on the 16th.

Vesuvius remained in the Gulf of Mexico, at Laguna, through the end of the year 1847. Under the command of Lt. Sylvanus William Godon, the brig captured American schooner Wasp on 10 October 1847, which was engaged in illicit trading, and later captured four bungos. Vesuvius moved to Campeche on 8 March 1848 and then back to Laguna late in April. She operated there until sailing north in mid-summer. The brig arrived at Norfolk, Virginia, on 1 August and was sold there the following October.
