= Boca Teacapan =

Coordinates: 22°32′45″N 105°45′30″W

Boca Teacapan (Tecapan Mouth) is the outlet of the Estero de Teacapán (Tecapan Estuary) that drains two large coastal lagoons, Agua Grande Lagoon in Sinaloa and Agua Brava Lagoon in Nayarit to the Pacific Ocean. It forms part of the border between the Escuinapa Municipality of Sinaloa, and Nayarit in Mexico.

Boca Teacapan, lies 22.5 miles southeast of the Baluarte River and 44.5 miles southeast of Mazatlan. The mouth is marked by a light. A continuously breaking bar fronts the entrance and extends up to about 2 miles offshore. The lagoons are accessible only by small craft. Anchorage can be taken off the entrance, about 0.8 mile seaward of the outer edge of the bar.
