= Agua Grande Lagoon =

Coastal Lagoon in Mexico

Coordinates: 22.717°N 105.717°W

Agua Grande Lagoon (Laguna Agua Grande) is a large coastal lagoon in Sinaloa, Mexico. Agua Grande Lagoon is drained into the Pacific Ocean by the Teacapan Estuary.
