= Agua Brava Lagoon =

Coastal lagoon in Nayarit, Mexico

Coordinates: 22.106°N 105.533°W

Agua Brava Lagoon, (Laguna de Agua Brava) is a large coastal lagoon in Nayarit, Mexico. Agua Brava Lagoon is drained into the Pacific Ocean by the Teacapan Estuary.
