= USS Mohican (1859) =

Sloops-of-war of the United States Navy

History

United States
- Name: USS Mohican
- Namesake: Mohican
- Builder: Portsmouth Navy Yard
- Laid down: August 1858
- Launched: 15 February 1859
- Commissioned: 29 November 1859
- Decommissioned: 25 June 1872
- Fate: Broken up, 1873

General characteristics
- Type: Steam sloop-of-war
- Displacement: 1,461 long tons (1,484 t)
- Length: 198 ft 9 in (60.58 m)
- Beam: 33 ft (10 m)
- Draft: 13 ft (4.0 m)
- Propulsion: Steam engine
- Speed: 10.5 kn (12.1 mph; 19.4 km/h)
- Complement: 160 officers and enlisted
- Armament: 2 × 11 in (280 mm) guns, 4 × 32-pounder guns

The first USS Mohican was a steam sloop-of-war in the United States Navy during the American Civil War. She was named for the Mohican tribe and was the first ship of her class.

Mohican was laid down by Portsmouth Navy Yard, Kittery, Maine, in August 1858; launched on 15 February 1859; and commissioned on 29 November 1859, Commander Sylvanus William Godon in command.

== Pre-Civil War ==
=== African Squadron, 1859–1861 ===
Assigned to the African Squadron, Mohican departed Portsmouth on 19 January 1860 for the South Atlantic and for the next year and one-half cruised on patrol against pirates and slavers off the coasts of Africa and at times Brazil. On 8 August, the sloop captured the slaver Erie — commanded by Nathaniel Gordon — off the Congo and forced that ship to unload its captive cargo at Monrovia, Liberia. She remained on station until sailing for home on 13 August 1861.

== Civil War ==
=== Battle of Port Royal, 1861 ===
Following her arrival at Boston, Massachusetts on 27 September, she sailed to join Flag Officer Samuel Du Pont's South Atlantic Blockading Squadron off Sandy Hook, New Jersey. Departing Norfolk, Virginia on 29 October for Port Royal, South Carolina, as part of the largest U.S. naval squadron assembled to that time, the sloop steamed in the battleline on 7 November as Du Pont's squadron pounded Fort Walker on Hilton Head Island, forcing the Confederates to abandon the emplacement, thereby allowing a combined Union Army and Navy Force to land and occupy this important base of operations. Mohican was hit six times by Confederate shells in this engagement, suffering superficial hull damage and having one man killed and seven wounded. One of the wounded officers was Acting Master Isaac D. Seyburn.

=== Blockade duty, 1861–1862 ===
The steamer sailed to Charleston Bar at the end of November accompanying part of the "Stone Fleet", and stood by while these ships were scuttled on 18–19 December to obstruct channels to Confederate ports in the Carolinas and Georgia. The warship then operated off the southern coast with steamer USS Bienville, searching for Confederate shipping, capturing British blockade runner Arrow off Fernandina, Florida on 25 February 1862. In company with sloop Pocahontas and schooner USS Potomska, she took possession of St. Simons Island and Jekyll Island near Brunswick, Georgia on 9–10 March, but found them deserted because of a general Confederate withdrawal from the seacoast and coastal islands. In early April, Mohican reconnoitered the Wilmington River to determine the best way of obstructing it, helping to cut off Fort Pulaski from Savannah as part of the projected attack on that fort and then operated out of St. Simons Bay, Georgia, on blockade until ordered to Philadelphia, Pennsylvania on 29 June. The ship decommissioned there on 9 July.

==== Hunting the raiders, 1862–1864 ====
Mohican recommissioned on 17 October and five days later was ordered on special service chasing the Confederate raiders CSS Florida and Alabama. Sailing immediately, the steamer cruised on station from the Cape Verde Islands to the Cape of Good Hope operating off the coasts of Africa and South America into 1864. She returned to Philadelphia on 14 April 1864 without contacting the elusive enemy and was decommissioned there two weeks later.

=== Battles of Fort Fisher, 1864–1865 ===
Reactivated on 7 October, the warship was assigned to Rear Admiral David Dixon Porter's North Atlantic Blockading Squadron and cruised off Wilmington, North Carolina through December. She then joined the rest of the squadron in the attack on Fort Fisher on 24–25 December, firing over 500 shells in the fierce bombardment. Mohican resumed her blockade, now off Beaufort, North Carolina, until the second attack on Fort Fisher from 13 to 15 January 1865. As part of the first line of battle, the sloop bombarded the Confederate bastion throughout the three-day campaign, supplying covering fire for the landings on the second and third days until the fort was taken on the 15th. During the engagement, Mohican lost one man killed and 10 wounded.

=== End of the war, 1865 ===
The warship was ordered to Rear Adm. John Dahlgren's South Atlantic Blockading Squadron on 17 January, carrying dispatches for General William T. Sherman. She began blockading off Ossabaw Island, South Carolina on 3 February and remained there until ordered north on the 24th. The steam sloop decommissioned at Boston Navy Yard on 26 April and remained there — repairing — until recommissioning on 18 August 1866.

== Post-Civil War ==
=== Pacific Squadron, 1865–1872 ===
The sloop was then assigned to the Pacific Squadron and departed 6 September for the west coast, steaming via St. Thomas, ports in Brazil, Montevideo, round Cape Horn, to Valparaíso, joining Rear Adm. Dahlgren in Powhatan at Callao, Peru on 25 April 1867 and then steaming up the Pacific coast, through Panama and the coast of Mexico, arriving at San Francisco, California on 28 July.

Mohican remained on the Pacific coast through 1872, cruising to South America in the fall and winter of 1867 and then decommissioning from 3 April 1868 – 7 June 1869 at Mare Island Navy Yard. The warship made one cruise to Siberia and the northwest coast during the summer of 1869 and then departed on 11 October to cruise to Hawaii, returning on 11 January 1870. She then made a second cruise to the Pacific Northwest and in May sailed to patrol off Mexico. On 17 June 1870, men from Mohican attacked the Mexican pirate steamer Forward, which had terrorized the coast for the previous month. In a fierce gun battle between Mohican's armed boats and the outlaw vessel off Mazatlán, the pirate was boarded and captured. The sloop continued her cruise as far south as Callao through August 1871, returning on the 25th. The warship made one more cruise along the coast of Mexico to Panama from October–April 1872.

Mohican decommissioned at Mare Island on 25 June 1872 and by the end of the year had sunk at her moorings. She was subsequently towed onto the Mare Island mud flats and broken up.

== See also ==
- Union Navy
- Battle of Boca Teacapan
