= Teacapan Estuary =

Estuary in Mexico

Coordinates: 22°32′50″N 105°45′00″W

Teacapan Estuary (Estero de Teacapán) is an estuary in Mexico, within the two provinces of Sinaloa and Nayarit. This long outlet drains two large coastal lagoons, Agua Grande Lagoon in Sinaloa on its northern end and Agua Brava Lagoon in Nayarit at its southern end, into the Pacific Ocean at its mouth, the Boca Teacapan. The estuary forms part of the border between the Escuinapa Municipality, Sinaloa, and the Tecuala Municipality of Nayarit.

The Teacapan Estuary is also fed by the Acaponeta River in its southern arm, and the Cañas River in the northern arm.
