= Saʻilele, American Samoa =

Saʻilele
- Village
- Etymology: "Forbidden grounds" in Samoan
- Location within American Samoa
- Coordinates: 14°15′26″S 170°35′50″W
- Country: United States
- Territory: American Samoa
- County: Sua County
- Named for: Samoan mythology

Population (2020)
  - Total: 60
- Time zone: Samoa Time Zone
- ZIP code: 96799
- Area code: +1 684

Saʻilele is a village on the north shore in the Eastern District of Tutuila Island in American Samoa. It is reached from a cross-island road which leads north from the village of Fagaʻitua. On a track east of the village is a burial ground where some aliʻi (high chiefs) were buried.

Saʻilele was home to the only pre-Christian temple ever documented on Tutuila Island: Saʻilele Mālumālu. The temple consisted of a small fale about ten feet in length, covered by a low roof. The structure was set in a thick and sacred grove of coconut trees. Rocks discovered inside the temple were referred to as The Immovable Rock, The Enduring Power and The Rock Fixed in the Kingdom.

In 2002, Saʻilele's highest chief, Matua, Togiola Talalelei A. Tulafono, became Governor of American Samoa.

== Etymology ==
According to a high chief of the village, the word Saʻilele derived from the presence of the god Tuliatua, and the goddesses Nafanua, Tilafaiga and Taema. HTC's Vaesaʻu Talauega Letumu explained in an interview: Saʻilele was a village full of ghosts and supernatural spirits in the past, hence the name Sa-i-le-eleʻele (meaning forbidden grounds). Tualiatua's dwelling place was known as the heathen temple, malumalu faapaupau, which was located in the center of the village with a sacred coconut grove next to it. The temple was around six feet tall and ten feet wide. Inside the temple were three stones: the immovable stone, the constant government, and the stone fixed in the kingdom. These stones were buried by the village when missionaries arrived.

== History ==
In the 19th century, missionaries Murray and Barnden journeyed to Saʻilele, where they encountered a Samoan temple. This modest fale measured roughly 10 feet by 6 feet and featured a very low roof, nestled within a sacred palm grove and accessible solely through a priest. Inside the temple, they discovered three revered stones named The Immovable Rock, The Enduring Power, and The Rock Fixed in the Kingdom. Murray was upset when a member of his group carelessly broke one of the stones and was moved to learn that the villagers had subsequently hidden the stones to safeguard them from further desecration.

== Demographics ==
Year	Population
2020	60
2010	75
2000	100
1990	130
1980	117
1970	190
1960	79

According to the 2010 U.S. Census, the village population was 75, down from 100 residents recorded in the 2000 U.S. Census. The majority of residents are in the age range of 35–44. Working-class residents of Saʻilele hold jobs in the American Samoa Government and at the StarKist Samoa Tuna Factory. Its main denominations are the Roman Catholic Church and the Congregational Christian Church in American Samoa (CCCAS).

== Geography ==
Due to its natural beauty, the village of Saʻilele attracts numerous visitors that drive through the terrain and look over the mountains and landscape. Saʻilele is approximately 12 miles northeast of Pago Pago, which is about a 20-minute car ride. To get to Saʻilele, one goes through the villages on the eastern south shore of Tutuila until reaching Fagaitua, where a left turn takes you up the winding hilly road to Masausi and Saʻilele. The village of Saʻilele has some of American Samoa's most beautiful sandy beaches. Saʻilele is tucked behind the mountain. It has a beach with tropical pine trees, palm trees, and a secluded bay. Towards the end of the beach is a line of lava rock that stretches into the ocean, remnants of the ancient lava flow.

== Economy ==
Many Saʻilele residents are fishermen and seafood is a mainstay of the local diet. The land is fertile for both subsistence and commercial farming. All families have at least one small plantation in their backyard for daily consumption. Commercial agriculture include taro, yams, bananas, papayas, and vegetables.

For tourists, the village is known for having some of Tutuila's best swimming beaches. The sandy area below the rock outcrops at the western end of the beach is also a popular site for picnics.
