= Maui (disambiguation) =

Maui is second largest island in the Hawaiian Islands.

Maui may also refer to:

== Geography ==
- Maui County, Hawaii, consisting of Maui and surrounding islands
- Maui gas field, New Zealand
- Te Ika-a-Māui (the fish of Māui), Māori name for the North Island of New Zealand

== Mythology ==
- Māui, hero in Polynesian mythology
- Māui (Hawaiian mythology)
- Māui (Māori mythology)
- Maui (Moana), a character from the 2016 Disney film Moana, based on the mythological figure
- Tiʻitiʻi, equivalent to Māui elsewhere in Polynesia

== People ==
- Crown Prince Maui (fl. 10th century), prince of the Korean kingdom of Silla
- Māui (Christian convert) (died 1816), early New Zealand Māori Christian
- Māui Pōmare (died 1930), New Zealand politician
- Maui Taylor (born 1983), British-born Filipino actress and television personality

== Technology ==
- .NET MAUI, .NET Multi-platform App UI
- USS Maui, the name of more than one United States Navy ship
- Maui Cluster Scheduler, a tool to manage job allocation on computer clusters in high performance computing

== Companies ==
- Maui Jim, sunglasses producer

== Other ==
- Māui dolphin (Cephalorhynchus hectori maui), New Zealand dolphin
