= Peʻa =

Traditional male tatau of Samoa

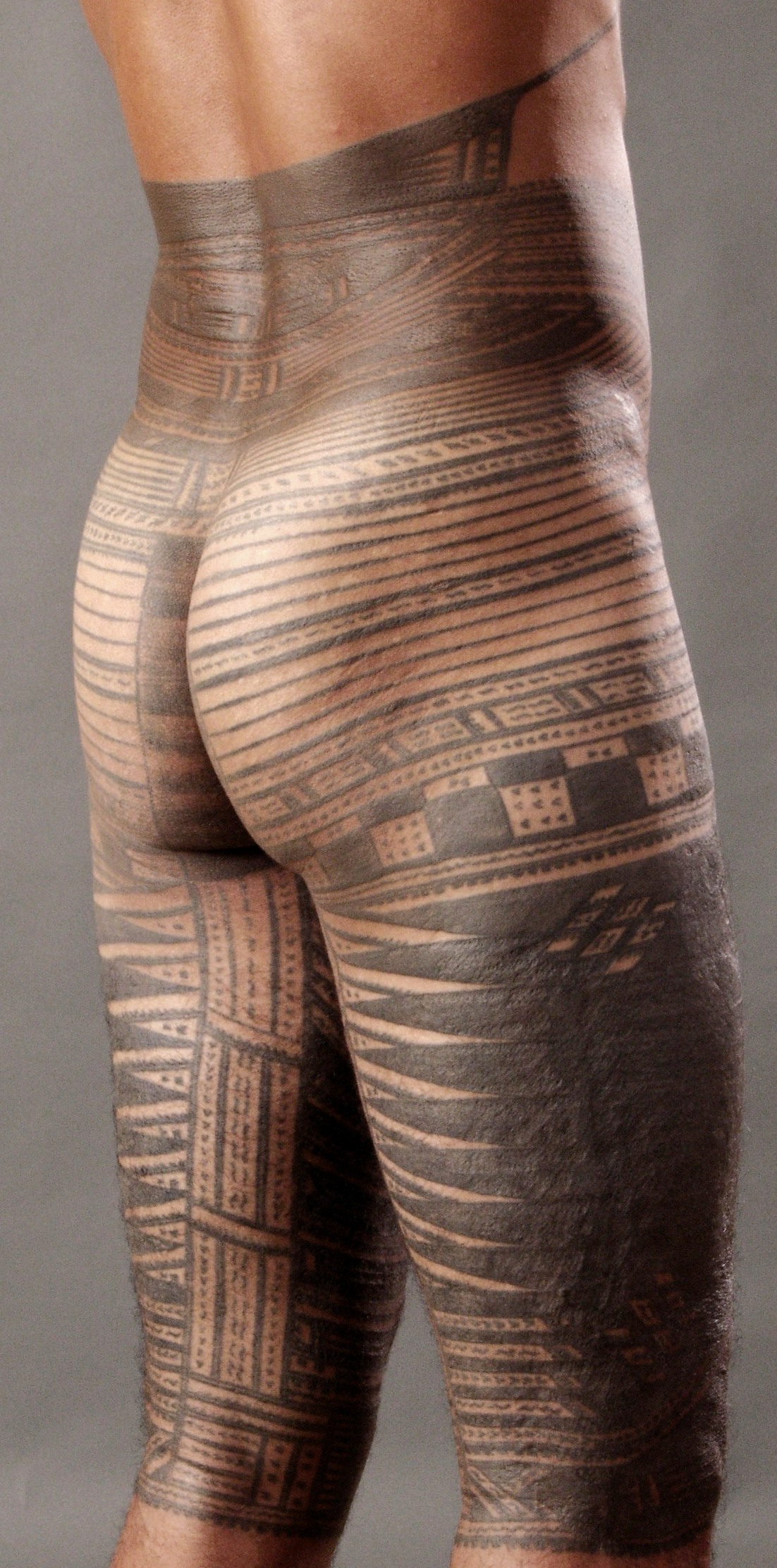
Peʻa, Samoan male tattoo

Peʻa, or malofie, is the traditional male tattoo (tatau) of Samoa. It covers the body from the waist to the knees, and consists of perfectly symmetrical heavy black lines, arrows, and dots. It is a common mistake for people to refer to the peʻa as sogaimiti, because sogaimiti refers to the man with the peʻa and not the peʻa itself.

== History ==
The tattooing tools (au) were originally made of bone or sharpened boar husk, cut into a comb style with serrated teeth shaped like needles. It was then attached to a small patch of sea turtle which was connected to a wooden handle.

In the 1830s, English missionaries attempted to abolish the peʻa by banning it in missionary schools. The purpose of this was to "westernise" the Samoans, but during the time that tattooing was banned, it was still done in secret. Because of this, Samoa has managed to retain its traditional tattoos in modern times, although it is done to a much lesser extent than it used to be.

In present times, the traditional design of peʻa continues to be a source of sacred cultural heritage, as an act of honour.

== Description ==
The peʻa covers the body from the middle of the back to the knees. The word tattoo in the English language is believed to have originated from the Samoan word "tatau" or the word "tattowing" as Captian Cook's sailors called it.

The tatau process for the peʻa is extremely painful, and undertaken by tufuga ta tatau (master tattooists), using a set of handmade tools: pieces of bone, turtle shell and wood. The tufuga ta tatau are revered masters in Samoan society. In Samoan custom, a peʻa is performed only in the traditional way, with elements of cultural ceremony and ritual, and carries a strong meaning for the recipient. The tufuga ta tatau works with two assistants, called 'au toso, who are often apprentice tattooists and they stretch the skin, wipe the excess ink and blood and generally support the tattooist in their work. The process takes place with the subject lying on mats on the floor with the tattooist and assistants beside them. Family members of the person getting the tattoo are often in attendance at a respectful distance, offering words of encouragement, sometimes through song. The peʻa can take less than a week to complete, or, in some cases, years.

The ink colour is black. The tattoo starts on the back and finishes on the navel. Overall, the design is symmetrical with a pattern consisting mainly of straight lines and larger blocks of dark cover, usually around the thighs. Some art experts have made a comparison between the distinctive Samoan tattoo patterns and other art forms, including designs on tapa cloth and pottery of the Lapita culture.

Traditional Samoan tattooing of the peʻa, body tattoo, is an ordeal that is not lightly undergone. It can take many weeks to complete, is very painful, and used to be a prerequisite for receiving a matai title; however, this is no longer the case. Tattooing was also a very costly procedure, the tattooer receiving in the region of 700 fine mats as payment. It was not uncommon for half a dozen boys to be tattooed at the same time, requiring the services of four or more tattooers. It was not just the men who received tattoos, but the women too, although their designs are of a much lighter nature, resembling filigree rather than the large areas of solid dye frequently seen in men's tattoos. The tattooing of women was not as ritualised as that of the men.

== Lama ==
Better known by its Hawaiian name kukui, the oily kernel of the husked candlenut, known in Samoan as tuitui or lama, is burned and the black soot collected is used as the color base for the traditional ink used in Samoan tattooing. The modern tufuga artists utilize commercially produced inks that comply with international tattoo regulations and local health safety codes.

== Societal significance ==
Samoan males with a peʻa are called Soga'imiti and are respected for their courage. Untattooed Samoan males are colloquially referred to as telefua or telenoa, literally "naked". Some who begin the tattooing ordeal do not complete it due to the pain, or more rarely the inability to adequately pay the tattooist. The incomplete tattoo is called peʻa mutu, a mark of shame. The traditional female tattoo in Samoa is the malu. In Samoan society, the peʻa and the malu are viewed with cultural pride and identity as well as a hallmark of manhood and womanhood.

== Spiritual and theological dimensions ==
In addition to its social role, the peʻa holds deep spiritual meaning within Samoan cosmology. Ethnographers and tufuga ta tatau describe the process as a sacred covenant between the recipient, the tattooist, and the ancestral spirits (atua). The act of receiving a peʻa is understood as a form of purification, endurance, and self-offering that strengthens a man’s connection to his family lineage, village, and to God.

Traditional ceremonies often begin with prayers and blessings invoking courage and protection for both the subject and the artist. The period before tattooing may involve fasting, abstinence, or other preparations to ready the mind and spirit. The ordeal of pain endured during the process is regarded as a test of humility and faith, symbolising a moral transformation. Contemporary Samoan theologians have also drawn parallels between the discipline of the peʻa and Christian notions of sacrifice and rebirth, viewing it as a reconciliation of ancestral custom with modern Christian belief.

Tatau is an ancient Polynesian artform associated with the rites of passage for men. Peʻa is also the Samoan word for the Samoa flying fox (the frugivorous Pteropus samoensis), and there are many Polynesian myths, Samoan proverbs and Samoan legends associated with this winged creature. One legend from Savaiʻi is about Nafanua, Samoa's goddess of war, rescued by flying foxes when she was stranded on an inhospitable island.

== Origins ==
In Polynesia, the origins of tattoo is varied. Samoa credit Fiji as the source of the tatau, although the Fijians practice Veiqia (Fijian pronunciation: [βɛi̯ᵑɡia], the tattooing of women) only, and the Māori of New Zealand credit the underworld of Rarohenga.

In Samoan mythology, the origin of the tatau in Samoa is told in a myth about twin sisters Tilafaiga and Taema who swam from Fiji to Samoa with a basket of tattoo tools. As they swam, they sang a song which said only women get tattooed. But as they neared the village of Falealupo on the island of Savai'i, they saw a clam underwater and dived down to get it. When they emerged, their song had changed, with the lyrics now saying that only men get the tattoo, not women. This song is known in Samoa as the Pese o le Peʻa or Pese o le Tatau.

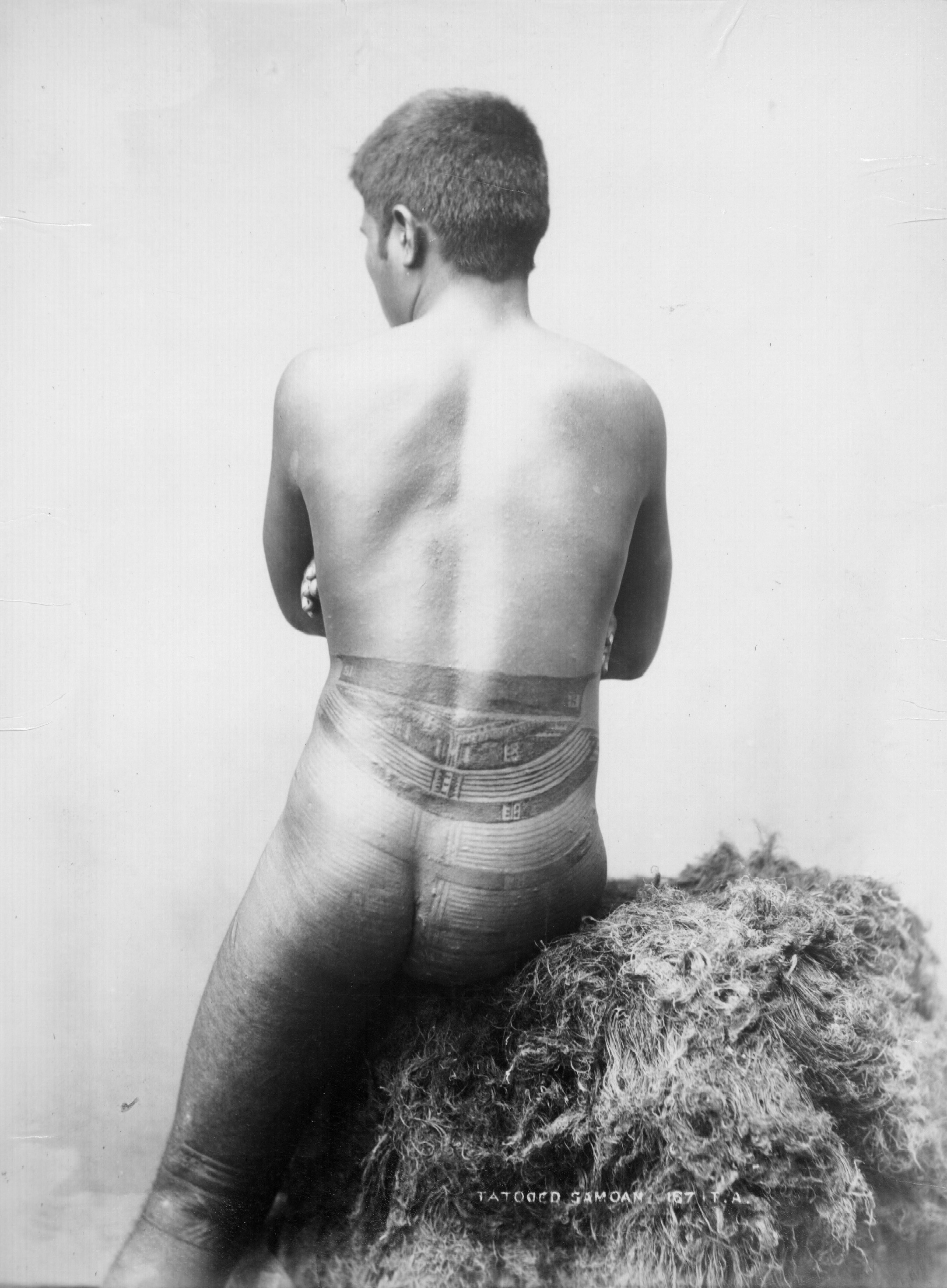
Back view of Samoan male with peʻa, c. 1890s, photo by Thomas Andrew

The word tatau has many meanings in Samoa. Tā means to strike, and in the case of tattooing, the tap tap sound of the tattooist's wooden tools. Tau means to reach an end, a conclusion, as well as war or battle. Tatau also means rightness or balance. It also means to wring moisture from something, like a wet cloth, or in the case of the peʻa process, the ink from the skin. Tata means to strike repeatedly or perform a rhythm. For example, tātā le ukulele means 'play the ukulele.'

== Implements ==
The tools of the tufuga ta tatau comprise a set of serrated bone combs (au), which were lashed to small tortoise shell fragments which were in turn lashed to a short wooden handle; a tapping mallet (sausau) for driving the combs into the skin; coconut shell cups (ipuniu) to mix and store the tattooing ink ("lama") made from burnt candlenut soot; and lengths of tapa cloth ("solo") used to wipe blood and clean tools. The tools are traditionally stored in a cylindrical wooden container called "tunuma" which are lined with tapa cloth and designed to hold the 'au vertically with the delicate combs facing the center of the cylinder to prevent damage. The "sausau" mallet was shaped from a length of hardwood approximately as long as the forearm and about the diameter of the thumb. Various sizes of "au" combs were painstakingly fashioned by filing sections of boar tusk with tiny abrasive files knapped from volcanic flint, chert, and/or basalt rock. The smallest combs, used to make dots ("tala"), are aptly called 'au fa'atala, or 'au mono. Single lines of varying widths were tapped with various sizes of 'au sogi, while the solid blocks of tattooing were accomplished with the 'au tapulu.

== Tattooing Guild ==
The prestigious role of master tattooist (tufuga ta tatau) has been maintained through hereditary titles within two Samoan clans, the Sa Su'a (matai) family from Savai'i and the Sa Tulou'ena matai family of Upolu. In ancient times the masters were elevated to high social status, wealth, and legendary prestige due to their crucial roles in Samoan society. It is known that Samoan tufuga also performed tattooing for Tongan and Fijia paramount chiefly families. The late Sua Sulu'ape Paulo II was a well-known master whose life and work features in the photography of New Zealander Mark Adams. His brother Su'a Sulu'ape Petelo, who lives and carries out Samoan tattooing at Faleasi'u village in Upolu, is one of the most respected master tattooists today. Masters from these ʻaiga (families), were designated in their youth and underwent extensive apprenticeships in the role of solo and tattooist assistants for many years, under their elder tufuga.

The traditional art of tattoo in Samoa was suppressed with the arrival of English missionaries and Christianity in the 1830s. However, it was perpetuated throughout the colonial era and was continually practiced in its intact form into the modern age. This was not the case, however, in the other Polynesian islands, and the master tattooists of the Su'a Sulu'ape family have been instrumental in the revival of traditional tattooing in French Polynesia, Tonga, New Zealand, the Cook Islands, and Hawaii, where a new generation of Pacific tattooists have learned the Samoan techniques and protocols.

== In popular culture ==
- An early documentation of the peʻa on film is seen in Moana (1926), directed by American Robert J. Flaherty and filmed in Safune on the island of Savai'i. The film shows the young hero Moana's friend receiving a peʻa.
- The peʻa is featured in the 2007 horror film The Tattooist.
- The Disney animated film Moana (2016) shows a young man receiving his first peʻa.
- In professional wrestling, many Samoan wrestlers prominently have peʻa tattoos such as Peter Maivia, Roman Reigns, The Rock, Solo Sikoa, and the Usos.

== Non-Samoans and the peʻa ==
It is extremely rare for non-Samoans to receive the peʻa or the malu. Tongan nobility of the Tuʻi Kanokupolu dynasty established the practice of peʻa tattooing among Tongan aristocracy in the pre-contact era. There are stories of Tongan royalty, Tuʻi Tonga Fatafehi Fakauakimanuka and King George Tupou I of the ritual under Samoan tufuga ta tatau. European beachcombers and runaway sailors were the first non-Polynesians to receive the peʻa during the early 1800s; among the earliest non-Polynesians to receive the peʻa was an American named Mickey Knight, as well as a handful of Europeans and Americans who had jumped ship, were abandoned, or visited Samoa. During the colonial era when Samoa fell under German rule, several Europeans underwent the peʻa ritual, including Englishman Arthur Pink, Erich Schultz-Ewerth (the last German governor of Samoa), and a number of German colonial officials. In more recent times, many afakasi (half Samoans) and other non-Samoan men have become soga'imiti, including Noel Messer, FuneFe'ai Carl Cooke, Rene Persoons and artist Tony Fomison, (1939–1990), one of New Zealand's foremost painters, who received a peʻa in 1979. It is also known that several women, such as Karina Persoons, received a malu from tufuga Su'a Sulu'ape Petelo.

== Lyrics Pese o le Tatau song ==
It is known that the last verse was written in modern times, as it does not match the orthography of the first verses. Oral tradition maintains that this song is derived from a pre-colonial chant.

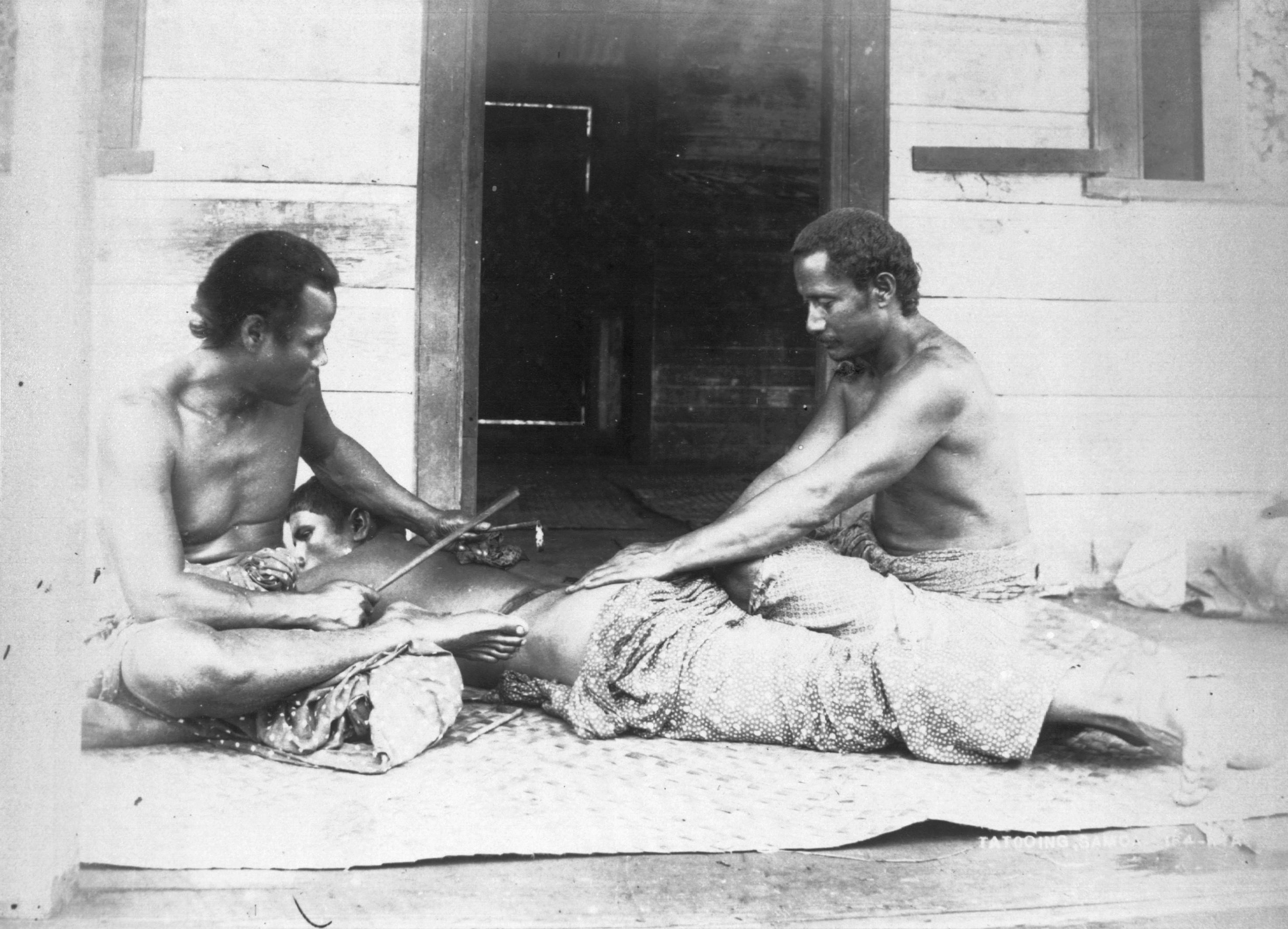
Tattooist, tufuga ta tatau, (left) and assistant (right) tattooing a man's back, c 1895, photo by Thomas Andrew

Samoan language

O le mafuaaga lenei ua iloa

O le taaga o le tatau i Samoa

O le malaga a teine to'alua

Na feausi mai Fiti le vasa loloa

Na la aumai ai o le atoau

ma sia la pese e tutumau

Fai mai e tata o fafine

Ae le tata o tane

A o le ala ua tata ai tane

Ina ua sese sia la pese

Taunuu i gatai o Falealupo

Ua vaaia loa o se faisua ua tele

Totofu loa lava o fafine

Ma ua sui ai sia la pese

Fai mai e tata o tane

Ae le tata o fafine

Talofa i si tama ua taatia

O le tufuga lea ua amatalia

Talofa ua tagi aueue

Ua oti'otisolo le au tapulutele

Sole Sole, ai loto tele

O le taaloga a tama tane

E ui lava ina tiga tele

Ae mulimuli ana ua a fefete

O atu motu uma o le Pasefika

Ua sili Samoa le ta'taua

O le soga'imiti ua savalivali mai

Ua fepulafi mai ana faaila

Aso faaifo, faamulialiao

Faaatualoa, selu faalaufao

O le sigano faapea faaulutao

Ua ova i le vasalaolao

English language

This is the known origin

Of the tattooing of the tatau in Samoa

A journey by two maidens

Who swam from Fiji across the open sea

They brought the tattooing kit

And recited their unchanging chant

That said women were to be tattooed

But men were not to be tattooed

Thus the reason why men are now tattooed

Is because of the confusion of the maidens' chant

Arriving at the coast of Falealupo

They spotted a giant clam

As the maidens dived

Their chant was reversed

To say that men were to be tattooed

And not women

Pity the youth now lying

While the tufuga starts

Alas he is crying loudly

As the tattooing tool cuts all over

Young fellow, young fellow, be brave

This is the sport of male heirs

Despite the enormous pain

Afterwards you will swell with pride

Of all the countries in the Pacific

Samoa is the most famous

The sogaimiti walking towards you

With his fa'aila glistening

Curved lines, motifs like ali

Like centipedes, combs like wild bananas

Like sigano and spearheads

The greatest in the whole world!

== See also ==
- Body suit (tattoo)
