= Saveasiʻuleo =

Somoan god of the Polynesian underworld Pulotu

Saveasiʻuleo is the God of Pulotu (Old concept of Heaven) the underworld of spirits or Hades in Samoan mythology.

He is the father of Nafanua the Goddess of War in Samoa. Nafanua's mother is Tilafaiga, the sister of Taema another figure of Samoan mythology.

Saveasiʻuleo is sometimes referred to as Elo.

The spirits of gods were able to take the form of animals and human beings and Saveasiʻuleo is believed to take the form of an eel or appear as half man and half eel. His ancestors were rocks. One story says that his mother was Taufa and his father, Aloa. His brothers were Salevao and Ulufanuaseʻeseʻe. The brothers agreed that Saveasiʻuleo would go and become king in Pulotu. Saveasiʻuleo would come up from his kingdom and wander the earth. There are different versions of stories told about him. He is referred to as a god and sometimes as a demon. One day Saveasiʻuleo met his twin nieces Tilafaiga and Taema swimming back to Samoa from Fiti where they had learned the art of tattooing. Saveasiʻuleo abducted Tilafaiga and she later gave birth to Nafanua, the goddess of war. The story of the sisters bringing a basket of tattoo tools for the peʻa to Samoa is another well known legend.

== Pulotu ==
According to Samoan beliefs, the entrance into the spirit world Pulotu is at the village of Falealupo, at the western end of the island of Savaiʻi.

== See also ==
- Havea Hikuleʻo
- Polynesian mythology
