= Taʼaroa =

Supreme creator god in the mythology of French Polynesia

Taʼaroa is the supreme creator god in the mythology of the Society Islands of French Polynesia. While the use of the ʼeta is appropriate given the pronunciation of his name, it is often omitted in practice, as is typically the case with Tahitian words.

== The Myth ==
In the beginning, there was only Taʼaroa, creator of all, including himself. He waited alone in his shell, which appeared as an egg spinning in the empty endless void of the time before the sky, before the Earth, before the Moon, before the Sun, before the stars. He was bored, alone in his shell, and so he cracked it with a shake of his body and slid out of its confines, finding everything somber and silent outside, finding himself alone in the nothingness.

So he broke the shell into pieces and from them formed the rocks and the sand, and the foundation of all the world, Tumu-Nui. With his backbone he created the mountains; with his tears he filled the oceans, the lakes, the rivers; with his fingernails and toenails he made the scales that cover the fish and the turtles; with his feathers he created the trees and the bushes; with his blood he colored the rainbow.

Taʼaroa then called forth artists who came with their baskets filled with Toʼi, so that they might sculpt Tane, the first god. Then came Ru, Hina, Maui, and hundreds of others. Tane decorated the sky with stars and hung the sun in the sky to illuminate the day and the moon to illuminate the night. Taʼaroa decided then to complete his work by creating man.

He divided the world into 7 levels. On the bottommost level lived man, and he multiplied quickly, which delighted Taʼaroa. Sharing the space as he did with creatures and plants of all sorts, it was not long before man felt crowded in his space and so decided to expand his domain by opening a hole into the level above his. Man continued in this fashion, filling one level and then climbing to the next, one level at a time, until all levels were occupied.

And so man filled the Earth, but still all belonged to Taʼaroa, who was master of all.

== See also ==
- Cosmic Man
- Io Matua Kore paramount deity in New Zealand Māori mythology
- Tagaloa paramount deity in Samoan mythology
- Tangaroa in Māori mythology.
- Tangaloa in Tongan mythology
- Kanaloa in Hawaiian mythology
