= Atu =

Figure in Samoan mythology

In Samoan mythology, Atu was the first man on Fiji and Tonga. (Note: This is according to the Samoans, not the Fijians or Tongans; see also Ila.)
