= Kiho =

Kiho may refer to:

- Kiho-tumu, the supreme god in the mythology of the Tuamotu archipelago
- Kihō, Mie, a town in Japan
- In the Legend of the Five Rings Collectible Card Game, kiho cards are played as actions, but generate spell effects. Kiho nearly always require a shugenja or monk (sometimes specifically one or the other) to bow as part of the cost of playing the card
- In the Legend of the Five Rings Role-Playing Game, kiho are complex martial arts techniques learned by monks and sometimes shugenja that have some extraordinary or supernatural effect

== People ==
- Kiho Miyashita (宮下 希保; born 1998), Japanese women's basketball player
- Kihō Tomotaka (輝鵬 智貴; born 1999), Japanese sumo wrestler
- Kiho (kickboxer)
