= Raka-maomao =

Māori god of wind

Raka-maomao or Rakamaomao, in Māori mythology, is a god of wind. He is the god of ordinary winds, in contrast to Tāwhirimātea, who is the god of tempests. To the Waitaha tribe of the South Island, Rakamaomao was the group of winds that blew from the south and north.

Raka-maomao is equivalent to Ra‘a (Society Islands), Raka (Cook Islands), La'a Maomao (Hawaii) and Fa'atiu (Samoa).
