= Fisaga =

God of the light and gentle breeze

Fisaga in Samoan mythology is a light and the gentle breeze. In one Samoan legend, Tiʻitiʻi imprisons the winds one by one in his canoe or calabash, leaving only Fisaga free. Other versions of the story attribute this to Maui.

In the Samoan language, fisaga refers to a “gentle, pleasant wind associated with good weather.”
