= Esther T. Mookini =

American linguist (1928–2023)

- Born: Esther Takakura; June 10, 1928; Paia, Hawaii, U.S.
- Died: November 1, 2023 (aged 95); Honolulu, Hawaii, U.S.
- Other name: "Kiki" Mookini
- Education: University of Hawaiʻi at Mānoa
- Spouse: Edwin Mookini

Esther Takakura Mookini (June 10, 1928 – November 1, 2023) was an American linguist responsible for several widely used Hawaiian-language dictionaries.

== Biography ==
Born on June 10, 1928, in Pa'ia, Maui, Mookini was of Japanese ancestry. She married Edwin Mookini, who served as Chancellor of the University of Hawaii at Hilo (1975-1978).

Mookini began studying Hawaiian while an undergraduate at the University of Hawaiʻi at Mānoa, where she would go on to earn a master's degree in Pacific Studies.

Mookini died in Honolulu, Hawaii on November 1, 2023, at the age of 95. She had one daughter, who survived her.

== Linguistic work ==
In 1974, Mookini worked with Mary Kawena Pukui and Samuel H. Elbert to write Place Names of Hawaii, which became so popular that it would go on to be published in 19 editions. It was also published in a pocket edition.

The three also collaborated on Pocket Hawaiian Dictionary (first published in 1975, 5 editions) and the New Pocket Hawaiian Dictionary (first published in 1992, 4 editions). These works are still referenced as the most diacritically accurate Hawaiian spellings and are used as the source material for Ulukau: the Hawaiian Electronic Library, an open source open access Hawaiian dictionary.

Mookini taught Hawaiian language courses and history courses at Kapi'olani Community College. Her focus was to teach students spoken Hawaiian with a special focus on words used in contemporary Hawaiian pidgin and understanding local place names.

Mookini summed up her philosophy of translation once as, "What's the sense of translating and just stashing it away in a library? People won't know it's there!"

== Historical work ==
Mookini translated many important primary source documents written by native Hawaiians in Hawaiian in the nineteenth century into English. Her historical translations included parts of Kepelino's "Hawaiian Collection" (1858), essays from the Hawaiian language newspaper Ka Nupepa Kuokoa (The Independent Newspaper), and a translation of Anatomia, the only medical textbook written in the Hawaiian language (originally published 1838). Her 1974 book The Hawaiian Newspapers remains the key reference text.

During the 1990s, Mookini worked for the Judiciary History Center of Hawai'i in Honolulu. Her translations of court cases have allowed scholars and others to understand how nineteenth-century law was practiced on the islands. In the same period, she was involved in the project to build Hawai'iloa, one of the voyaging canoes (Hokule'a), serving as a volunteer, crew member and educational consultant.

Mookini wrote on Keōpūolani (1778-1823), the queen consort and highest ranking wife of King Kamehameha I and on the secret society the Hale Nauā revived by Kalākaua, the last king of Hawaii.

Mookini also translated Hawaiian stories and legends, such as The Wind Gourd of Laʻamaomao.

== Honors and awards ==
Mookini's first published historical work, A Brief Survey of the Hawaiian Language Newspapers, was awarded a University of Hawaii Library Prize for Pacific Island Area Research in 1967.

In later years, her long involvement with Hawaiian language publishing earned her accolades. She was honored with the Po'okela Award (for publishing person of the year) in 2004. Mookini was awarded the first Pa'a Mo'olelo Award (Distinguished Historian Award) by the Hawaiian Historical Society on October 22, 2005.

In 2006, she received the Mary Kawena Pukui Award from the West Honolulu Rotary Club, "given to honor a non-Hawaiian person who has made a significant contribution to the Hawaiian community through their chosen vocation or field of endeavor."

== Publications ==
- A Brief Survey of the Hawaiian Language Newspapers. 1967.
- The Hawaiian Newspapers. Honolulu: Topgallant Pub. Co., 1974.
- The Hale Naua of David Kalakaua. 1976.
- O na Holoholona wawae eha o Ka Lama Hawaii: The four-footed animals of Ka Lama Hawaii. Honolulu: Bamboo Ridge Press and Hawaii Ethnic Resources Center, 1985.

=== Co-authored ===
==== With Mary Kawena Pukui and Samuel H. Elbert ====
- Place Names of Hawaii. Honolulu: University Press of Hawaii, [1974].
- The Pocket Hawaiian Dictionary, with a Concise Hawaiian Grammar. Honolulu: University Press of Hawaii, [1975].
- Hawaigo-Nihongo jiten ハワイ 語-日本語辞典 [Hawaiian-Japanese dictionary]. Honolulu, HI: University of Hawaii Press, 1990. Additional information by Yū Nishizawa.
- New Pocket Hawaiian Dictionary. Honolulu: University of Hawaii Press, [1992].

==== With others ====
- With G. W. Kahiolo. He moolelo no Kamapuaa: The story of Kamapuaa. Manoa: University of Hawaii - Hawaiian Studies Program, [1978].
- With Gerrit Parmele Judd: Anatomia, 1838. Honolulu: University of Hawai'i Press, 2003.
- With Moses K. Nakuina. The wind gourd of Laʻamaomao: the Hawaiian story of Pākaʻa and Kūapākaʻa: personal attendants of Keawenuiaʻumi, ruling chief of Hawaii and descendants of Laʻamaomao. Honolulu: Kalamakū Press, 2005.
