= Thomas Andrew (photographer) =

New Zealand photographer (1855–1939)

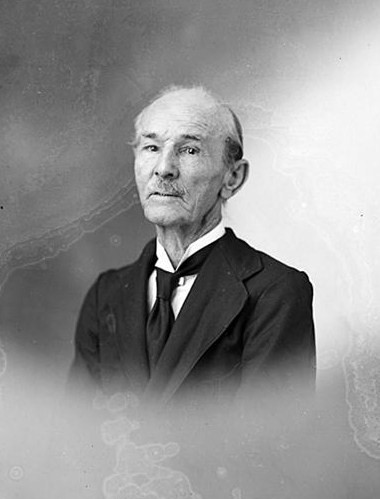
- Thomas Andrew, c. 1919
- Born: 19 January 1855; Takapuna, Auckland, New Zealand
- Died: 7 August 1939 (aged 84); Apia, Samoa
- Known for: Photography

Thomas Andrew (19 January 1855 – 7 August 1939) was a New Zealand photographer who lived in Samoa from 1891 until his death in 1939. He took photographs that are of significant historical and cultural value including the recording on camera of key events in Samoa's colonial era such as the Mau movement, the volcanic eruption of Mt Matavanu (1905–1911) and the funeral of writer Robert Louis Stevenson.

Andrew was born in Takapuna, a suburb of Auckland on the North Island of New Zealand, and educated in Takapuna and Thames. After leaving school he became a draper, before moving to Napier and becoming a photographer. In 1882 he married Miss Margaret Ferguson of Thames, but she died in 1883 in childbirth. In 1886 and 1887 he toured the Pacific on the schooner Southerly Buster with Frederick Moss, and the photographs he took were used to illustrate Moss's book, Through Atolls and Islands in the Great South Sea. On his return to New Zealand he married Emilie Sage, of Dunedin. He opened a photographic studio in Auckland on the corner of Karangahape Road and Pitt Street, but it was shortly destroyed by fire.

In 1891, he went to Samoa where he became a partner in the trading company Parkhouse and Brown. He opened a photography studio in Apia, where he took portraits as well as scenes for the tourist market. He also photographed political events and daily life in Samoa. He also worked with two other New Zealand photographers, Alfred James Tattersall and John Davis. He eventually acquired Parkhouse and Brown, and branched out into cacao planting, as well as introducing para rubber to the country. He died in Apia, in 1939.

Many of his surviving images are held in the collections of the Museum of New Zealand Te Papa Tongarewa and include landscapes and studio portraits of Samoans that went beyond the colonial stereotypes of the time.

== Gallery ==
Historical photographs by Thomas Andrew

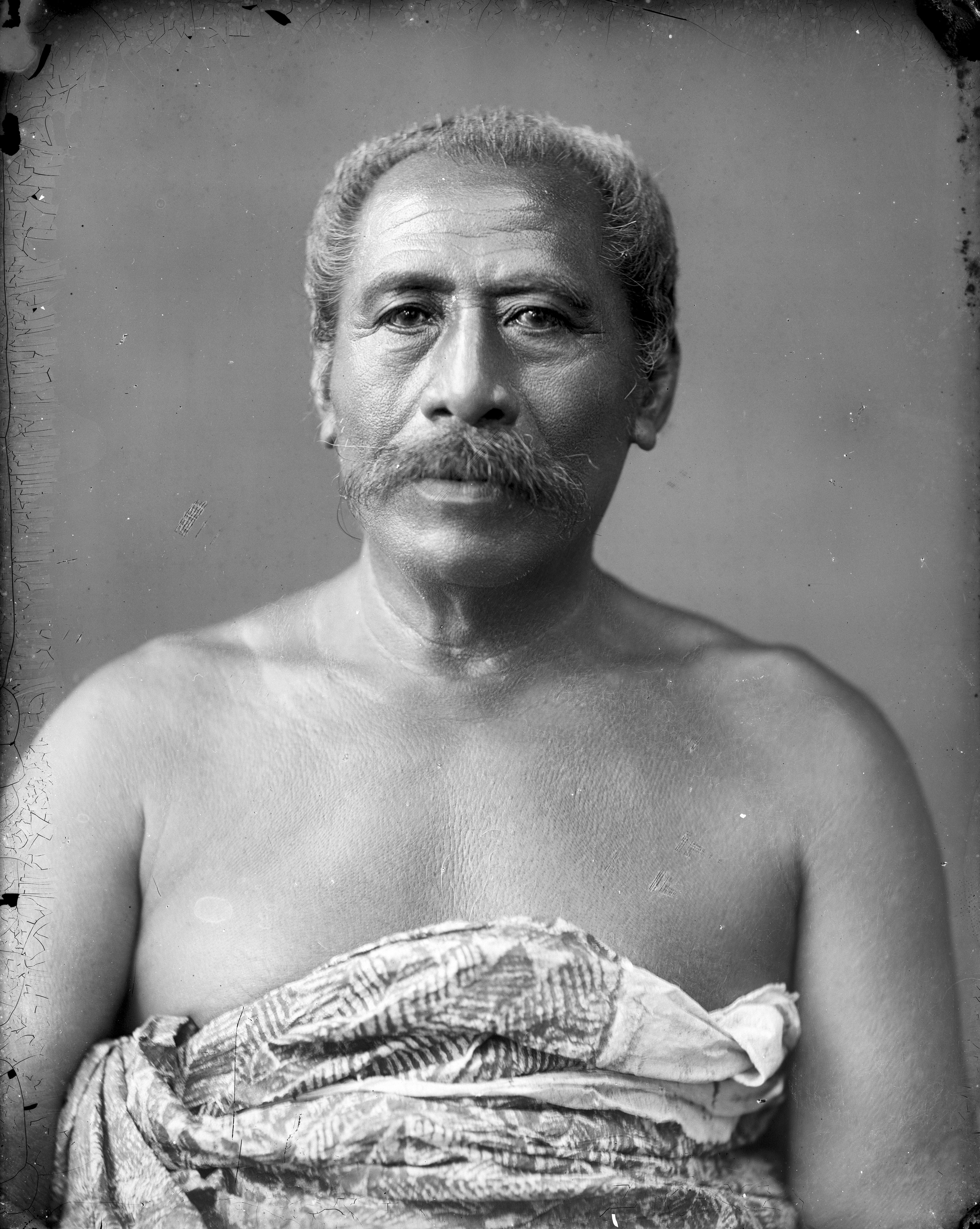
Seumanutafa Pogai, a high chief (matai) of Apia, taken 1890-1910

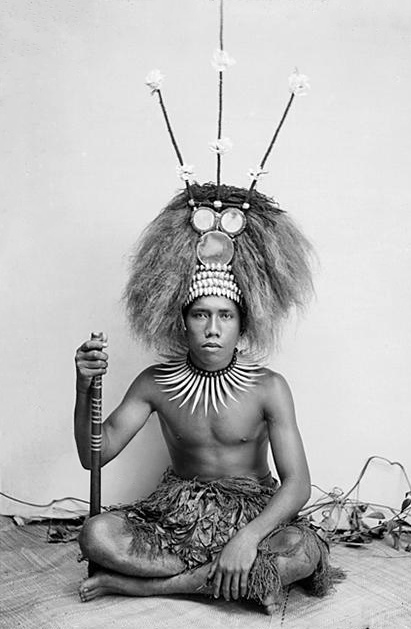
Young man dressed as a manaia, son of a Samoan matai, taken 1890-1910

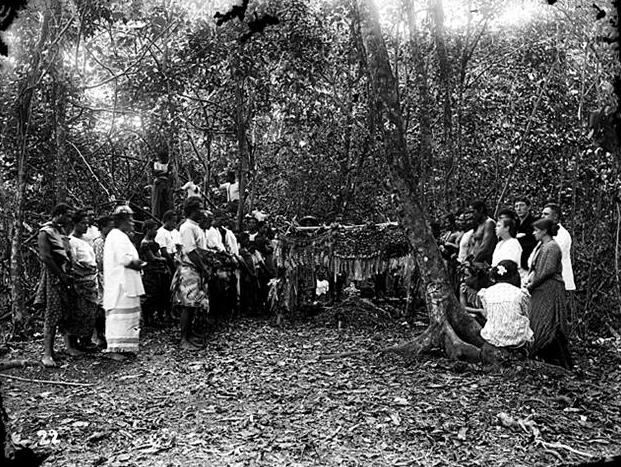
Burial and grave of Robert Louis Stevenson on Mount Vaea, Samoa, 1894

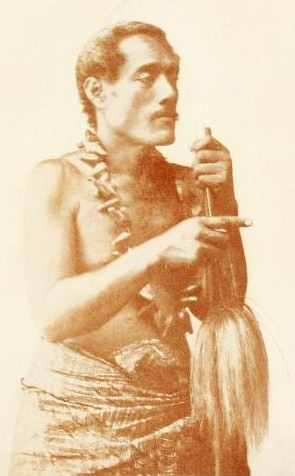
Exiled Samoan leader Lauaki Namulauulu Mamoe (died 1915)

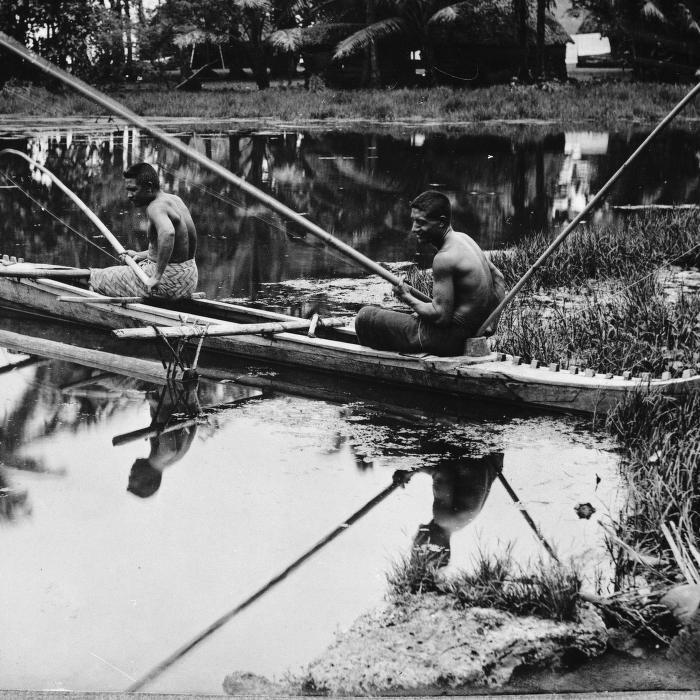
Two men in a canoe (paopao, va'a) fishing in Samoa, c. 1914

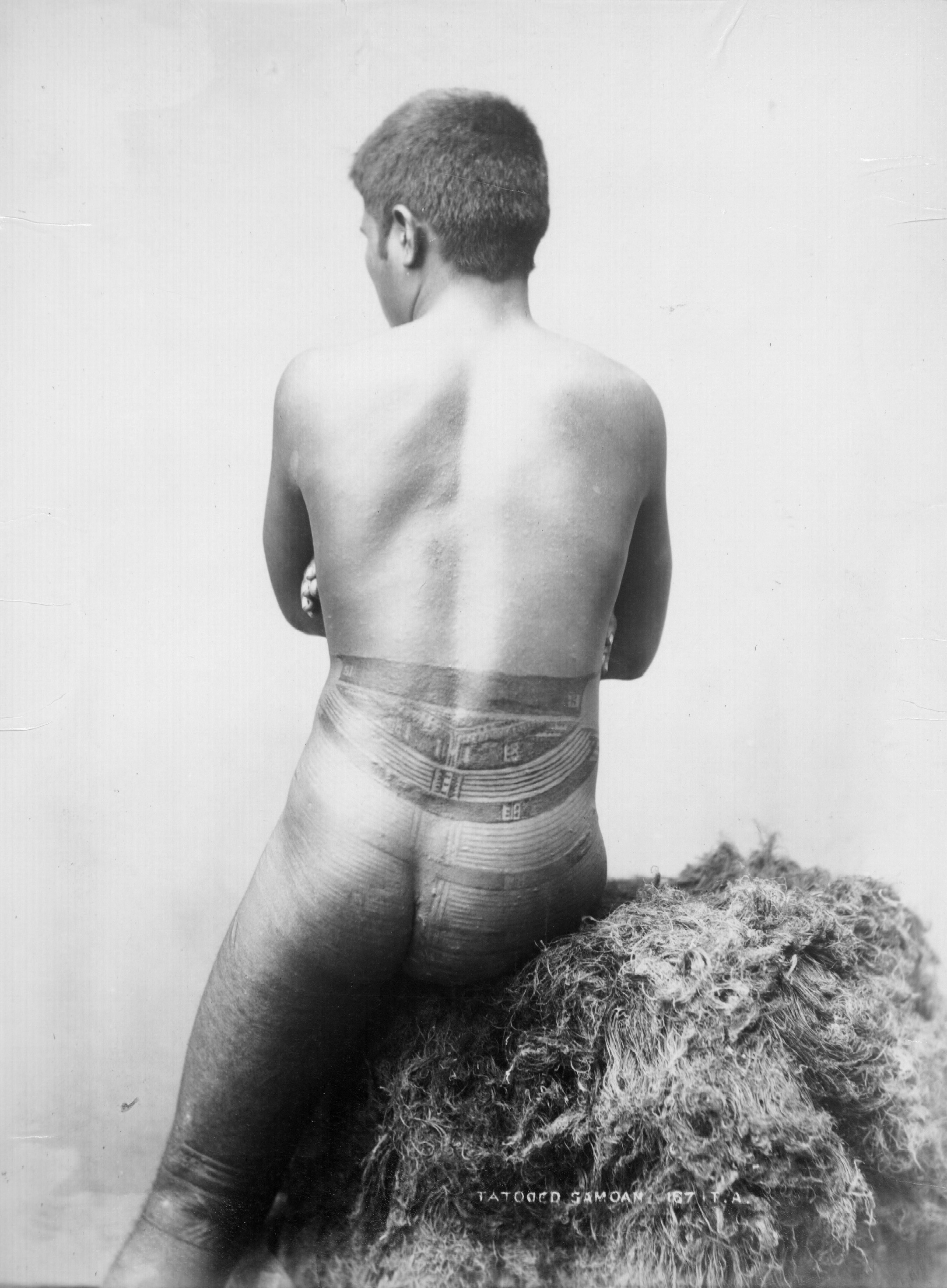
Samoan male with traditional tattoo (pe'a), taken 1890s

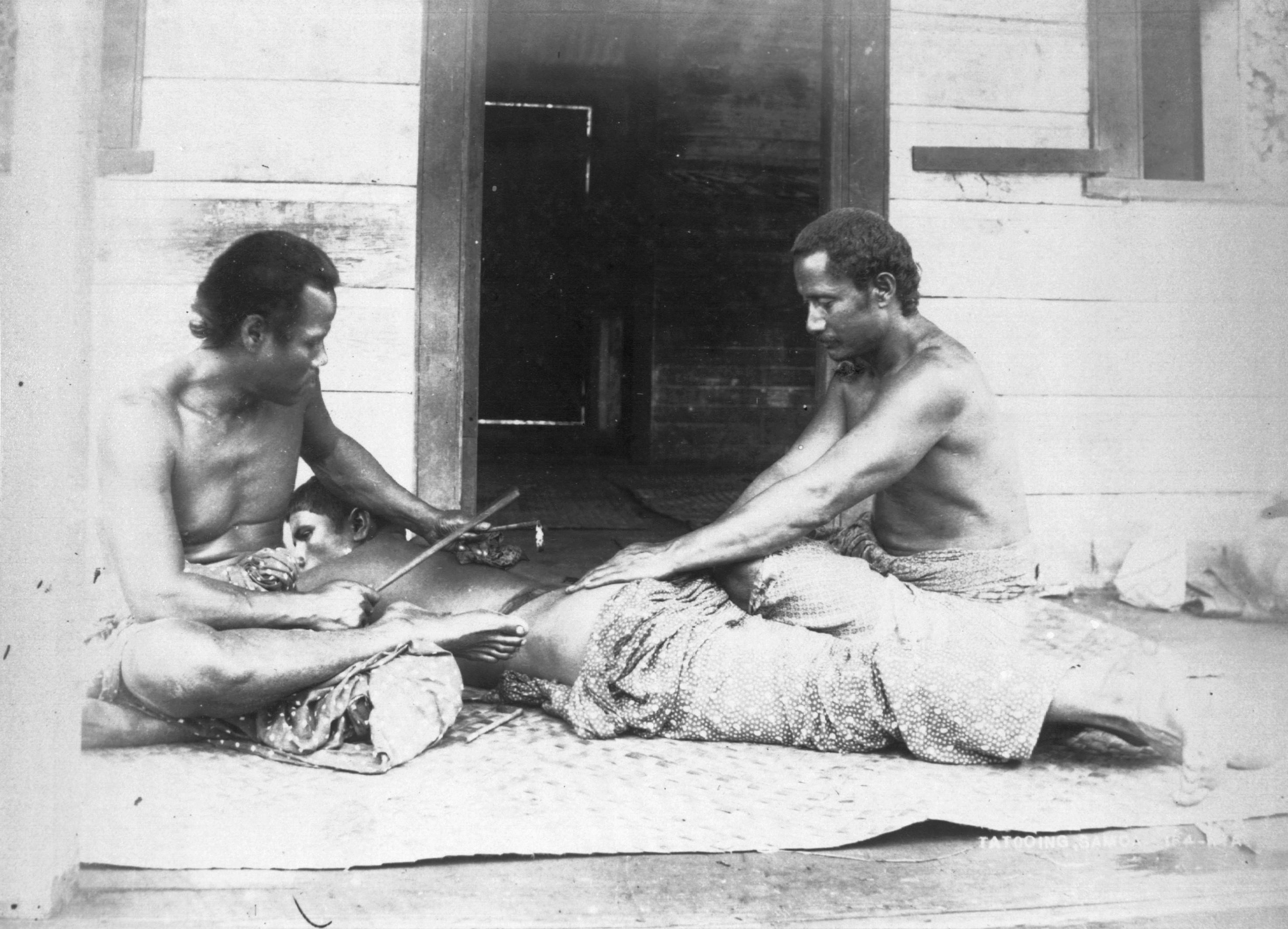
Samoan traditional tattooist (tufuga ta tatau), c 1895

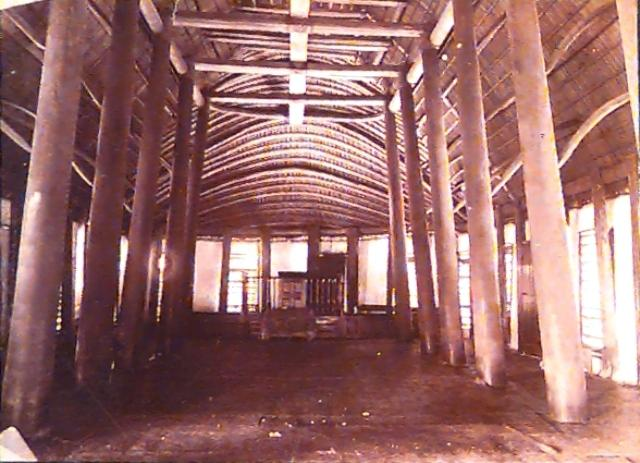
Interior of church building in Niue, 1896.

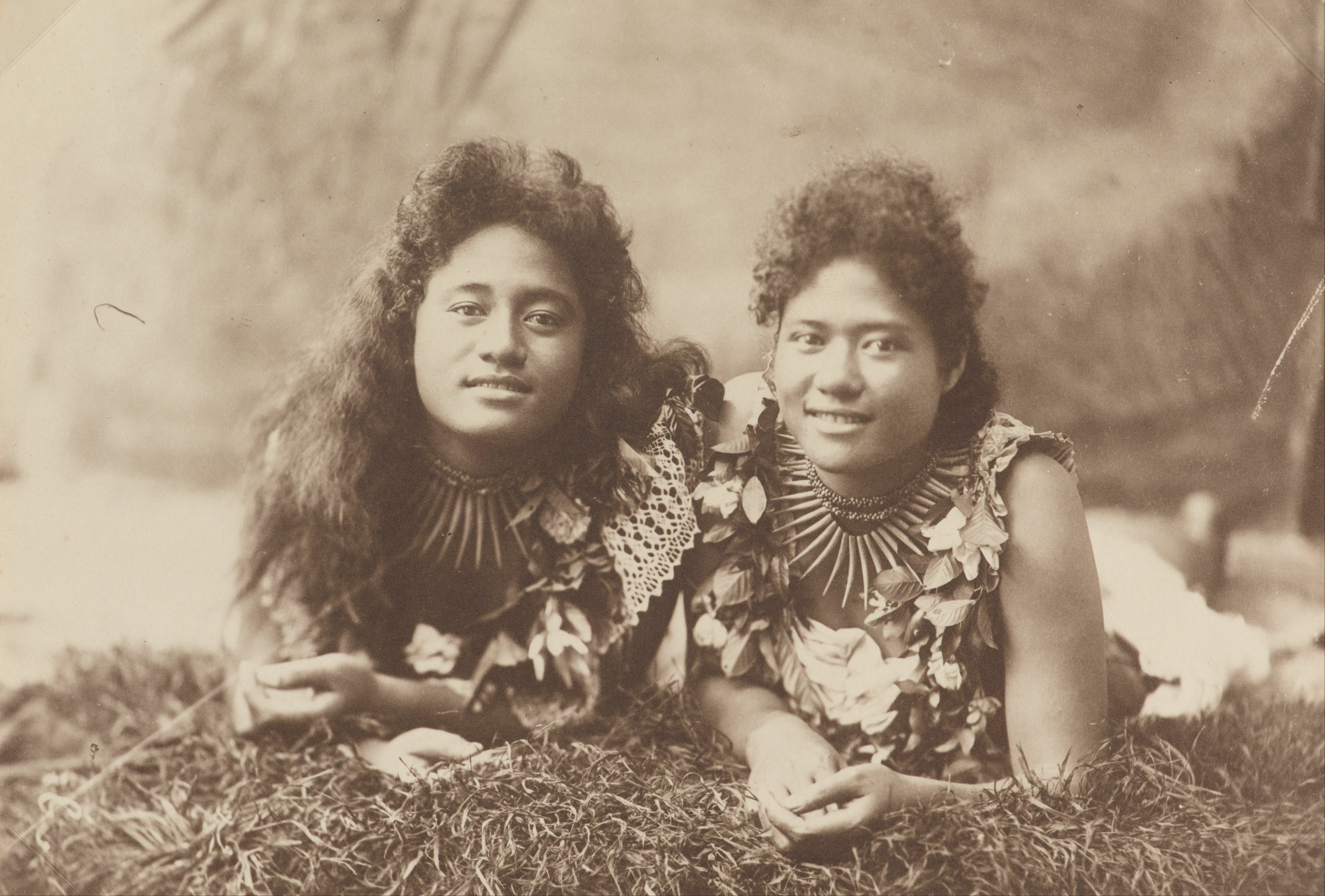
Two leaf-clad women, 1905.
