= Falelima =

- Village
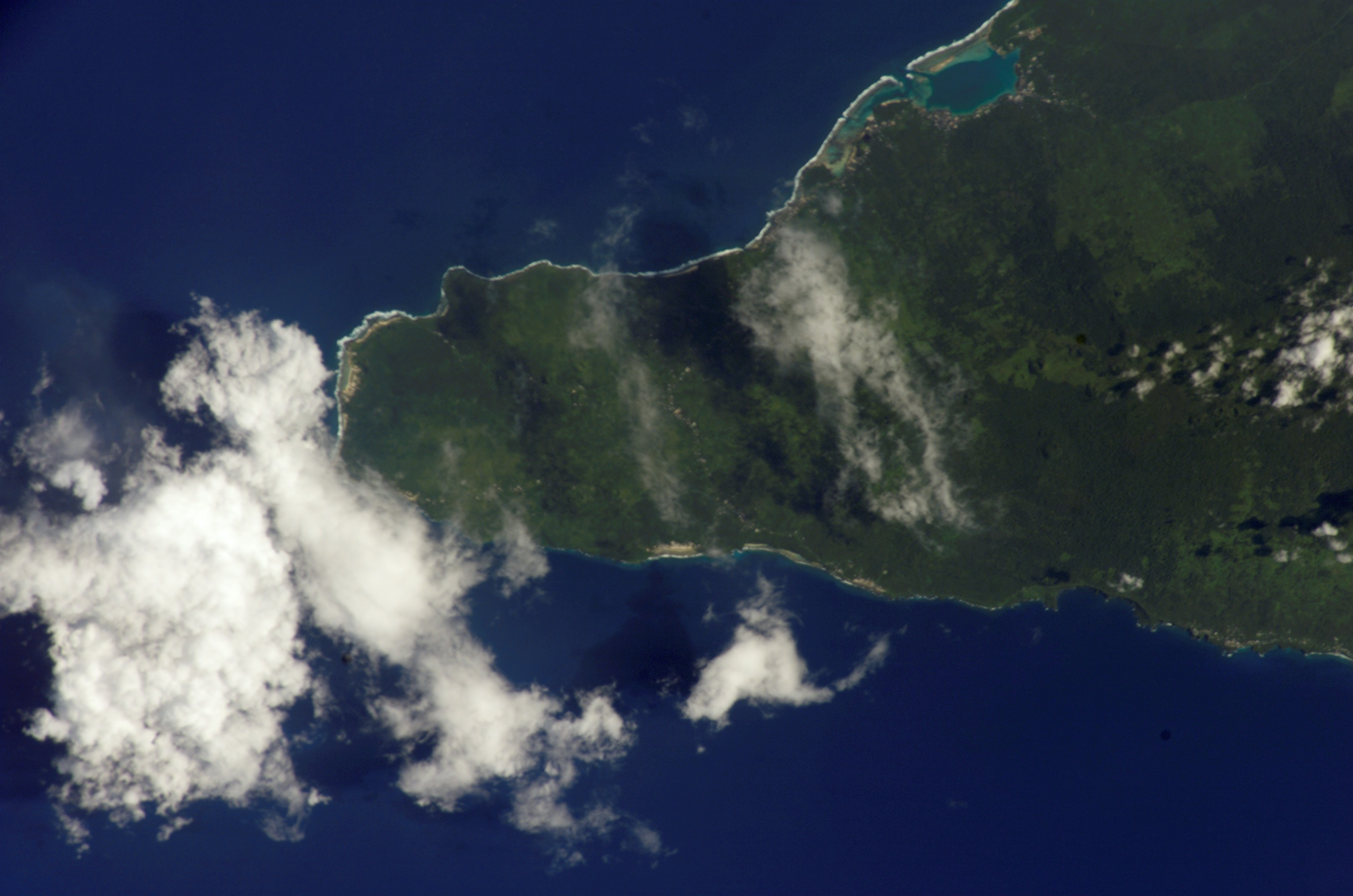
- Satellite image of western end of Savai'i with Falelima on the south coast. (NASA photo, 2002)

- Location within Samoa
- Coordinates: 13°34′5″S 172°44′11″W
- Country: Samoa
- District: Vaisigano

Population (2016)
  - Total: 412
- Time zone: -11

Falelima is a village on the southwest corner of Savai'i island in Samoa. The village is part of the electoral constituency (Faipule District) Alataua West which forms part of the larger political district of Vaisigano. The village's population is 412.

== Mythology ==
In Samoan mythology, the village of Falelima is associated with a powerful spirit called Nifoloa.

The following is an explanation of the myth told in the words of Samoan historian Teo Tuvale (1855–1919) in the publication An Account of Samoan History up to 1918.

The Long Toothed Devil of Falelima. In the village of Falelima there dwelt a powerful devil who was possessed of a long tooth. After the death of this devil who was called Nifoloa (Long Tooth), the tooth continued to grow and ultimately extended under the earth to all parts of the neighbouring island of Upolu. Many people were bitten by this tooth and the bite caused a bad sore, the evidences of which remain when the sore has healed. People who are bitten by this tooth are referred to as Nifoloa.
