= Tilafaiga =

Samoan mythology character

According to a legend in Samoan mythology Tilafaiga was one of the twin sisters who brought the art of tatau (Samoan tattoo) to Samoa from Fiji. Tilafaiga's twin sister's name is Taema.

Tilafaiga and Taema can also be referred to as the Matriarchs of the Samoan tatau.

Tilafaiga is the mother of Nafanua, the famous Samoan Warrior Princess, whose father was Saveasi'uleo the Ali'i of the spirit underworld Pulotu.

== See also ==
- Polynesian mythology
