= Masausi, American Samoa =

Village in American Samoa

Masausi
- Village
- Etymology: "Place of coral" in Samoan
- Interactive map of Masausi
- Location within American Samoa
- Coordinates: 14°15′34″S 170°36′19″W
- Country: United States
- Territory: American Samoa
- District: Eastern

Population (2020)
  - Total: 134

Masausi (lit. 'place of coral' in Samoan) is a village in the Eastern District of American Samoa. As of the 2020 US census, the population of Masausi was 134. The village is known for its coral tattooing tools.

The Masausi Village Marine Protected Area covers the waters around Masausi and is co-managed by the village and the American Samoa Government.

== History ==
In the late 19th century, a chief from Masausi sought to marry a woman from Fagasā. When his proposal was turned down, he rallied a group of warriors from Masausi and launched an attack on Fagasā, burning down two traditional dwellings (fales). The US commandant responded by capturing and prosecuting the attackers. Consequently, those convicted were sentenced to work on road construction, and individuals holding government positions were removed from their offices.

American archaeologists Terry Hunt and Patrick Kirch visited a site in Masausi labelled AS-23-7 in 1986. They excavated two artifacts along the coast, between the Vaipito and Panota streams.

In 2000, the American Samoa Government established the Community-Based Fisheries Management Program, in which villages could volunteer to work alongside the government in managing and conserving inshore fisheries. Masausi was among a dozen villages that had participated in the program by 2016, and a Village Marine Protected Area was created for the waters around Masausi.

== Geography ==
Masausi is connected by road to Fagaʻitua to the west and Saʻilele to the east.

The waters extending from the village's beach are a protected area known as the Masausi Village Marine Protected Area.

== Demographics ==
The 2020 US census recorded a population of 134 people.

== Culture ==
Masausi means "place of coral" in the Samoan language. The village is known for its locals' use of coral tattooing tools.
