= Ila (Samoan mythology) =

In Samoan mythology, Ila was the first woman on Tutuila (American Samoa). She was created by Tagaloa and her husband was Tutu. In another legend, Tutu and Ila escaped a war in the Manuʻa Islands and repopulated Tutuila.
