= Faʻatiu =

Polynesian wind and storm god

In Samoan mythology Faʻatiu is the wind and storm god. In one Samoan legend, Tiʻitiʻi imprisons the winds one by one in his canoe or calabash, leaving only Fisaga free.

== See also ==
- Tāwhirimātea
