= Laʻa Maomao =

Hawaiian god of the wind

Laʻamaomao
- God of the wind and forgiveness
- Venerated in: Hawaiian religion
- Major cult centre: Hale-o-Lono
- Artifacts: Gourd containing the winds of Hawaiʻi
- Region: Molokaʻi

In Hawaiian mythology, Laʻamaomao is the goddess of the wind, she carried a gourd that contains all the winds of Hawaiʻi, "which could be called forth by chanting their names", the gourd was passed down by

Laʻamaomao, the Hawaiian wind goddess (lit. "distant sacredness"), to her granddaughter Laʻamaomao; to her granddaughter's son Pakaʻa; to Pakaʻa's son, Ku-a-Pakaʻa. In "The Triple Marriage of Laa-Mai-Kahiki" (Kalākaua, The Legends and Myths of Hawaii), Laʻamaomao is described as a god rather than a goddess. He accompanies Moikeha to Hawaiʻi from Kahiki and settles at Hale-o-Lono on the island of Molokaʻi, where he was worshiped as an ʻaumakua, or deity, of the winds. The female gender of the wind deity in the Pakaʻa story seems to be a Hawaiian development as the wind deity in other Polynesian traditions is male (Raʻa—Society Islands, Raka—Cook Islands, Raka-maomao—New Zealand).

The male version of the wind divinity was said to be created in the midst of chaos by his father, the sun god. Largely a benevolent entity, he is the god of forgiveness.

== See also ==
- Raka Maomao
- Fa'atiu
