= Samoan mythology =

Mythology of the Samoan Archipelago

Samoan culture tells stories of many different deities. There were deities of the forest, the seas, rain, harvest, villages, and war. There were two types of deities, atua, who had non-human origins, and aitu, who were of human origin.

Tagaloa was a supreme god who made the islands and the people. Mafuiʻe was the god of earthquakes. There were also a number of war deities. Nafanua, Samoa's warrior goddess hails from the village of Falealupo at the western end of Savai'i island, which is also the site of the entry into Pulotu, the spirit world. She also is regarded as a peace bringer, having brought peace to Savai'i through winning the wars between the two regions of the island. Tilafaiga is the mother of Nafanua. Nafanua's father, Saveasi'uleo, was the god of Pulotu. Another well-known legend tells of two sisters, Tilafaiga, the mother of Nafanua, and Taema, bringing the art of tattooing to Samoa from Fiji.

A figure of another legend is Tui Fiti, who resides at Fagamalo village in the village district of Matautu. The village of Falelima is associated with a dreaded spirit deity called, Nifoloa. The Mata o le Alelo 'Eyes of the Demon' freshwater pool from the Polynesian legend Sina and the Eel is situated in the village of Matavai on the northern coast in the village district of Safune.

Fetu ("star") is the god of the night. His wife is Ele'ele.

Samoan mythology is a variant of a more general Polynesian mythology in the Samoa Islands.

== Prominent entries on Samoan mythology ==
- Afa
- Aitu
- Atonga
- Atu
- Atua
- ‘Ava
- Fa'asega
- Faʻatiu
- Fe’e
- Filele
- Fisaga
- Gai’o
- Ila
- Lefue
- Leutogi
- Losi
- Mafuiʻe
- Moaula
- Moso's Footprint
- Mulianalafai
- Nafanua
- Nifoloa
- Ol-i-nano
- Olokeu
- Pau
- Pe’a
- pōlu
- Pulotu
- Sā
- Sāuma’iafe
- Sava
- Savali
- Saveasiʻuleo
- Sina and the Eel
- Taema
- Tagaloa
- Taoulupo'o
- Tapu
- Tapuitea
- Te’e
- Teine Sā
- Telesā
- Tinilau
- Tiʻitiʻi
- Tilafaiga
- Tui Fiti
- Tūli
- Tutū
- ‘Ū
- Upolu
- Vā
- vai’i
- vavē

== See also ==
- Culture of Samoa
- Hawaiian religion
- Cook Islanders religion
- Samoan proverbs
- Religion in Samoa
