= Io Matua Kore =

Supreme being in Polynesian native religion

Io-matua-kore
- Creator of creators; Parentless one; Supreme being
- Other names: Io-nui; Io-matua-te-kore; Io-te-waiora-o-ngā-mea-katoa; Io-taketake-o-ngā-mea-katoa; Io-matua-o-ngā-mea-katoa; Io-wānanga-o-ngā-rangi
- Gender: Male
- Region: Polynesia

Io Matua Kore is often understood as the supreme being in Polynesian native religion, particularly of the Māori people.

Io does seem to be present in the mythologies of other Polynesian islands including Hawai‘i, the Society Islands, and the Cook Islands. He, or somebody else with his name, appears as a great-grandson of Tiki, and a father of another Io-rangi in Moriori mythology.

== Controversy ==
Io was first known generally with the publication in 1913 of Hoani Te Whatahoro Jury's book, translated by Percy Smith as The Lore of the Whāre-wananga. The idea that the Io represented a pre-Christian understanding of "God" much like the Christian God would be propagated by Elsdon Best in his Maori Religion and Mythology.

The Io tradition was initially rejected by scholars including prominent Māori scholar Te Rangi Hīroa (Peter Buck), who wrote, "The discovery of a supreme God named Io in New Zealand was a surprise to Māori and Pākehā alike." Buck believed that the Io tradition was restricted to the Ngāti Kahungunu as a response to Christianity. Jonathan Z. Smith questions the motives behind the existence of such a book, seeing this as a questionable emphasis of the idea around the Io. Others such as James Cox argues that this "pre-Christian" understanding of a supreme god may in fact be due to the earlier Mormon missionary activities.

== See also ==
- Ao (mythology)
- Kiho-tumu
- Mataaho
- Tagaloa paramount deity in Samoan mythology
- Taʻaroa paramount deity in Tahitian mythology
