= Teine Sā =

In Samoan mythology, the Teine Sā are spirits (aitu), who wander around both the human, and spiritual world. They are one of the group of spirits coming from the times before Samoa became a christian nation who shared the island group with wildlife.

== Legend ==
Teine Sā are spirit woman who guard villages in Samoa, the most notable one being Telesa from Lepea in Upolu. Teine Sā are children of Gods (atua) and humans, but are neither. They are beautiful creatures who like to lure men they love. They have been known to sexually seduce young men and become jealous of girls who had beautiful long hair. They also envied girls who had a hibiscus in their hair, lipstick or red painted nails. In Samoan superstition, they attacked girls who brushed their hair, dyed it, or wore it down. Another way to lure the Teine Sā is by leaving the mirror in your bedroom uncovered during the night, as they loom over your head in your reflection. They also attacked woman who interact with the men they want. Sexually active girls were also known to be possessed by the Teine Sā; they acted thoughtless and excessive, and wear colorful clothes and put their hair down in a disobedient way.

Victims of the Teine Sā may experience hair loss, loss of sanity, possession and even death. Offerings are often placed where the Teine Sā roam. People have seen items move, and voices calling their name. It is important in Samoan culture to say hello to the places they roam and not wander around in those areas. It was also important to cover your mirror during sunset with a cloth and avoid walking around with your hair down at night so the Teine Sā would avoid you.

== Media ==
A horror series named after the legend (Teine Sā: The ancient ones) showcases 5 goddesses now in the modern world, cross pathing with 5 other woman and helping with their struggles, and learning lessons in the process.
