= Tagaloa =

Deity in Samoan mythology

- Chief of the Gods, God of Sun and Sky
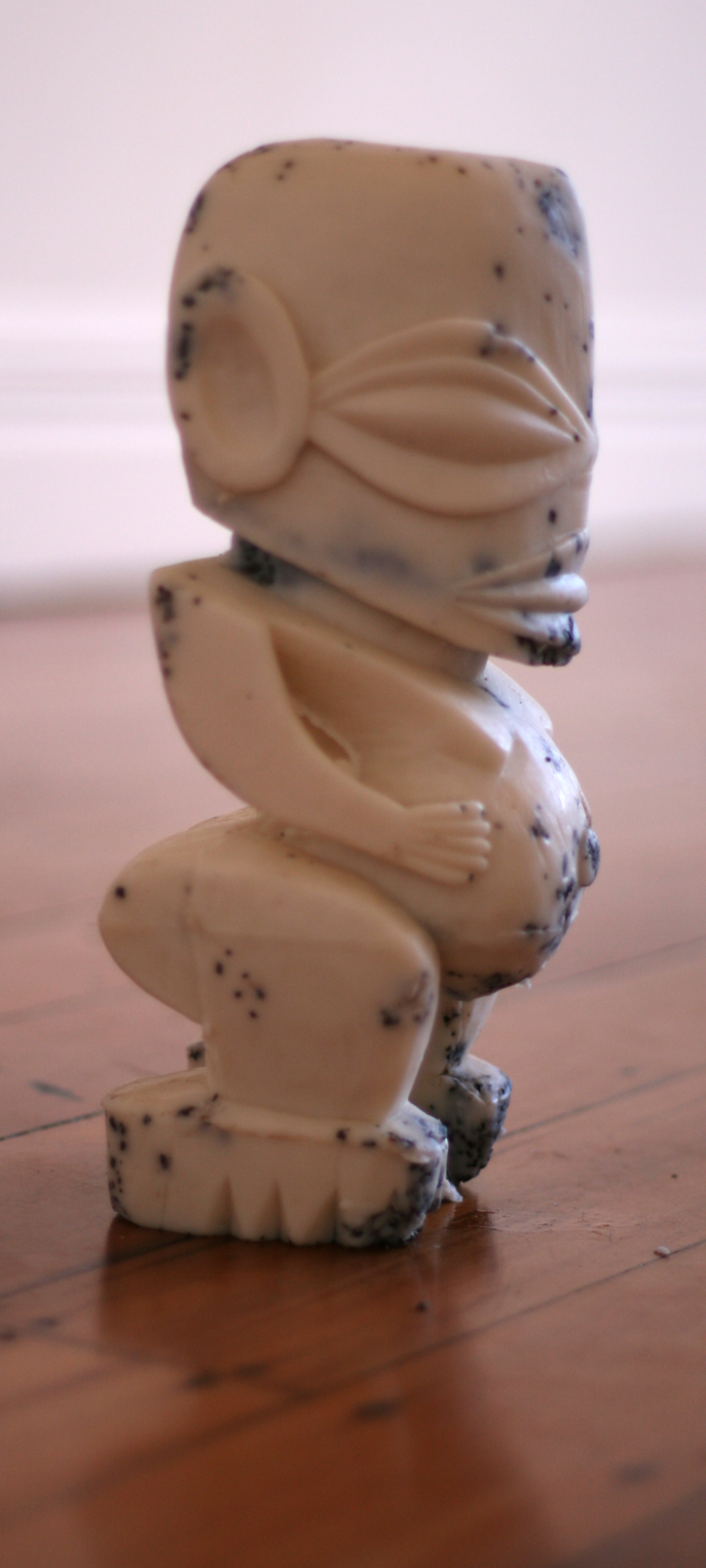
- A Tagaloa statue made by Paula Schaafhausen.
- Abode: Outer Space

Genealogy
- Children: Moa, Lu, Alo'alo

In Samoan mythology, Tagaloa (also known as Tagaloa-Lagi or Tagaloa, Lagi of the Heavens/Skies) is generally accepted as the supreme ruler, the creator of the universe, the chief of all gods and the progenitor of other gods. Tagaloa Lagi dwelt in space and made the Heavens the sky, the land, the seas, the fresh water, the trees and the people. Samoans believed Tagaloa created nine heavens. Tagaloa's role as paramount deity in the Samoa pantheon bears similarities to the position of Ta'aroa in Tahiti and Io Matua Kore in New Zealand.

The arrival of missionaries and Christianity in Samoa from 1830 saw the Samoan Lagi gods like Tagaloa replaced by the Christian deity. Or rather, the acceptance of the Christian God, Ieova/Jehovah, by the Samoan people can be seen as an expansion or extension of their spiritual hierarchy, where the god Tagaloa and all the gods beneath him are now seen by the Samoan people as being subject to the dominion of the Judeo-Christian God. Otherwise, the still existing traditional family genealogies (which include the old religious hierarchy within them) and culture of Samoa would be meaningless and dead.

Another interpretation is that the Samoans simply recognized the "christian" God as Tagaloa by another name, and saw Jesus and other dessert, dry Tropical stories as being interpreations by other peoples.

The worship of Tagaloa predates the arrival of both Christianity and Islam.

== Tagaloa in mythology ==
Tagaloa features in many of Samoa's myths and legends.

- Tagaloa rolled stones from heaven. One became the island Savai'i and the other stone became the island of Upolu.
- One legend tells that Tagaloa had two children, a son Moa and a daughter Lu. Tagaloa's daughter Lu had a son, also called Lu. Young Lu argued with his uncle Moa and fled to earth which he called Samoa.
- Tagaloa is the father of gods Lagi
- Tagaloa is a sun god whose son Alo'alo married Sina, the daughter of Tuifiti. There is a legend about a figure called Tui Fiti in the village of Fagamalo on the island of Savai'i.
- In Manu'a, Tagaloa sent a vine to earth that resulted in maggots which became human beings.
- Tagaloa brought a war god called Fe'e (octopus) to Manu'a
- In Samoan architecture, Tagaloa also features in a story which explains why Samoan houses are round.

== See also ==
- Io Matua Kore paramount deity in New Zealand Māori mythology
- Taʻaroa paramount deity in Tahitian mythology
- Tangaloa Tongan mythology
- Tangaroa New Zealand Maori mythology
- Kanaloa Hawaii mythology
