= Māui (Christian convert) =

Māui (Mowee in traditional orthography) was a pioneering traveller from the southern Bay of Islands, who also lived on Norfolk Island, with Samuel Marsden at Parramatta, and in London. Literate and very interested in religion and mathematics, Māui enthusiastically engaged with British culture and Christianity until his death in London in December 1816.

He was the first Māori person to be baptised as Christian, following the arrival in New Zealand of missionaries such as Marsden. He was aged 8 or 9 when he was baptised.
