= Nafanua =

Queen and warrior of Samoa

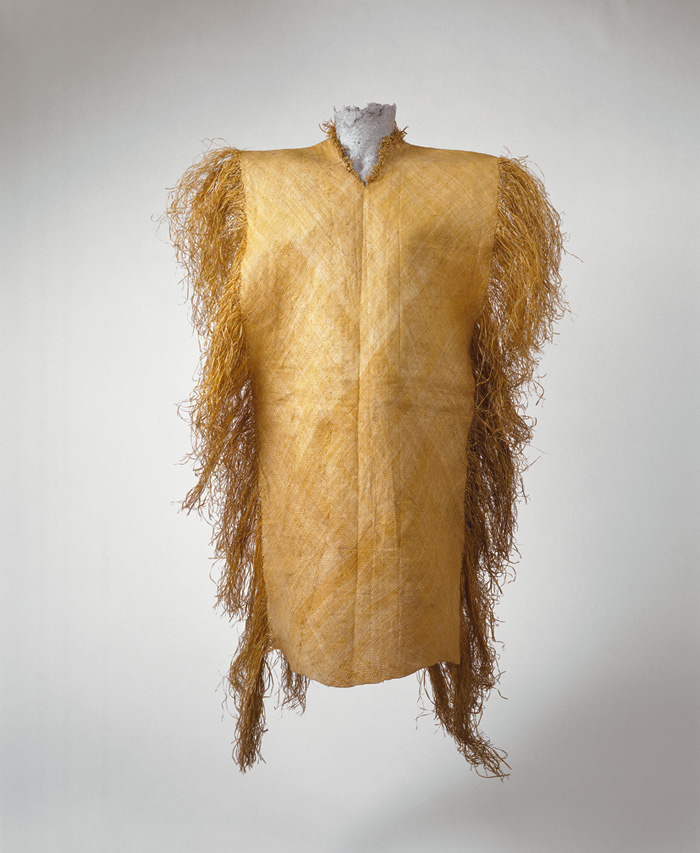
Example of a tiputa (shirt), similar to the one worn by Nafanua during the wars

Nafanua was a historical aliʻi (Paramount Chief/Queen) and toa (warrior) of Samoa from the Sā Tonumaipeʻa clan, who secured the four pāpā (district) titles, the leading aliʻi titles of Samoa, to become the first Tafaʻifa (highest title given to the holder of all four titles). Following her death, she was deified as the goddess of war within Polynesian religion.

There are historical and mythological traditions about Nafanua's family and life. She reportedly played a crucial role in the civil wars between the districts of eastern and western Savaiʻi.

== Biography ==
According to Samoan mythology, she was the daughter of Saveasiʻuleo, also considered a demigod, the Aliʻi of Pulotu. Pulotu was both a historical place, and a place of the afterlife for the warriors of Samoa (comparable to the Viking concept of Valhalla). In one tradition, Nafanua's mother was Tilafaiga the sister of Taema, the legendary conjoined twins, whom brought the malu tattoo to Samoa.

Nafanua was bestowed the title of Toa/Toa Tamaʻitaʻi (or Warrior Princess) for avenging her uncle and bringing peace to Savaiʻi through military victories. Her village was located on the western side of the island of Savaiʻi.

During Nafanua's time, the eastern and western sides of Savaiʻi were engaged in a war for the land and title of the entire island. In Samoan culture, a family is more prestigious if they own a lot of land; and family members (especially males) receive greater titles and a bigger share of the land. According to oral tradition, when High Chief Lilomaiava caught anyone from the east side on the west side of the island, he would force them to climb a coconut tree upside-down as a public punishment

One of the villagers that Lilomaiava caught was Taʻiʻi, the uncle of Nafanua and the older brother of Saveasiʻuleo. Taʻiʻi was punished and was forced to climb the coconut tree feet first. As he was climbing the coconut tree, the pain and humiliation caused him to sigh loudly. Taʻiʻi's sighs were overheard by Saveasiʻuleo and Nafanua. This made Savesiʻuleo angry; consequently he told Nafanua to prepare for war and to cut down the Toa tree. The wood from the tree was to be used to make weapons to drive away Lilomaiava and his army.

She made the following four weapons from the Toa (also known as Koa) wood. They are as follows:

1. Ta Fesilafaʻi - This was her first and primary weapon and she used it most of the time during the battle. It is shaped like a wide hook facing side out and has three to four pointed sharp teeth facing side ways. During wartime, this weapon is plain and not painted or decorated.
2. Faʻauliʻulito - This is the weapon that Nafanua had made and given to Matuna and Matuna to use while fighting. She asked them to attack the enemy from the side, so that she could meet the enemy in the middle and try to reach a compromise of peace and harmony. She warned Matuna and Matuna to be careful as it was difficult for her to spot the enemy. As for the shape of the weapon, it looks like a plain stick but has a rounded, thick, heavy and wide edge.
3. Ulimasao - This weapon is considered a stand-by weapon to be used to end war and bring peace. The word "Ulimasao" also means driving safely. It is shaped like a canoe paddle with round, smooth sides and one pointed edge.
4. Faʻamategataua - This weapon is a second reserve weapon and is considered to be the most dangerous weapon of them all. In fact, according to the late Silivelio Suafoʻa (orator of this legend), this war club was never meant to be used. It was fortunate that Nafanua did not need to use the fourth weapon called “Weapon of Death”. Legend has it that it is so powerful that if used it would kill everyone including her family. This weapon is shaped like a spear but has teeth on both sides. The number of teeth varies from five to seven.

These weapons are now considered the traditional Samoan weapons, and are used today more so as decorative objects.

The war ended because Nafanua's apana (shirt) was blown upward by the wind revealing her breasts. Up to this time the men did not know she was a woman. When they discovered that she was a woman, they decided to end the war. They felt humiliated because there was only one woman among several men fighting the war.

Immediately Nafanua cut down the Toa tree and left it there to dry. A few days later, she returned to the area where the Toa tree was cut and discovered that the tree had attracted many Pule (seashells). "E gase toa ae ola pule". Literally this means that the shells are living but the Toa tree is dead. But metaphorically speaking, although we have great strength and power as human beings, we do not succeed if we do not have wisdom to make a good, solid decision. It takes courage to make wise decisions.

Before leaving for battle Saveasiʻuleo ordered Nafanua, "A pāʻia le pa i Fuālaga, aʻe le tuli 'auā le Aliʻi o Aiga". This translates to Nafanua being ordered to stop the killing when she reached the village of Fualaga. Over the course of battle, Nafanua forced the enemy back to the border of their own territory. One tradition holds that she forgot her father's order, and it was only when the wind blew strong enough to lift her tiputa (coverings) that she remembered. The enemy warriors surrendered in shame when they realised that they had been outclassed by a woman. There are a few different interpretations of some of the events, but Nafanua is widely accepted in Polynesia as one of the greatest warriors.

After her victory, Nafanua took possession of the four major chiefly titles of the district: Tui Atua, Tui Aʻana, Gatoʻaitele, and Tamasoaliʻi, reconstituting the faʻamatai (chiefly system of government) that continues in Samoa today.

== Falealupo ==
In Samoa, the village of Falealupo on the western side of Savaiʻi served as the home of Nafanua. Falealupo is also the site of the entryway into the spirit world Pulotu. Often chiefs from distant villages and islands would come to Falealupo to seek Nafanua's blessings before beginning any military adventure. In 1989, the Chiefs and Orators of Falealupo bestowed the title of Nafanua on ethnobotanist Paul Alan Cox for his conservation efforts in protecting the Samoan rainforest. The title was formally registered with the Samoan Lands and Title Court.

It was in Falealupo, one tradition holds, that Nafanua foretold the coming of Christianity. After years of war, Malietoa Fitisemanu wanted to unite Samoa and end the bloodshed, so he came to Nafanua. After many days, Nafanua prophesied onto Malietoa Fitisemanu, "Faʻatali i lagi se ao o lou malo" ("Wait upon heaven, a crown for your kingdom"). In 1830, the missionary John Williams arrived on the shores (mataniʻu feagaimaleata) of Sapapaliʻi and brought the Bible from his boat into the hands of Malietoa Vainuʻupo, the son of Malietoa Fitisemanu. Thus, Malietoa Vainuʻupo became known as "the King whom Samoa listens to". King Malietoa became one of the kings of Samoa and he was instrumental in uniting all of Samoa. These events were considered by many to have fulfilled Nafanua's prophecy.

== Other references ==
- Nafanua Volcano, an active underwater volcanic cone in American Samoa
- Nafanua is the name of a Pacific Forum patrol vessel operated by the Western Samoa Police Department. It was provided to Western Samoa by the Australian Government as part of the Pacific Patrol Boat Program.
- Nafanua, the name of the Congregational Christian Church of Samoa - Avondale, Auckland, New Zealand.

== See also ==
- Military of Samoa
- History of Samoa
- Salamasina
