= Kiho-tumu =

Supreme god in Polynesian mythology

In the mythology of the Tuamotu archipelago, Kiho-tumu (or Kiho) represents the supreme god (Sykes and Kendall 2003:108).

The Milky Way is said to be his 'sacred ocean' and the dark rift within the Milky Way is referred to as his sacred ship, called 'the Long Shark' (Beckwith 1970:236).

On the other hand, research by anthropologist Kenneth Emory led him to doubt the reliability of Stimson's sources:

These details concerning the principal informants for the esoteric cult of Kio or Kiho, coming to my attention, have made it more and more difficult for me to accept their accounts and esoteric versions of chants, unsupported by trustworthy confirmation. Both Bishop Paul Mazé and I have earnestly searched for corroboration and have not only failed to find any, but have come across so much reliable contrary evidence (now on file at the Bishop Museum) that we are left completely without faith in the cult.

== See also ==
- Io Matua Kore
