= Mafuiʻe =

Samoan god of earthquakes

In Samoan mythology, Mafuiʻe is the god of earthquakes. He dwells in the volcanic regions below the Earth, and has only one arm.

Mafuiʻe was also the keeper of fire. Tiʻitiʻi, a demigod, won the fire from him in a battle, thus introducing fire to the people of Samoa.

== See also ==
- Mahuika
