= Samoan proverbs =

Samoan proverbs form an important part of the traditions and culture of Samoa where oratory, poetry, metaphors and subtlety in language art forms are held in high esteem as a form of communication in ceremony and ritual of fa'a Samoa. The importance of oratory is reflected in Samoa's indigenous chiefly system, fa'a Matai, where titleholders are either ali'i or orator (tulafale) status.

== List of Proverbs ==
These Samoan proverbs are taken from the first Samoan dictionary, A grammar and dictionary of the Samoan language, with English and Samoan vocabulary, first published in 1862. The proverbs were collected and authored by Rev George Pratt, an English missionary from the London Missionary Society who lived in Samoa for 40 years, mostly in Matautu on the central north coast of Savai'i Island.

Following is a list of proverbs in the Samoan language and their meanings in the English language.

- Ia lafoia i le fogavaʻa tele.

Let it be thrown on the deck of the large canoe. A deprecatory saying of a speaker.

- ʻO le fogavaʻa e tasi.

One family.

- Ua iloa i vaʻa lelea.

Of one seldom seen.

- Ua le seʻi mau se ala vaʻa.

Why not steer a straight course? Applied to a speech having no definite proposition.

- Ua mele le manu e Afono.

Afono made light of his prosperity.

- E pogai i vao, a e liaʻi i ala.

It grew in the bush, but it is cast away in the road.

- ʻO lalo ifi lenei.

This is a secret; lit., This is under the chestnut tree. this means hide things not to be remembered forever

- ʻO le puta i Tufa.

Only a threat.

- Tuʻu ia ma paga.

In the game of tatia when counted wrongly; applied to anything not paid for.

- Ua se vaʻa tu matagi.

Of anything quick, like a canoe before the wind.

- Ua usiusi-faʻavaʻasavili.

To obey like a canoe before the wind.

- Ua le seʻi seu faʻaʻalo.

To request to be respectful; lit., Why do you not steer out of the way?

- Ia tala mea faʻasolo (of seuga-lupe, pigeon snaring).

To dismiss an assembly.

- Fale-taeao e le afiafi.

Who sits at home in the morning will not eat in the evening. Of a lazy person.

- Taliu ae popoʻe.

Of one who is afraid out at sea. He bails out the canoe, but is afraid.

- Ua le faasinopu le tautuʻu palapala.

A reference to the work of digging tupa. Applied to lazy people who do not help at work.

- E le fono paʻa mona vae.

The crab did not consult with its legs that they should pinch; they did it of themselves. Applied to youths who get into trouble without consulting the elders.

- ʻO le lima e paia le mata.

(literally) The hand strikes the eye. Of one who brings trouble on himself.

- ʻO le toʻotoʻo sinasina.

A white staff; i.e. a new speaker.

- ʻO le toʻotoʻo uliuli.

A black staff; i.e., an old speaker.

- E logo le tuli ona tata.

The deaf hears when he is tapped.

- E pata le tutu i ona vae.

The crab blusters on his feet; a boy blusters when he knows his father is near.

- Na ʻo gata e fasi a vaʻai.

The snake when about to be killed looks but does not escape. Said of one blamed before his face.

- E sola le fai, ae tuʻu lona foto.

The skate swims away, but leaves its barb.

- E le pu se tino i upu.

Words don't break bones.

- E pala le maʻa, a e le pala upu.

Stones rot but not words.

- Amuia le masina, e alu ma sau.

(literally) Blessed is the moon which goes and returns! Men die and return not.

- ʻO le ua na fua mai Manuʻa.

The rain came from Manuʻa. Spoken of a thing long known beforehand, and yet unprepared for.

- Uu tuʻu maʻa, a e maʻa i aʻau.

The crabs left the stone, and took a piece of the reef.

- Ua solo le lava-lima.

To be prosperous.

- ʻO le ʻumu ua vela.

Of one who does many things for his country.

- ʻO le sola a Faleata.

Does not run far, but returns.

- ʻO le a sosopo le manu vale i le foga-tia.

The foolish bird passes over the tiʻa. Applied by one of himself when speaking before great chiefs.

- ʻO le fogatiʻa ua malu maunu.

Of one who calls in to get food.

- Punapuna a manu fou.

To begin heartily and finish weakly.

- Ua se vi a toli.

Applied to a number falling in a clubbing match.

- E i o le ua tafunaʻi.

The rain carried by the wind to leeward. Applied to toilalo party.

- Ia fili e le tai se agavaʻa.

Let the wind choose as to the quickness of a canoe.

- Se a lou manoginogi.

Spoken to a man of bad conduct. His conduct is no more fragrant.

- E lutia i Puava, a e mapu i Fagalele.

Hard-pressed paddling in Puava, but at rest in Fagalele.

- Ua tagi le fatu ma le eleele.

The stones and the earth weep. Applied to the death of a beloved chief.

- Ua lelea le laumea.

The dry leaves are carried away by the wind. Of troops routed.

- Sei logo ia Moo.

Make it known to Moo.

- Ua o Tapatapao le fealuaʻi.

A myth of a mountain that went backwards and forwards between Upolu and Savaiʻi.

- Ia tupu i se fusi.

May you grow in a swamp, i.e.. quickly. A prayer of a father for his son.

- ʻO le ola e taupule-esea.

Our lives are decreed to be taken by the gods.

- E ese ea le aitu, ese le moemu?

Is the aitu different from the moemu? Doing something wrong under another name.

- Tapai tataga le pilia. “Little pitchers have ears;”

(literally), Don't let lizards go near when getting afato, because they will eat them. Applied to children present at conversation of grown people.

- E tuai tuai, ta te maʻona ai.

It is very long coming, but will be satisfying. Of an oven of food long in preparation, but satisfying. Applied generally to expected but delayed good.

- ʻO le mama ma le ponoi.

A mouthful and a blow; or of a canoe both leaky and with the waves coming in. Applied to one over-burdened with different tasks.

- Ua mua ane lava se fale.

First of all a house. Applied to one having neither strength nor means, but who talks of building a house.

- Ua o Leaʻea, He is like Leaʻea.

Leaʻea shook the bonito off his hook back into the sea. Applied to those rejecting good things when offered.

- Ia e vae a Vaeau.

Let your feet be those of Vaeau (who went to heaven and back in a day); i.e., Be quick.

- Ua o le malaga i Oloolo.

It is like the journey of Oloolo. Applied to a thing proposed to be done, but yet left undone. (A Samoan myth.)

- Ua se ana.

Of something promised, but not given.

- A fai ea aʻu mou titi seesee.

Am I to be your old ti-leaf girdle? Said to one constantly begging.

- Ua ola ipiniu.

They used cups for fish-baskets; because there were so few fish caught.

- E toa e le loto, a e pa le noo.

Strong in heart, but broken in the back. Of a man whose will is stronger than his body.

- Lua mata to ese.

Two taro planted away; i.e., Better have a small plantation of your own than be joined with another.

- E le papeva se upu.

Not a word stumbles.

- Aniui, Anini, Aveavai.

The town Anini was burning, and Aveavai said it served them right, for they were thieves; but the fire spread to Aveavai, and they, too, were burned out.

- Ua aofia i le futiafu e tasi.

When the river dries up, water is found only in the bason of the waterfall. Applied to all being of one mind in a council.

- Seʻi luaʻi lou le ʻulu taumamao.

Pick the breadfruits on the far-off branches first. Applied to any work, etc., to be done. Do the most difficult first.

- Tau ina ta ma faʻapoi.

Only threaten and not execute.

- Ia lafoia i le alo galu.

May you be thrown on the bosom of the wave; the front part of the wave where it is easy to swim.

- Ia natia i Fatualavai.

May our fault be hidden in Fatualavai. May we be forgiven.

- Ua se tifitifi.

Of a nimble warrior.

- Ua se moo le sosolo.

He is a lizard crawling. Of a disobedient lad.

- Ua se taʻataʻa a le ala.

Like grass by the roadside. Of one who has no fixed abode.
