= Māui =

Polynesian mythological hero and trickster

Māui or Maui is the great culture hero and trickster in Polynesian mythology. Very rarely was Māui actually worshipped, being less of a deity (demigod) and more of a folk hero. His origins vary from culture to culture, with variation in his parentage, divine status, and the specific form of several major myths, but many of his main exploits remain relatively similar. Bucková's survey of Eastern Polynesian traditions documents that core motifs, such as acquiring fire or manipulating the sun, appear throughout the region but are adapted differently in Mangarevan, Tuamotuan, and New Hebridean versions.

Tales of Māui's exploits and adventures are told throughout most of Polynesia; they can be traced back as far west as islands off New Guinea. Some exploits common to most Polynesian traditions are stealing fire for humans from the underworld, fishing up islands with his magical hook, and capturing the Sun to lengthen the days. There is a great deal of variation in the representations of Māui from nation to nation, from being a handsome young man to being a wise old wandering priest. Although Māui was said to be very rascally or "kolohe", many of his deeds were to better the lives of his fellow people. Variants of the Māui cycle appear further west in the New Hebrides (modern-day Vanuatu), where fieldwork by A. Capell records stories of Maui fishing up islands, contending with spirits, and acquiring fire, but with distinctive local narrative structures unlike those in central Polynesia. Bucková also identifies these New Hebridean accounts as part of a broader constellation of regional adaptations of fire-origin and trickster traditions.

== Māori mythology ==
In Māori mythology, as in other Polynesian traditions, Māui is a culture hero and a trickster, famous for his exploits and cleverness. Māori names of Māui include Māui-tikitiki ("Māui the top-knot"), Māui-tikitiki-a-Taranga ("Māui the top-knot of Taranga"), Māui-pōtiki ("Māui the last born"), and Māui te whare kino ("Māui the house of trouble").

=== Islands of New Zealand ===
Māui's older brothers always refused to let him come fishing with them. One night, he wove for himself a flax fishing line and enchanted it with a karakia to give it strength; to this he attached the magic fish-hook made from the jawbone that his grandmother Murirangawhenua had given him. Then he stowed away in the hull of his brothers' waka (canoe). The next morning, when the waka was too far from land to return, he emerged from his hiding place. His brothers would not lend him any bait, so he struck himself on the nose and baited the hook with his blood. He pulled up a giant fish which would become the North Island of New Zealand, known as Te Ika-a-Māui; the valleys and mountains of the island were made by his brothers chopping up the fish for themselves. In some traditions his waka became the South Island, known as Te Waka a Māui. (Other traditions make the South Island the waka of Aoraki.)

=== Māui brings fire to the world ===
Māui wanted to know where fire came from, so one night he went among the villages of his people and put all the fires out. Māui's mother Taranga, who was their rangatira, said that someone would have to ask Mahuika, the goddess of fire, for more. So Māui (a grandson of Mahuika) offered to go and find her. Mahuika lived in a cave in a burning mountain at the end of the earth. She gave Māui one of her burning fingernails to relight the fires, but Māui extinguished fingernail after fingernail until Mahuika became angry and sent fire to pursue Māui, who survived only by calling upon Tāwhirimātea, the god of weather, to put it out with his rain. Mahuika threw her last nail at Māui, but it missed him and flew into some trees including the māhoe and the kaikōmako. Māui brought back dry sticks of these trees to his village and showed his people how to rub the sticks together and make fire.

=== Māui slows the sun ===
In former days, the sun used to travel quickly across the sky, leaving not enough daylight time for working and eating. Māui proposed to catch the sun and slow it down. Armed with Murirangawhenua's magic jawbone and a large amount of rope, Māui and his brothers journeyed to the east and found the pit where the sun-god Tama-nui-te-rā slept during the night-time. There they tied the ropes into a noose around the pit and built a wall of clay to shelter behind. Tama-nui-te-rā was caught in the noose and Māui struck him with the jawbone until he surrendered and agreed to travel slowly across the sky.

=== The death of Māui ===
Māui's last trick led to his death and involved Hine-nui-te-pō, the goddess of death and the underworld. In an attempt to make mankind immortal by reversing the natural birth process, he transformed into a worm and entered Hine-nui-te-pō's vagina, intending to leave through her mouth while she slept. However, she was awoken by pīwakawaka (fantails) who had burst into laughter at the sight of Māui entering her vagina. Angered, Hine-nui-te-pō crushed Māui to death with the obsidian teeth in her vagina.

== Hawaiian mythology ==
In Hawaiian religion, Māui is a culture hero and ancient chief who appears in several different genealogies. In the Kumulipo he is the son of ʻAkalana and his wife Hina-a-ke-ahi (Hina). This couple has four sons, Māui-mua, Māui-waena, Māui-kiʻikiʻi and Māui-a-kalana. Māui-a-kalana's wife is named Hinakealohaila; his son is Nanamaoa. Māui is one of the Kupua. His name is the same as that of the Hawaiian island Maui, although native tradition holds that it is not named for him directly, but instead named after the son of the Hawaiʻiloa ("discoverer of Hawaiʻi", who was named after Māui himself).

=== Revelator of Birds ===
Māui is said to have caused birds to become visible. In the relevant tale, birds used to be invisible to the naked eye. People could hear birdsong but not see its source. Māui, who could see the birds, made them all visible so that his friends could appreciate their visual beauty as well.

=== Creation of Hawai'i ===
Māui also is credited with the creation of the Hawaiian islands, when he went on a fishing expedition with his friends, and, using a magic fish hook, pulled up various island groups from the oceanic depths. In some versions of the Hawaiian fisherman story, Māui is said to be a bad fisherman. His brothers would mock him for not catching any fish and he would retaliate with mischievous tricks against them. Māui and all his brothers were sons to a divine father and mother but only Māui was granted miraculous powers, which is why Māui was able to possess this magical hook made from the bones of his divine ancestors. One day, his brothers went fishing but would not permit Māui to join them on the canoe, and this irritated Māui. When they returned, Māui told them that, had he gone with them, they would have caught many more fish rather than just a single shark. His brothers considered his remark and then took him out on their next trip. They asked him where all the "good" fish were. Māui then threw in his magical hook baited with Alae birds, sacred to his mother Hina. The ocean floor began to move and generate huge waves while Māui asked his brothers to paddle fast to accommodate for the oncoming fish. They paddled with great power and were getting tired but Māui told them not to look back because if they did the fish would run away. One of the brothers disobeyed and the fishing line snapped, revealing new islands. Had nobody looked back, there would have been more islands.

=== The secret of fire ===
As humans had not yet discovered fire, during Māui's tenure in a land of perpetual volcanic eruptions and fire in the mountaintops, Māui decided that rather than periodically hike for dozens of miles across corals just to obtain glowing embers of the extinguished fires put out the previous night by cold winds, he decided upon a simpler solution. He would bring the fire to him. Māui knew of a tribe of intelligent birds that mastered the art of fire-making. His plan was to capture their leader, and coerce from him the secret of fire. The bird taught him that he should rub certain sticks together in order to produce fire, and this is how the secret of fire was brought to humanity.

=== Tamer of the Sun and the Heavens ===
Before Māui's involvement in the matter, the Sun (Lā) notoriously traveled on irregular paths in the sky, coming and going unexpectedly at times, which made activities such as farming very difficult for man. To this end, Māui crafted snares made of his hair in order to trap the sun and compel it to travel more slowly and adhere to regular courses of travel. In this manner, Māui regulated the sun's activities for the benefit of mankind.

=== Pillar of the Sky ===
Similar to Atlas and Heracles of Greek mythology, Māui lifted up the heavens, which, for a long time, had lain heavily upon the plants of the Earth, leaving insufficient room for growth and for humanity to move about with ease.

== Tongan mythology ==
In the Tongan version of his tales, Māui drew up the Tongan Islands from the deep: first appeared Lofanga and the other Haʻapai Islands, and finally Vavaʻu. Māui then dwelt in Tonga. Māui had two sons: the eldest, Māui-Atalanga, and the younger Māui-Kisikisi. The latter discovered the secret of fire, and taught people the art of cooking food: he made fire dwell in certain kinds of wood. Māui-Motu'a bears the earth on his shoulders, and when he nods in sleep it causes earthquakes, therefore the people have to stamp on the ground to awaken him. Hikule'o, the deity presiding over Pulotu, the underworld, is the youngest son of Māui-Motu'a. Houma is pointed out as the spot where Māui's fish hook caught.

Other sources say that in Tonga there were three Māui brothers: Māui-motuʻa (old Māui), Māui-Atalanga, and Māui-Kisikisi (dragonfly Māui), the last one being the trickster. He also got the name Māui-fusi-fonua (Māui land puller) when he begged for the magic fishhook from the old fisherman Tongafusifonua, who lived in Manuka (located to the east on the island of Tonga). Tongafusifonua allowed him to take the fishhook, under the condition that he could find it in his collection of countless hooks. But his wife, Tavatava, betrayed the secret, allowing Māui to pick the right hook. And so he was able to fish up the coral islands from the bottom of the ocean (volcanic islands are supposed to have fallen from the heavens).

== Tahitian mythology ==
In the mythology of Tahiti, Māui was a wise man, or prophet. He was a priest, but was afterwards deified. Being at one time engaged at the marae (sacred place), and the sun getting low while Māui's work was unfinished, he laid hold of the hihi, or sun-rays, and stopped his course for some time. As the discoverer of fire, Māui was named Ao-ao-ma-ra'i-a because he taught the art of obtaining fire by friction of wood. Before this time people ate their food raw. See also Mahui'e, Tahitian guardian of fire.

Māui was responsible for earthquakes.

== Samoan mythology ==
In Samoan mythology, Māui or Tiʻitiʻi gave fire to his people. Being the curious and kolohe demigod that he is, Tiʻitiʻi concealed himself closely to a wall that allowed his father, Talaga, to get to work in the underworld. The underworld is home to Mafuiʻe, the earthquake god. When Tiʻitiʻi got the chance, he went up to the wall and imitated the voice of his father, saying "O rock! Divide, I am Talaga, I come to work on my land given by Mafuiʻe". As Tiʻitiʻi passed through to the underworld, his father was surprised and told his son to help quietly so he doesn't anger Mafui‘e. While working, Tiʻitiʻi noticed smoke and asked his father where it was coming from. Talaga explained that the smoke was from Mafuiʻes fire. Tiʻitiʻi went to see the god and ask for fire. Mafuiʻe gave him a little bit of the fire; then he quickly built a stone oven, or umu, to put it in. His idea was to cook the taro that they had been harvesting. The god came and blew the fire up scattering the rocks and angered Tiʻitiʻi. As he goes to talk to the god, Mafui‘e was determined to punish Tiʻitiʻi severely for daring to rebel against the power of fire. Their great duel ultimately ended with Tiʻitiʻi triumphant. The young demigod broke off Mafuiʻe's right arm and caught the left arm right after. Scared that Tiʻitiʻi was going to break off that arm, Mafuiʻe pleaded with him to spare the left arm so he could still fulfill his duty of keeping Samoa flat with earthquakes. The god offered him one hundred wives should he spare his left arm. The hero declined; the god offered the secrets of fire that he can take to the upper world. Tiʻitiʻi accepted this offer and learned that the gods had hidden eternal fire in trees, to be extracted by rubbing sticks from the trees together.

== Mangarevan mythology ==
In the mythology of Mangareva, Māui hauls the land up from the sea, and ties the sun with tresses of hair. His father was Ataraga and his mother was Uaega.

There were eight Māui: Māui-mua, Māui-muri, Māui-toere-mataroa, Tumei-hauhia, Māui-tikitiki-toga, Māui-matavaru, Māui-taha, Māui-roto. Māui the eight-eyed (matavaru) is the hero. He is born from his mother's navel, and is raised by his grandfather, Te Rupe, who gives him a magic staff named Atua-tane and a hatchet named Iraiapatapata.

== In popular culture ==
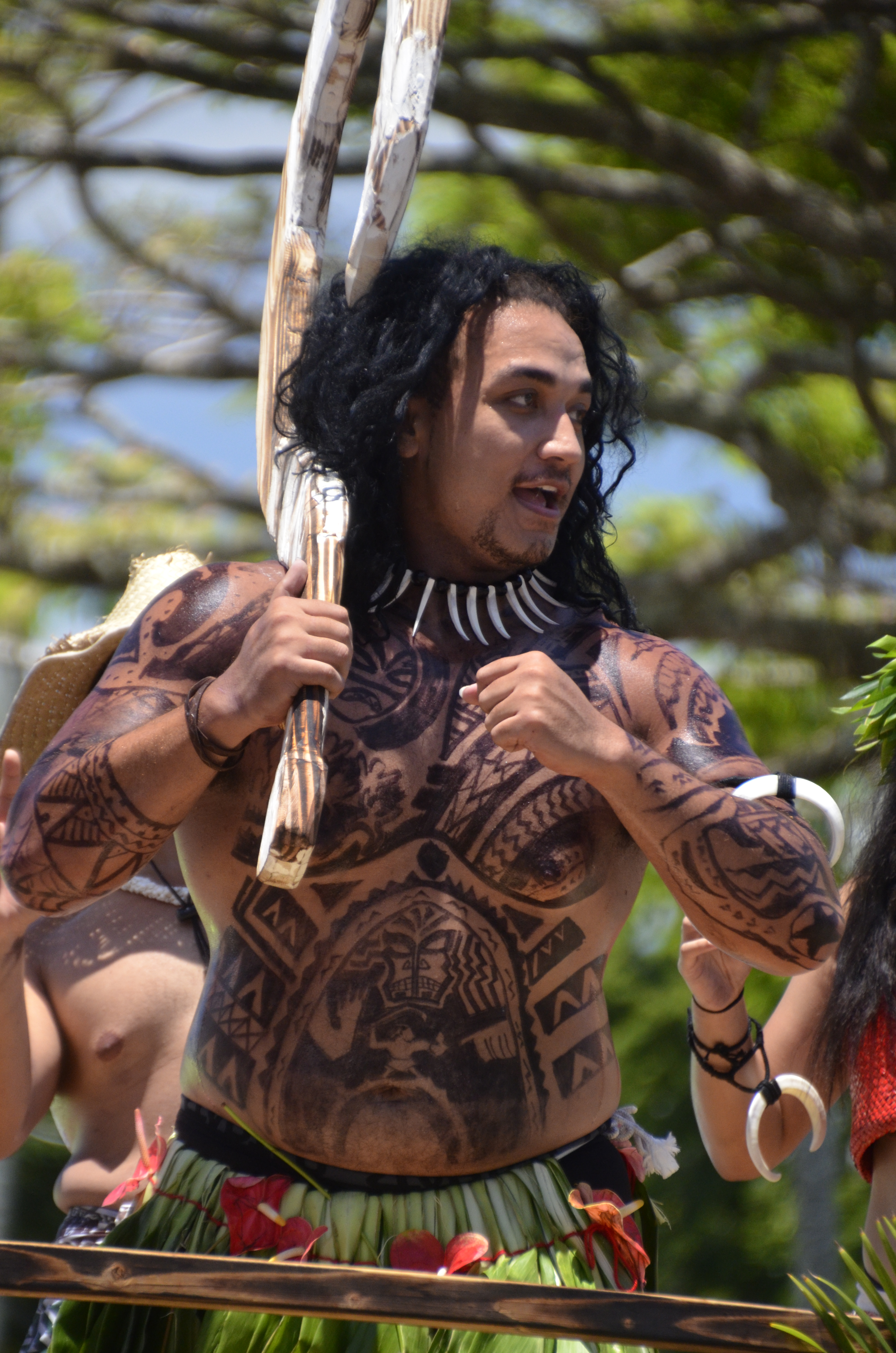
Participant of the Merrie Monarch Parade in Hilo performs as Māui, based largely on his depiction in the 2016 film Moana

Maui appears in the 2016 Disney 3D computer-animated musical film Moana and its 2024 sequel Moana 2, in which he is voiced by Dwayne Johnson, who also portrayed the character in the 2026 live-action remake of the first film. Abandoned by his human parents as a baby, the gods took pity on him and made him a demigod and gave him a magic fish hook that gives him the ability to shape-shift. He went on to perform miracles to win back the love of humanity, each of which earned him an animated tattoo. He is fabled to have stolen the heart of Te Fiti, a powerful island goddess who creates life. The protagonist of the film, Moana, persuades him to help her return it. In his song "You're Welcome", composed by Lin-Manuel Miranda, Maui mentions and takes credit for several of the deeds he is credited with in folklore. This version of Māui incorporates elements from various Polynesian narratives.

== See also ==
- Hoderi, another mythological figure armed with a magical fish hook
- Warohunugamwanehaora
- Pandora's Box (1999 video game)
