= Pulotu =

Polynesian underworld

Pulotu is the resting place of those passed on in the Polynesian narrative of Tonga and Samoa, the world of darkness "lalo fonua" (as opposed to the human world of light).

== Name ==
The term is related to Fijian Burotu. It goes back to Proto-Polynesian *pulotu, from Proto-Central Pacific *burotu.

== Tonga ==
In the Tongan narrative, Pulotu is presided over by Havea Hikuleʻo. In Tongan cosmology the sky, the sea, and Pulotu existed from the beginning, and the gods lived there. The first land they made for the people was Touiaʻifutuna "trapped in Futuna", which was only a rock. There are suggestions that for Tonga and Samoa, Pulotu refers to a real country, in fact Matuku Island in the Lau Islands. The old name of Matuku Island is Burotu. However, there is no signs of underwater civilization in the Matuku waters where they said that Burotu once laid. But new evidence suggest Pulotu is situated in Moturiki belonging to Fiji’s Lomaiviti Archipelago.

After the independence struggle by Hikuleʻo and his cousins Maui Motuʻa and Tangaloa ʻEiki, they renamed Touiaʻifutuna into Tongamamaʻo. Only after that the other islands were made (the volcanic islands by Hikuleʻo and the coral islands by Maui). Finally, Tongamamaʻo was renamed, for the last time, as Tonga.

Hikuleʻo is supposed to have married a daughter of Tangaloa ʻEiki.

== Samoa ==
In the mythology of Samoa, Pulotu is presided over by the god Saveasi'uleo (also referred to as Elo), whose name reveals a similarity to the Tongan god Havea Hikuleʻo. Saveasi'uleo is the father of Nafanua the Goddess of War in Samoa, from the village of Falealupo, the site of the entryway into Pulotu.

Spirits enter Pulotu at Le Fafa at Falealupo village.

== See also ==
- In Melanesia, a similar concept is part of Fijian mythology – see Burotu.
- The Māori goddess of death Hine-nui-te-pō who guards the entrance to the underworld te reinga wairua.
