= Tiʻitiʻi =

Figure in Samoan mythology

In Samoan legend, the mythological figure Tiʻitiʻi Atalaga appears in legends very similar to those recounting the tales of the demigod Māui, found in other island cultures. In one such legend, which is almost identical to the New Zealand fire myth of Māui Tikitiki-a-Taranga, he succeeds in bringing fire to the people of Samoa after a battle with the earthquake god, Mafuiʻe. During the battle, Ti'iti'i breaks off one of Mafui'e's arms, forcing him to agree to teach him of how fire had been concealed by the gods in certain trees during the making of the world. The people of Samoa were thankful to Ti'iti'i for breaking off Mafui'e's arm, as they believed that he was less able to create large earthquakes as a result.

In Polynesian spellings, 't' and 'k' are linguistically linked, and in speech, the 'k' sound is typically used in place of the 't' sound. Likewise, the apostrophe can be used to replace either sounds. Thus, the Samoan Ti'iti'i is comparable to the Gilbert Islands' Tiki-tiki, or Hawai'ian Maui-ki'i-ki'i.

== See also ==
- Māui (Hawaiian mythology)
- Māui (Mangarevan mythology)
- Māui (Māori mythology)
- Māui (Tahitian mythology)
- Māui (Tongan mythology)
