= Falealupo =

- Village & Electoral Constituency
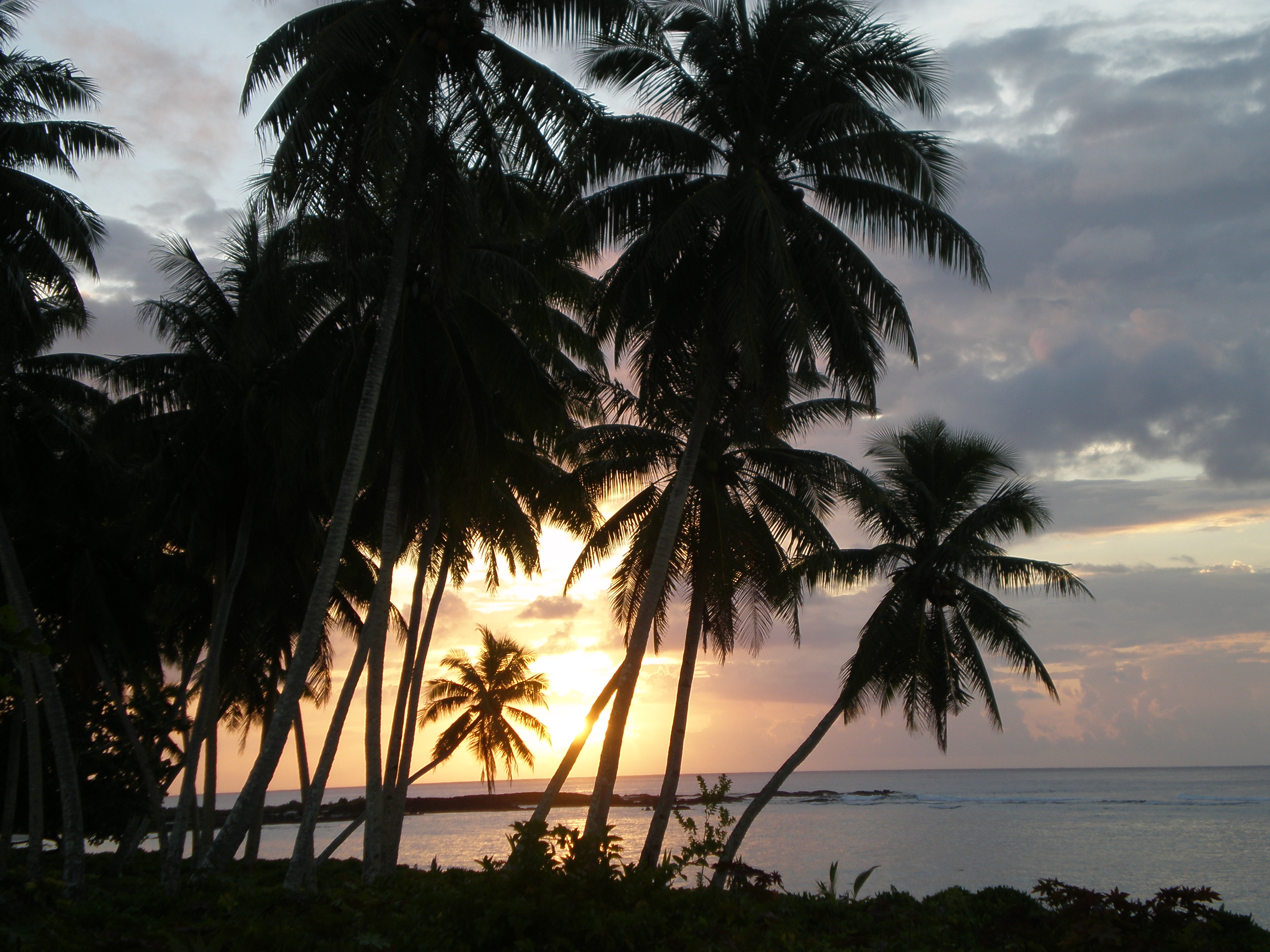
- Falealupo sunset

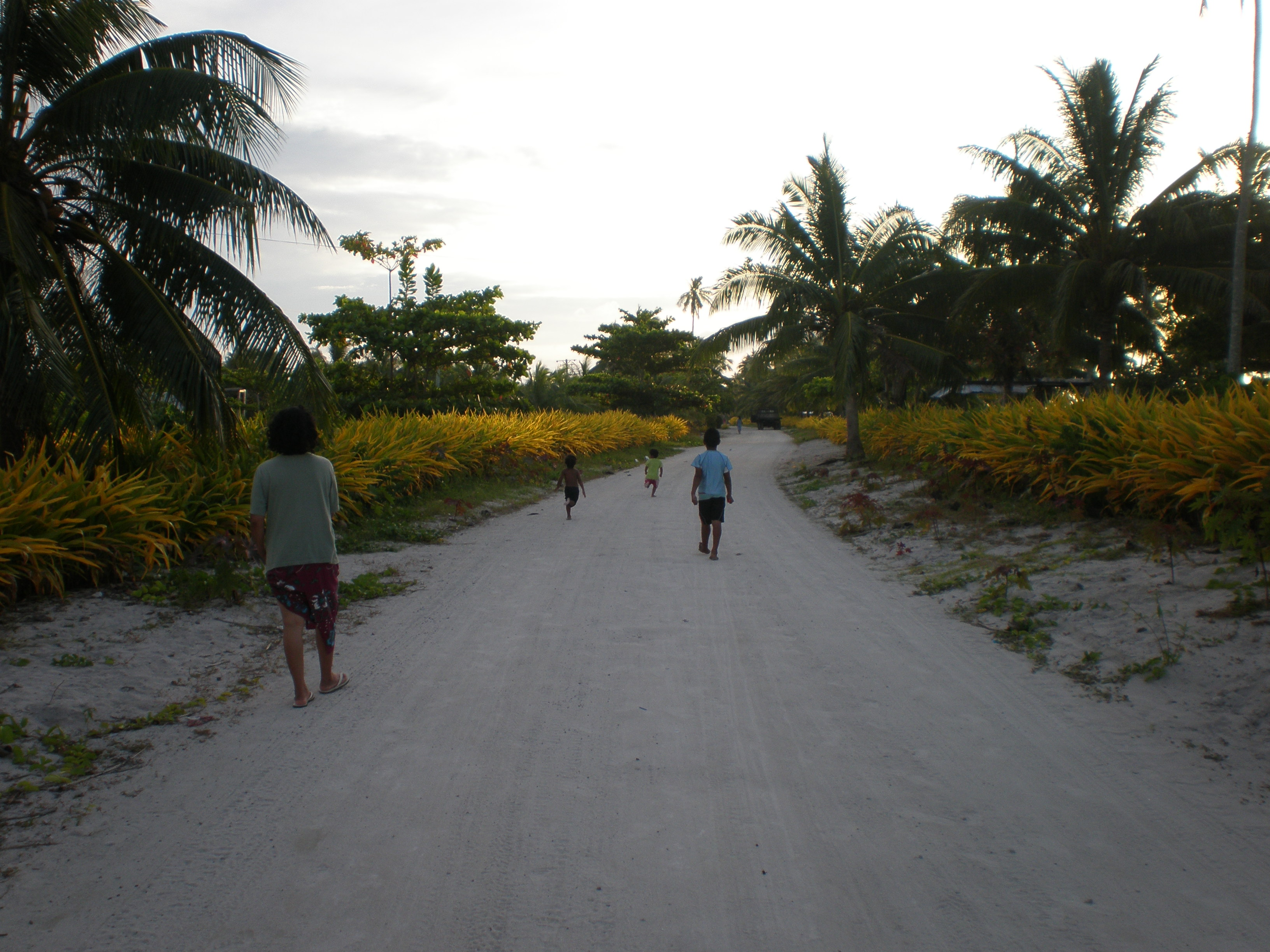
- Main road in the afternoon, Falealupo Tai

- Coordinates: 13°30′9″S 172°47′23″W
- Country: Samoa
- District: Vaisigano

Population (2016)
  - Total: 545
- Time zone: +13
- Falealupo-uta (inland) & Falealupo-tai (coast)

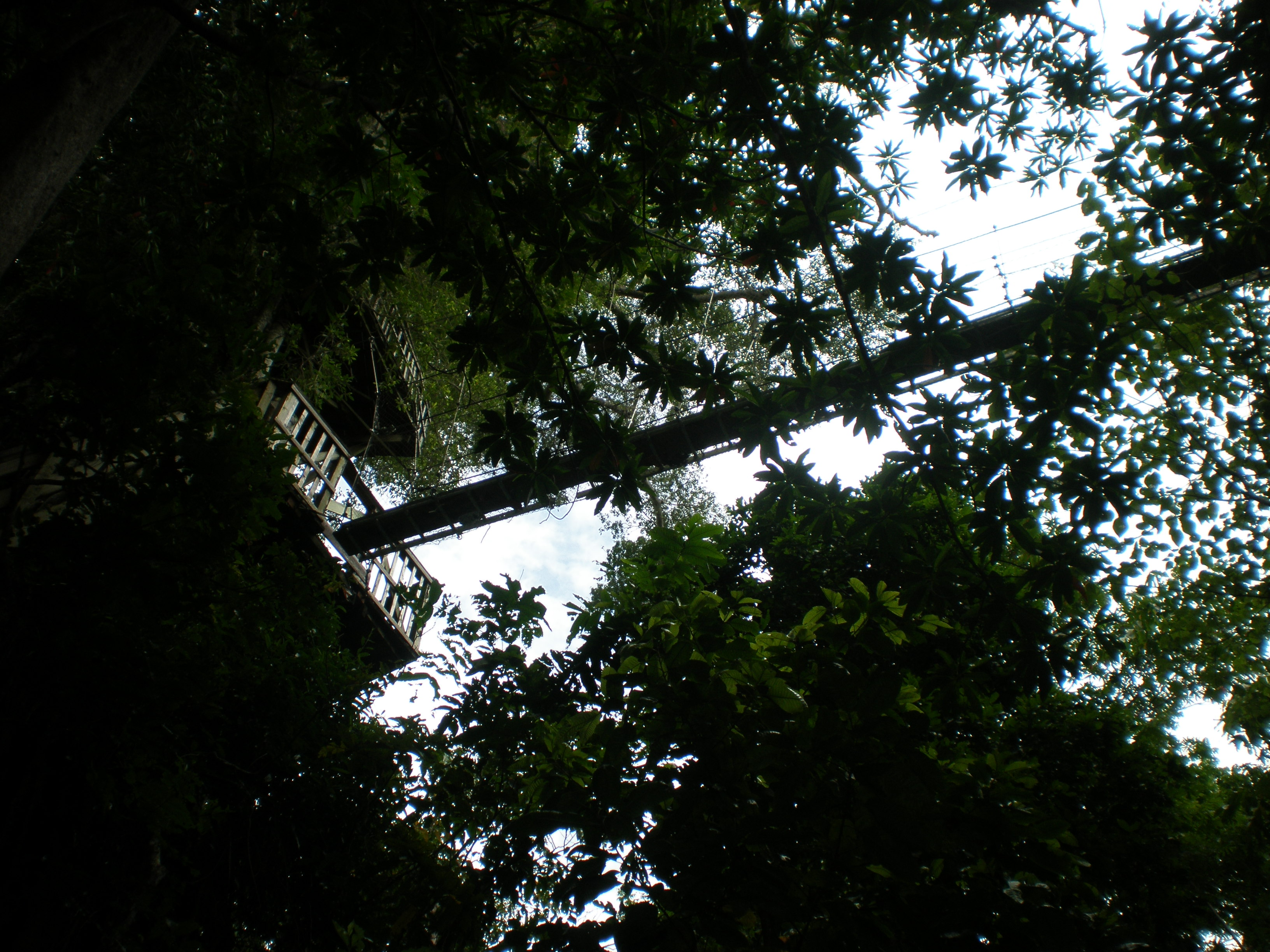
View of Falealupo rainforest canopy walkway and old wooden tower.

Falealupo is a village in Samoa situated at the west end of Savai'i island 20 miles (32 km) from the International Date Line used until 29 December 2011. The village has two main settlements, Falealupo-Uta, situated inland by the main island highway and Falealupo-Tai, situated by the sea. The road to the coastal settlement is about 9 km, most of it unsealed, from the main highway. The village's population is 545.

Due to its location in the west of the country, and because Samoa was just to the east of the International Date Line, Falealupo has been described as "the last village in the world to see the sunset of each day". This has now changed, as the Samoan government has moved the International Date Line east of the country in 2011.

Families have moved inland for the convenience of living by the main road near public transport, as well as the extensive damage to the coastal village from cyclones in the early 1990s, which left behind old church ruins along the coast. There are rock pools, caves, and sandy beaches in the area. Falealupo-Uta has small shops and facilities for Western Union money transfer while there are beach fale accommodation and a shop at Falealupo-tai.

The settlement is part of Falealupo Electoral Constituency (Faipule District) which forms part of the larger political district of Vaisigano.

Roman Catholic Cardinal Pio Taofinu'u (1923–2006), the first Polynesian bishop and cardinal, was born in Falealupo and attended the village school.

== Myths and Legends ==
In Samoa, the village of Falealupo on the western side of Savaiʻi served as the home of Nafanua. Often chiefs from distant villages and islands would come to Falealupo to seek Nafanua's blessings before beginning any military adventure. In 1989, the Chiefs and Orators of Falealupo bestowed the title of Nafanua on ethnobotanist Paul Alan Cox for his conservation efforts in protecting the Samoan rainforest.

In the sea at the farthest point of the peninsula, the Fafā-o-Sauali’i, an outcropping of volcanic rocks, is said in legend to be the gateway to the underworld Pulotu, where aitu, the spirits of deceased persons, reside.

== Falealupo Rainforest conservation ==
Falealupo land include large tracts of lowland rainforest. Most of Samoa's land is locally village owned under customary land governed by family matai, the chiefly heads of extended families. In 1990 the Samoan government gave the remote village of Falealupo an ultimatum to build a better school or teachers would be removed and their children would not be educated. Education in Samoa is a partnership between villages and the government, and with most of the land under customary ownership, villages provide land and school buildings with the government providing teachers and the curriculum. Most of the island's economy is based on subsistence living from plantations and fishing and with no other source of revenue, the villagers sold logging rights to their rainforests. Before the logging could take place, however, Seacology co-founder and chairman Paul Alan Cox, an American ethnobotanist who had lived with his family in the village, discovered that the pristine rainforests surrounding the village of Falealupo were to be logged. Cox worked with the village chiefs and promised to raise the funds for the school in exchange for a covenant protecting the 30,000-acre (120 km^{2}) rainforest.

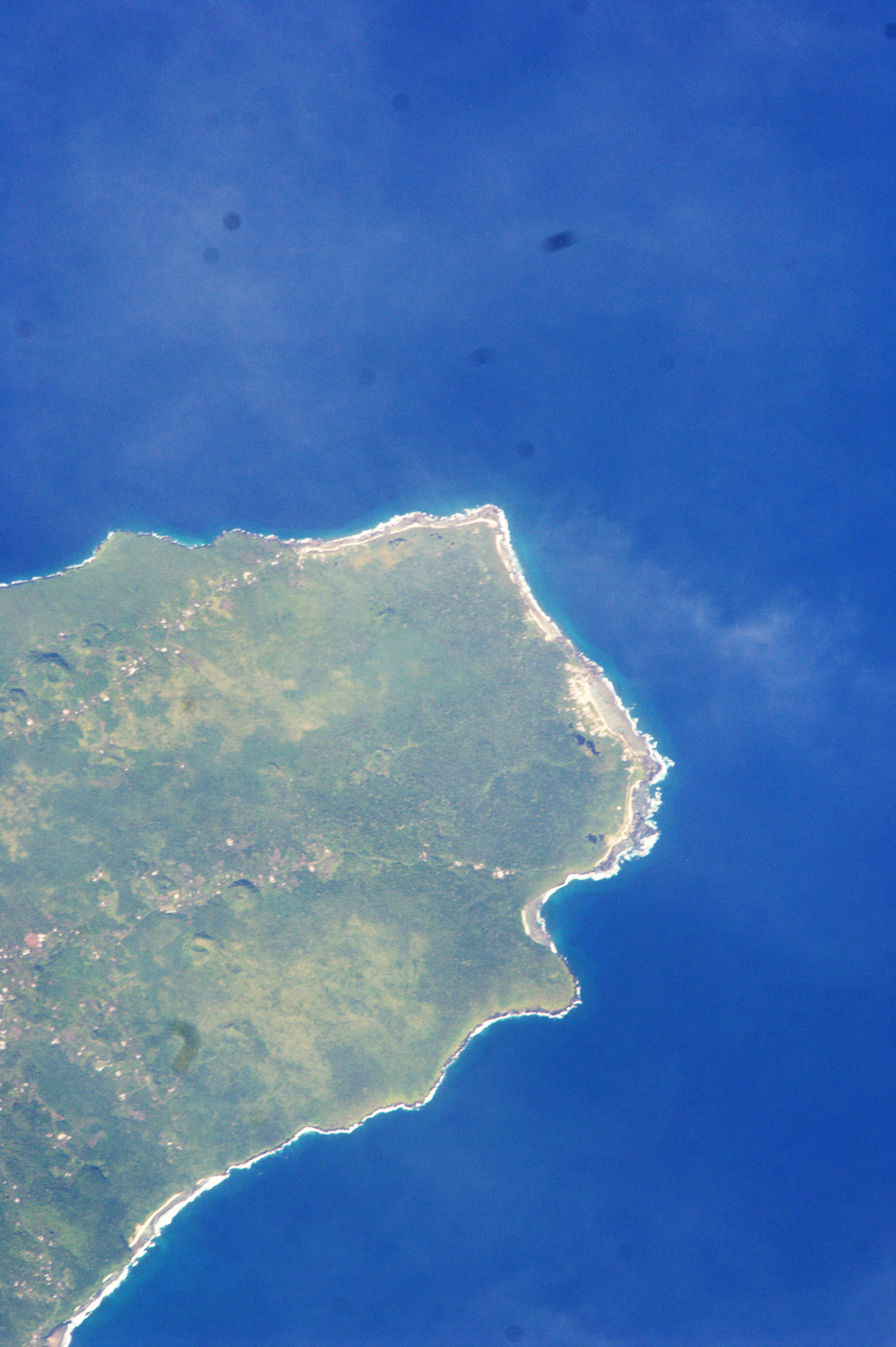
Satellite image of Falealupo at the west end of Savai'i island. (NASA photo 2009).

The Falealupo Rainforest School was constructed, and the village bestowed matai titles on Paul Cox, Ken Murdock, and Rex Maughan. In recognition of his achievement, in 1997 Cox together with the late High Chief Fuiono Senio shared the prestigious Goldman Environmental Prize. Cox donated his share of the prize to Seacology, which uses the funds to maintain the Falealupo Rainforest Canopy Aerial Walkway, dedicated in 1997. Seacology funded the walkway, which is owned and operated by the village, in order to help the community generate revenues from eco-tourism. At the ceremonial dedication, it was announced that the village would extend the 50-year covenant and promised to protect the rainforest in perpetuity.

In 1989, Cox was bestowed a matai chief title, Nafanua, by Falealupo in honour of his work. The title is registered with the Samoan Lands and Title Court.

In 1999, the village announced that beginning 1 January 2000 monthly tourist revenues from the aerial canopy walkway would be used to fund a modest retirement fund for village elders. In February 2008, the canopy walkway was closed due to rot in the 10m wooden tower leading up to the aerial rope walkway and platforms in a giant banyan tree. Seacology funded and constructed a new aluminium tower which was completed and opened on 10 June 2010.

Entry to the Falealupo rainforest walkway is about 2 km from the main road, on the way to the Falealupo Tai. A modest fee is charged by the village to visitors who wish to ascend the walkway.

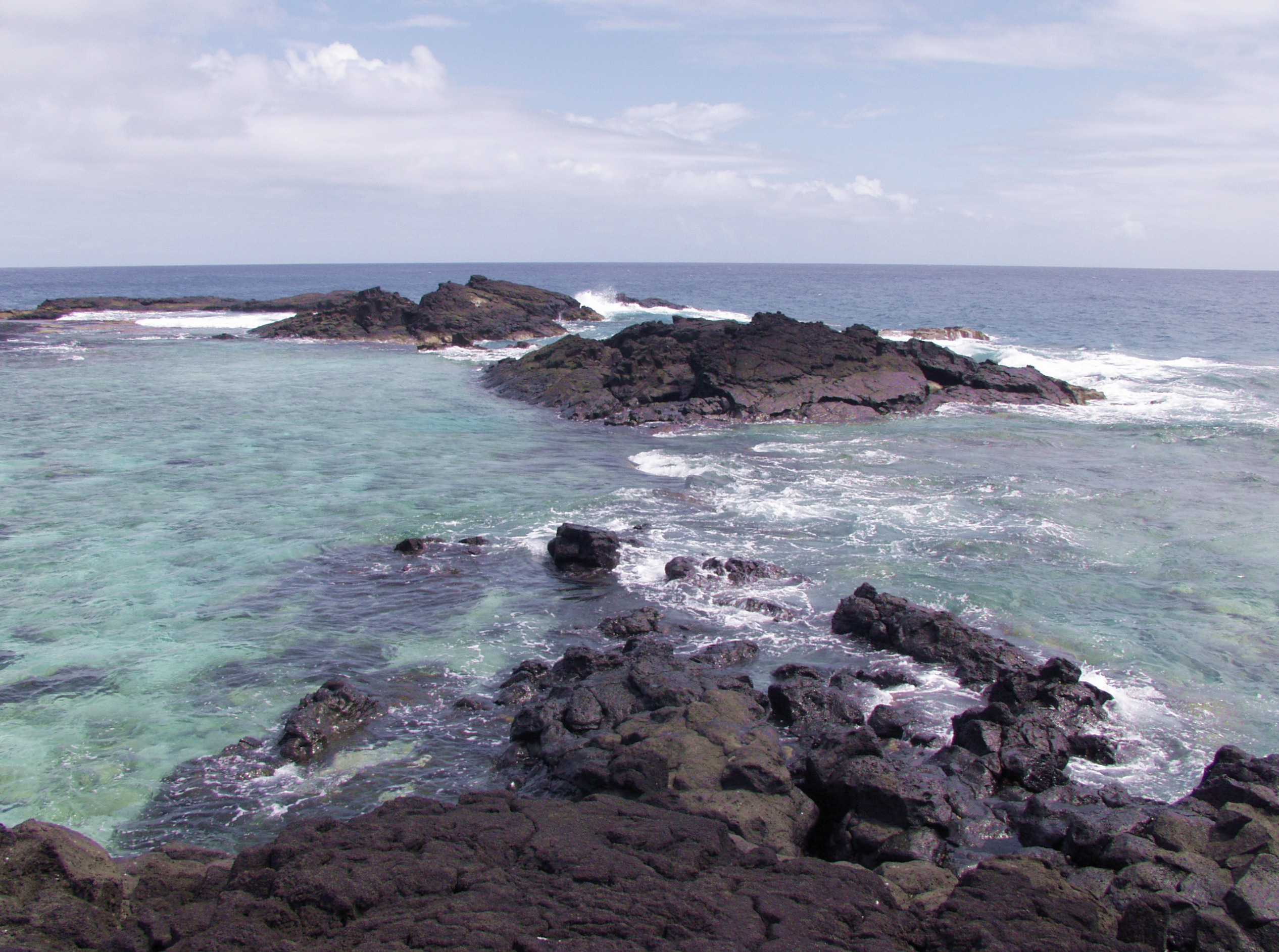
Looking west at the western tip of Savai'i

== Notable Samoans from Falealupo ==
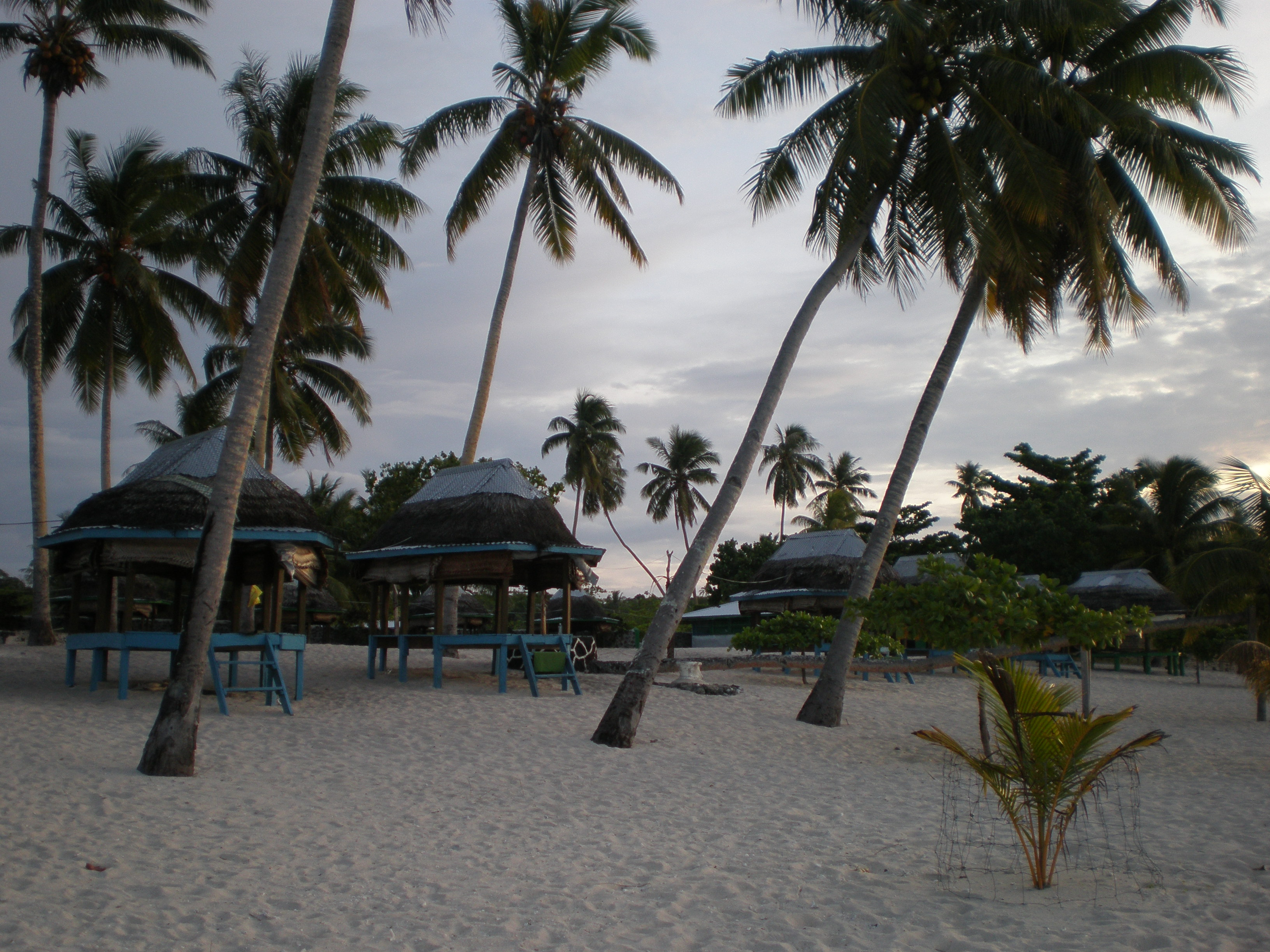
Falealupo beach fale, local owned tourist accommodation

Notable Samoans from Falealupo include;

- John Schuster, a former All Black (rugby union national team of New Zealand).
- Leo Lafaiali'i, a player for Manu Samoa (rugby union national team of Samoa) and a former Auckland Blues player.
- King Kapisi, a hip hop artist in New Zealand. The chief title of his family in Falealupo is A'eau. The grave of King Kapisi's great grandfather Aeau Fa'aloaga is behind the new church in Falealupo-tai. In 1999, King Kapisi filmed his music video Reverse Resistance at Falealupo as well as Fagamalo, Safotu and at the Taga blowholes in Savaii. The opening shot in the video starts at the old church ruin in Falealupo (now the new church) and the closing shot is a sunset at Falealupo beach with children from his family. The song became the first hip hop song to win the prestigious APRA Silver Scroll Award in New Zealand.
- Aleni Smith - Olympic judoka who competed in the 2012 Summer Olympics.
- Pio Taofinu'u - Archbishop of Somoa- Apia, First Somoan Cardinal.

== See also ==
- List of protected areas of Samoa
- Central Savai'i Rainforest, largest continuous patch of rainforest in Polynesia
- Samoan plant names, includes scientific names and many used in traditional medicine
- Prostratin
