= Culture of Oceania =

The culture of Oceania encompasses the collective and diverse customs and traditions of art, architecture, music, literature, lifestyle, philosophy, politics and religion that have been practiced and maintained by the many ethnic groups of the geographical region of Oceania since prehistory. Cultures of Oceania reflect not only that of the region's indigenous peoples, but also the cultures brought by European colonisation and the United States, particularly through mass culture such as cinema and TV. Oceania is commonly divided into four geographic sub-regions, characterized by shared cultural, religious, linguistic, and ethnic traits: Australasia, Melanesia, Micronesia, and Polynesia. Most Oceanian countries are multi-party representative parliamentary democracies, and tourism is a large source of income for the Pacific Islands nations.

== Overview ==
The cultural spheres are not mutually disjoint and can even overlap, representing the innate diversity and syncretism of human cultures and historical influences.

=== Australasia ===
==== Australia ====
Australia is home to a diversity of cultures, a result of its history of immigration. Since 1788, Australian culture has primarily been a Western culture strongly influenced by early Anglo-Celtic settlers. Other influences include Australian Aboriginal culture, the traditions brought to the country by waves of immigration from around the world, and the culture of the United States. The cultural divergence and evolution that has occurred over the centuries since European settlement has resulted in a distinctive Australian culture.

==== New Zealand ====
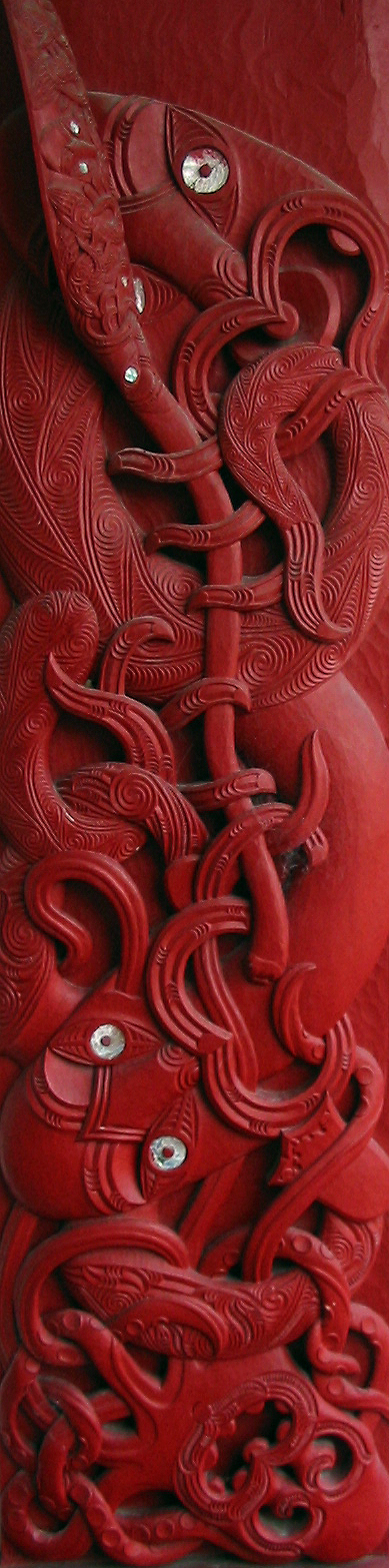
Late 20th-century house-post depicting the navigator Kupe fighting two sea creatures

Early Māori adapted the tropically based east Polynesian culture in line with the challenges associated with a larger and more diverse environment, eventually developing their own distinctive culture. Social organisation was largely communal with families (whānau), subtribes (hapū) and tribes (iwi) ruled by a chief (rangatira), whose position was subject to the community's approval. The British and Irish immigrants brought aspects of their own culture to New Zealand and also influenced Māori culture, particularly with the introduction of Christianity. However, Māori still regard their allegiance to tribal groups as a vital part of their identity, and Māori kinship roles resemble those of other Polynesian peoples. More recently, American, Australian, Asian and other European cultures have exerted influence on New Zealand. Non-Māori Polynesian cultures are also apparent, with Pasifika, the world's largest Polynesian festival, now an annual event in Auckland.

The largely rural life in early New Zealand led to the image of New Zealanders being rugged, industrious problem solvers. Modesty was expected and enforced through the "tall poppy syndrome", where high achievers received harsh criticism. At the time, New Zealand was not known as an intellectual country. From the early 20th century until the late 1960s, Māori culture was suppressed by the attempted assimilation of Māori into British New Zealanders. In the 1960s, as tertiary education became more available, and cities expanded urban culture began to dominate. However, rural imagery and themes are common in New Zealand's art, literature and media.

New Zealand's national symbols are influenced by natural, historical, and Māori sources. The silver fern is an emblem appearing on army insignia and sporting team uniforms. Certain items of popular culture thought to be unique to New Zealand are called "Kiwiana".

=== Melanesia ===
==== Fiji ====
While indigenous Fijian culture and traditions are very vibrant and are integral components of everyday life for the majority of Fiji's population, Fijian society has evolved over the past century with the introduction of traditions such as Indian and Chinese as well as significant influences from Europe and Fiji's Pacific neighbours, particularly Tonga and Samoa. Thus, the various cultures of Fiji have come together to create a unique multicultural national identity.

Fiji's culture was showcased at the World Exposition held in Vancouver, Canada, in 1986 and more recently at the Shanghai World Expo 2010, along with other Pacific countries in the Pacific Pavilion.

==== Vanuatu ====
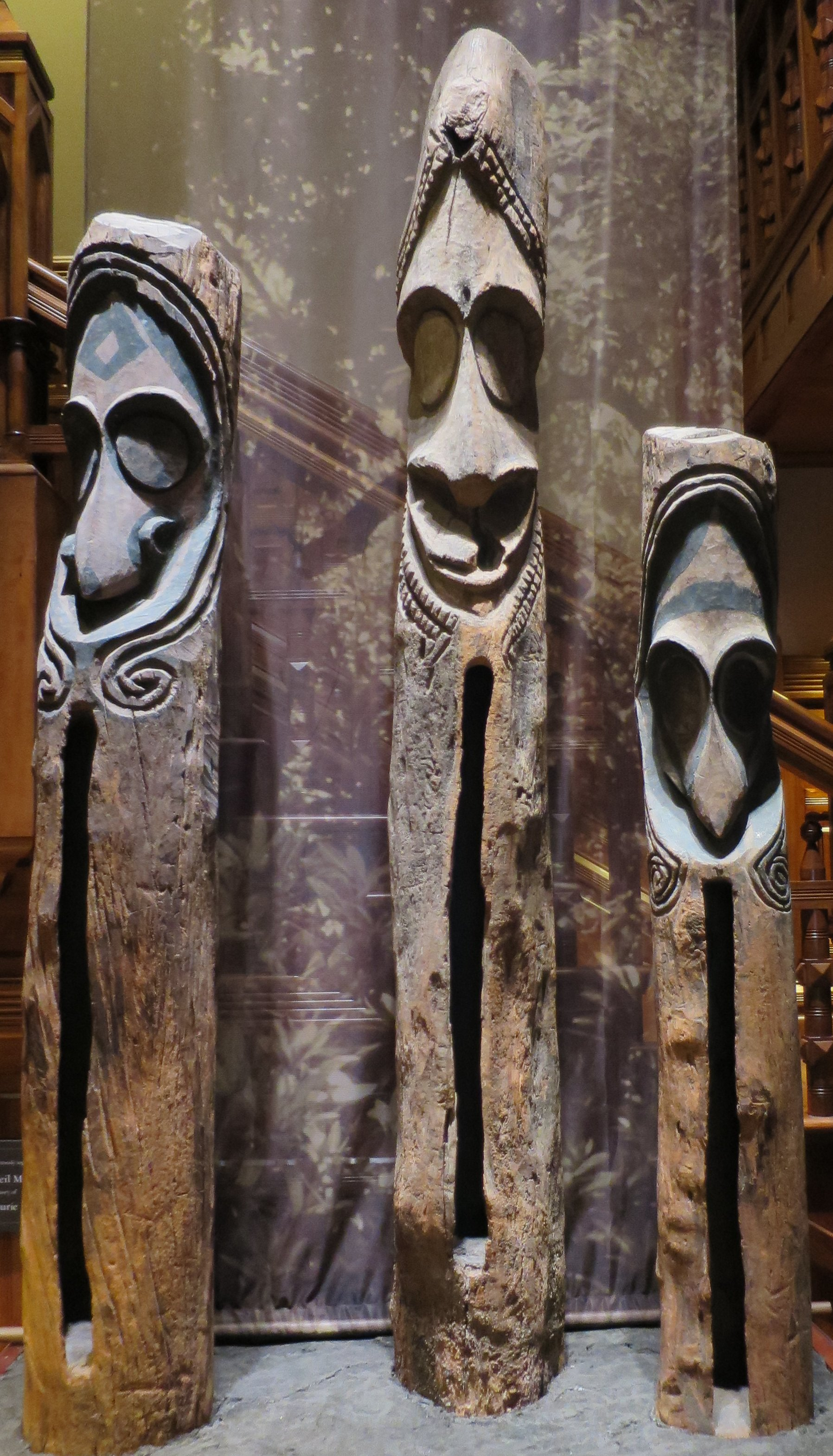
Wooden slit drums from Vanuatu.

Vanuatu culture retains a strong diversity through local regional variations and through foreign influence. Vanuatu may be divided into three major cultural regions. In the north, wealth is established by how much one can give away, through a grade-taking system. Pigs, particularly those with rounded tusks, are considered a symbol of wealth throughout Vanuatu. In the centre, more traditional Melanesian cultural systems dominate. In the south, a system involving grants of title with associated privileges has developed.

Young men undergo various coming-of-age ceremonies and rituals to initiate them into manhood, usually including circumcision.

Most villages have a nakamal or village clubhouse, which serves as a meeting point for men and a place to drink kava. Villages also have male- and female-only sections. These sections are situated all over the villages; in nakamals, special spaces are provided for females when they are in their menstruation period.

==== Solomon Islands ====
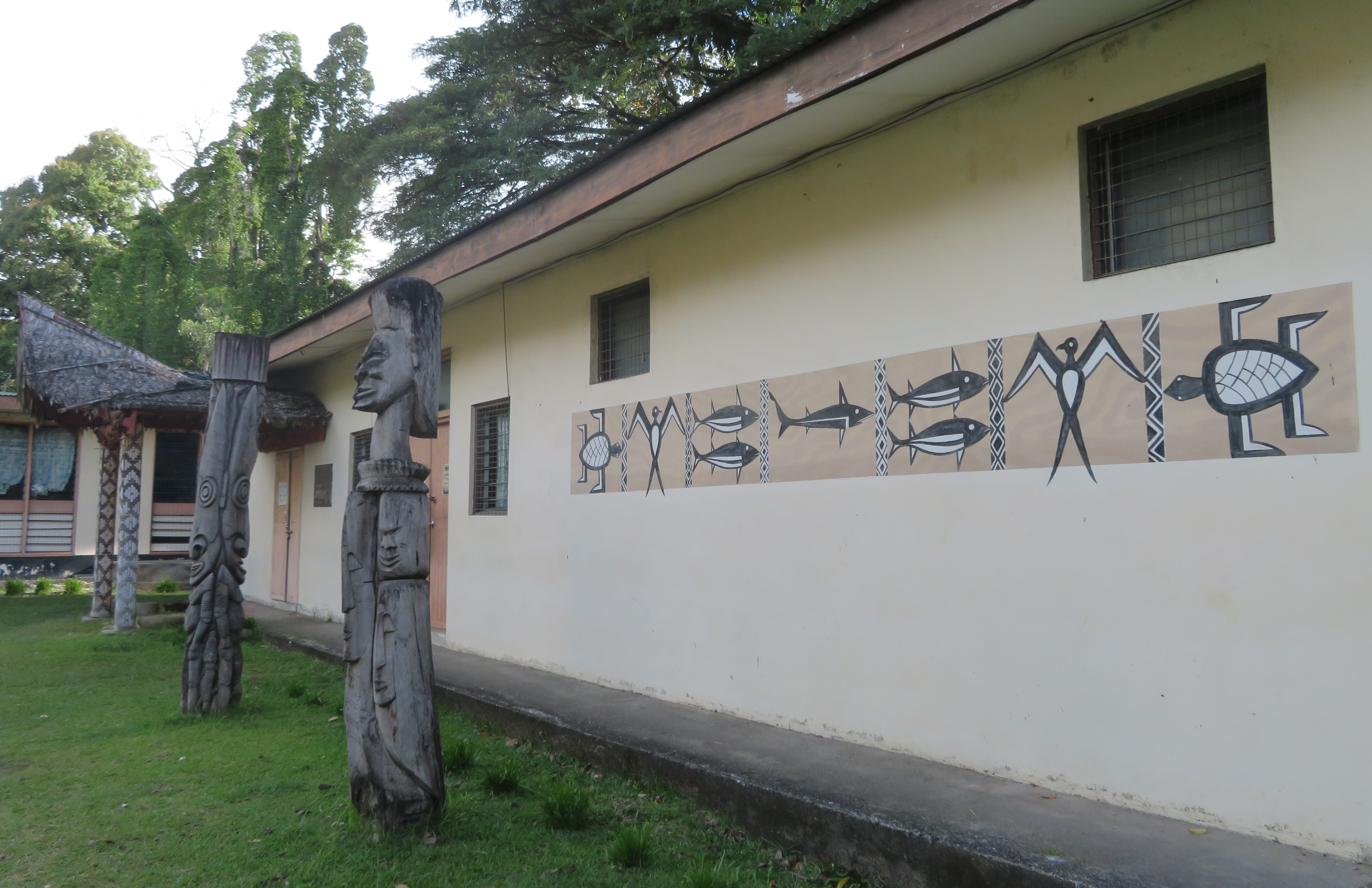
Traditional painting and wood carving in the National Museum in Honiara

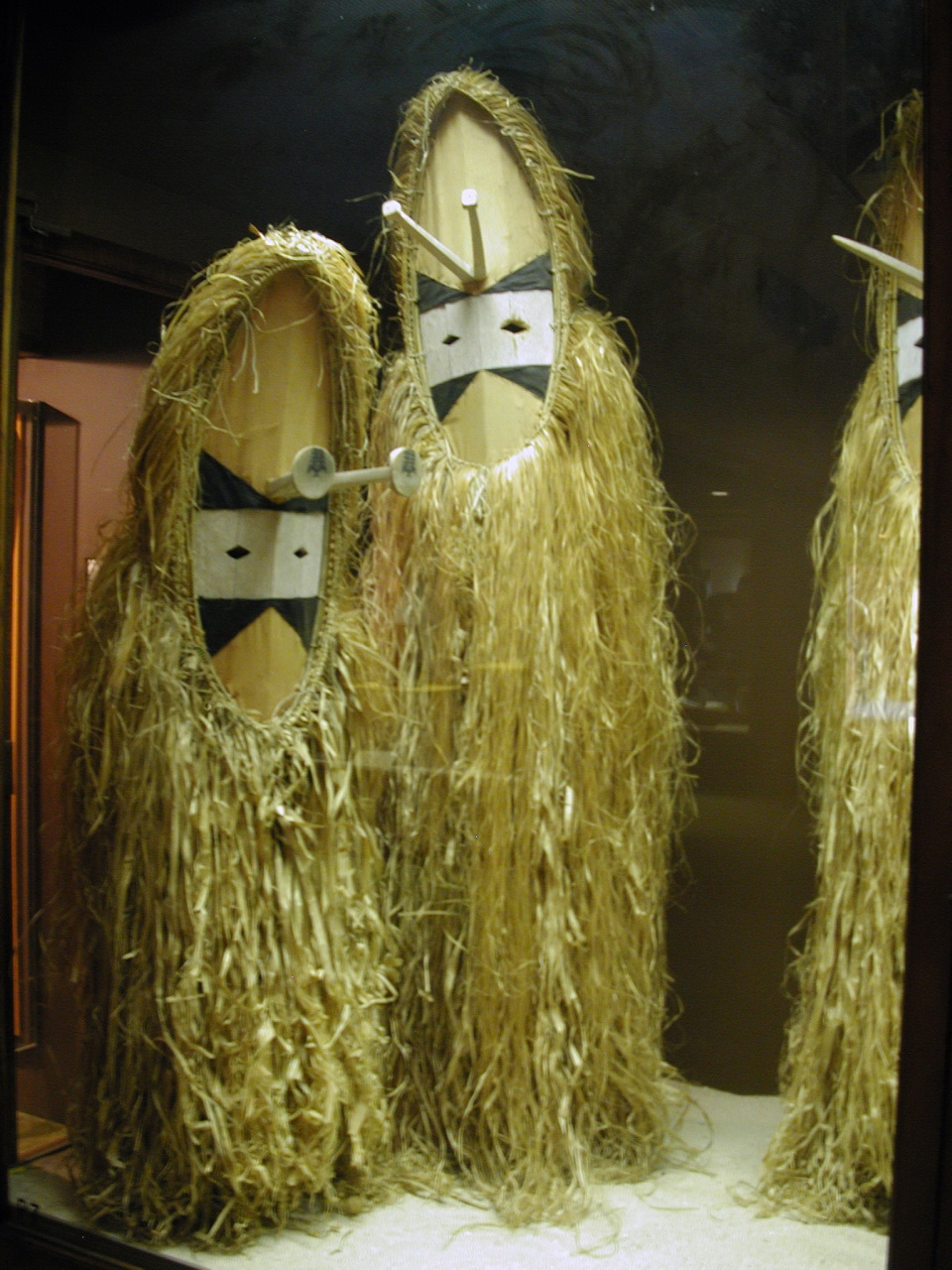
A traditional dance costume from Vanikoro (Solomon Islands).

The culture of Solomon Islands reflects the extent of the differentiation and diversity among the groups living within the Solomon Islands archipelago, which lies within Melanesia in the Pacific Ocean, with the peoples distinguished by island, language, topography, and geography. The cultural area includes the nation state of Solomon Islands and the Bougainville Island, which is a part of Papua New Guinea. Solomon Islands includes some culturally Polynesian societies which lie outside the main region of Polynesian influence, known as the Polynesian Triangle. There are seven Polynesian outliers within the Solomon Islands: Anuta, Bellona, Ontong Java, Rennell, Sikaiana, Tikopia, and Vaeakau-Taumako. Solomon Islands arts and crafts cover a wide range of woven objects, carved wood, stone and shell artefacts in styles specific to different provinces. :

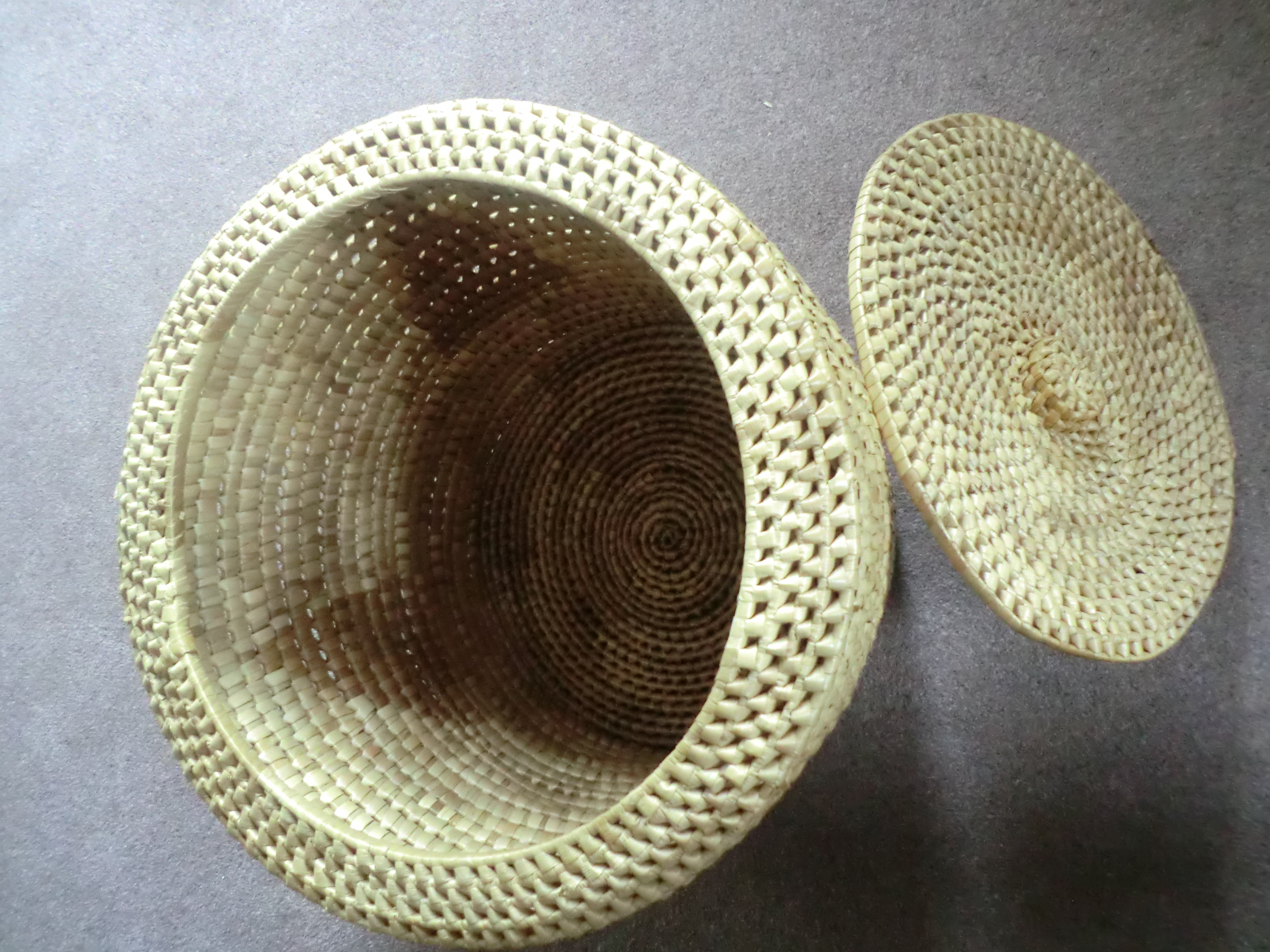
Laundry basket

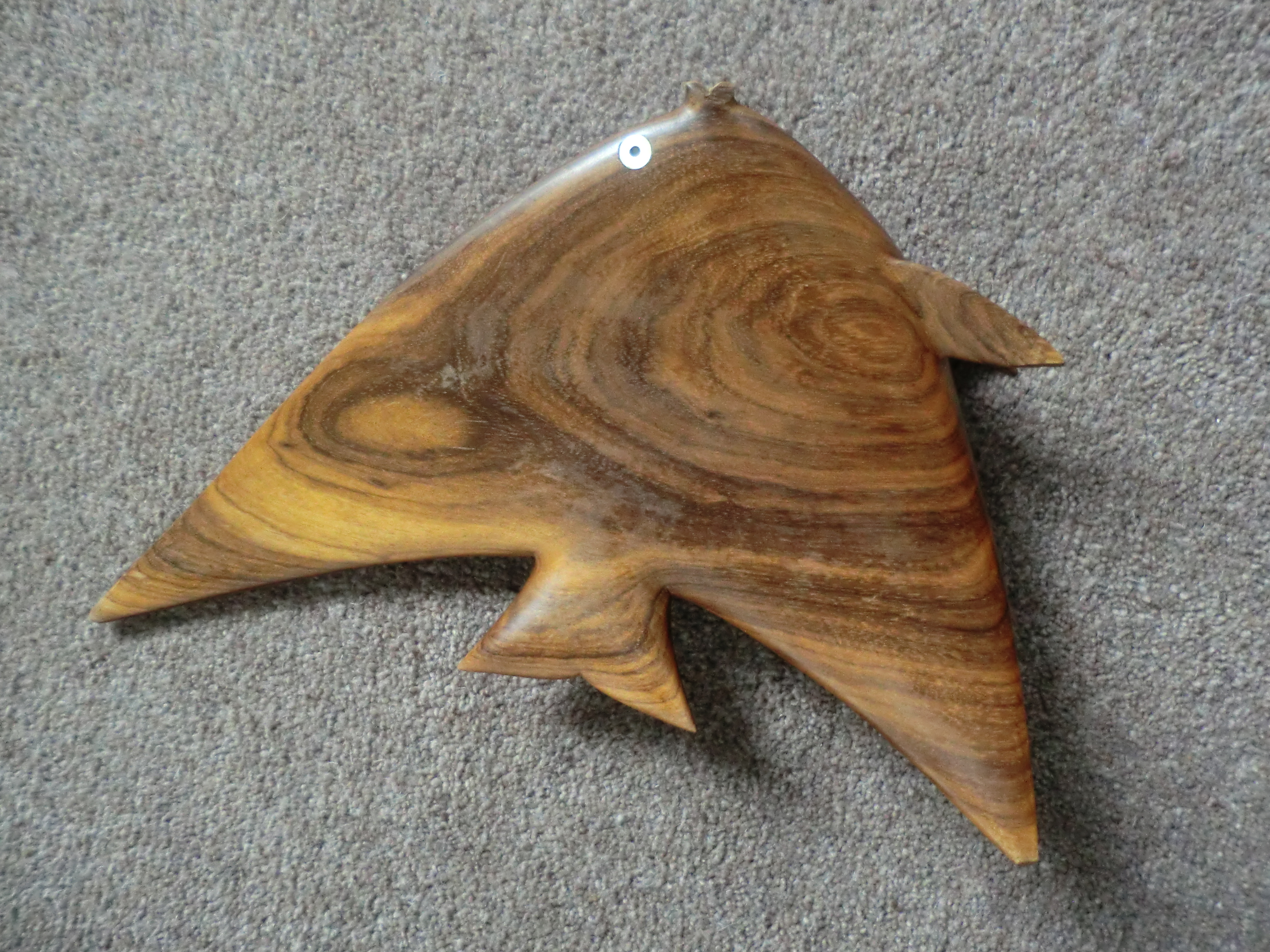
Carved fish

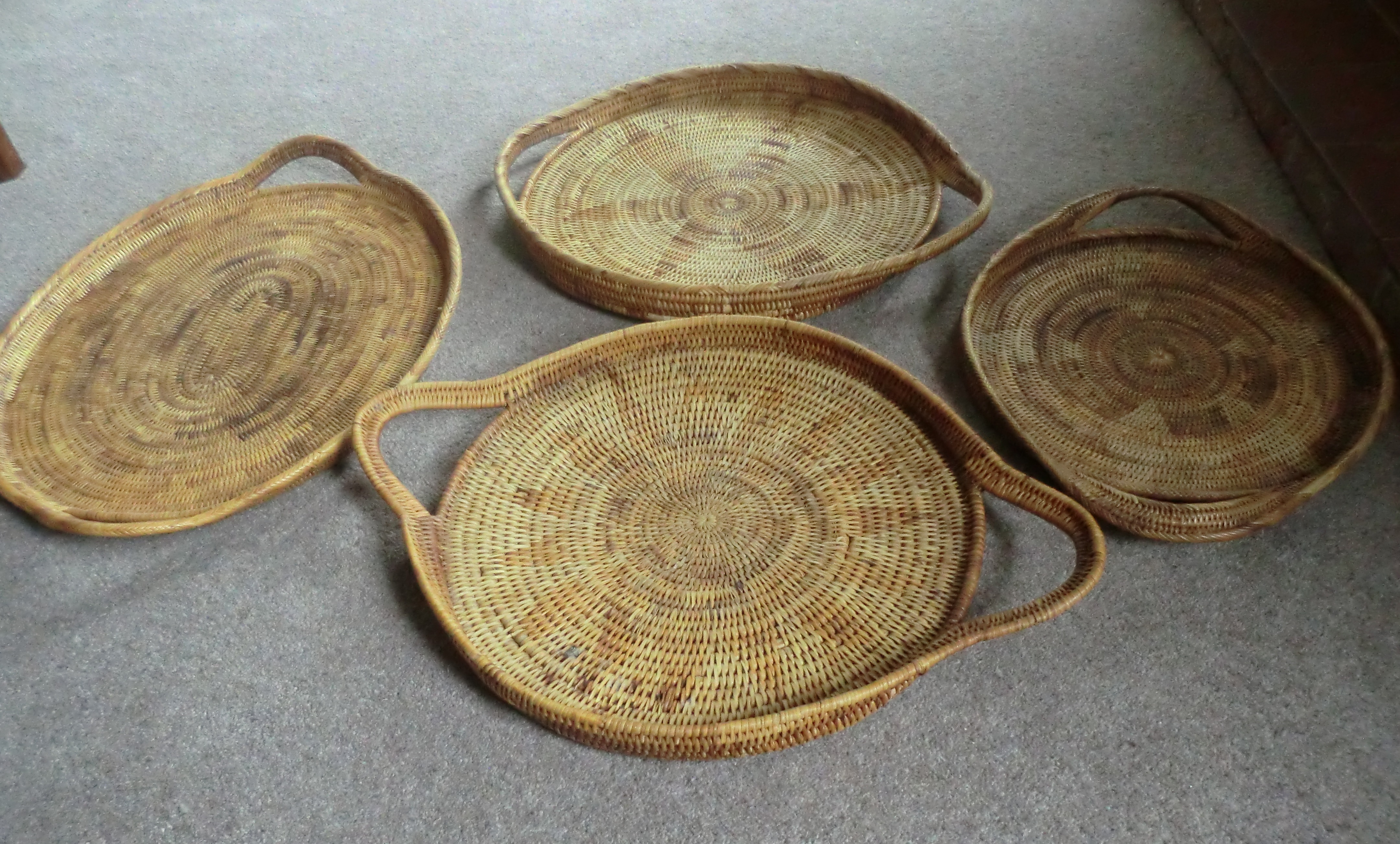
Bukhaware trays

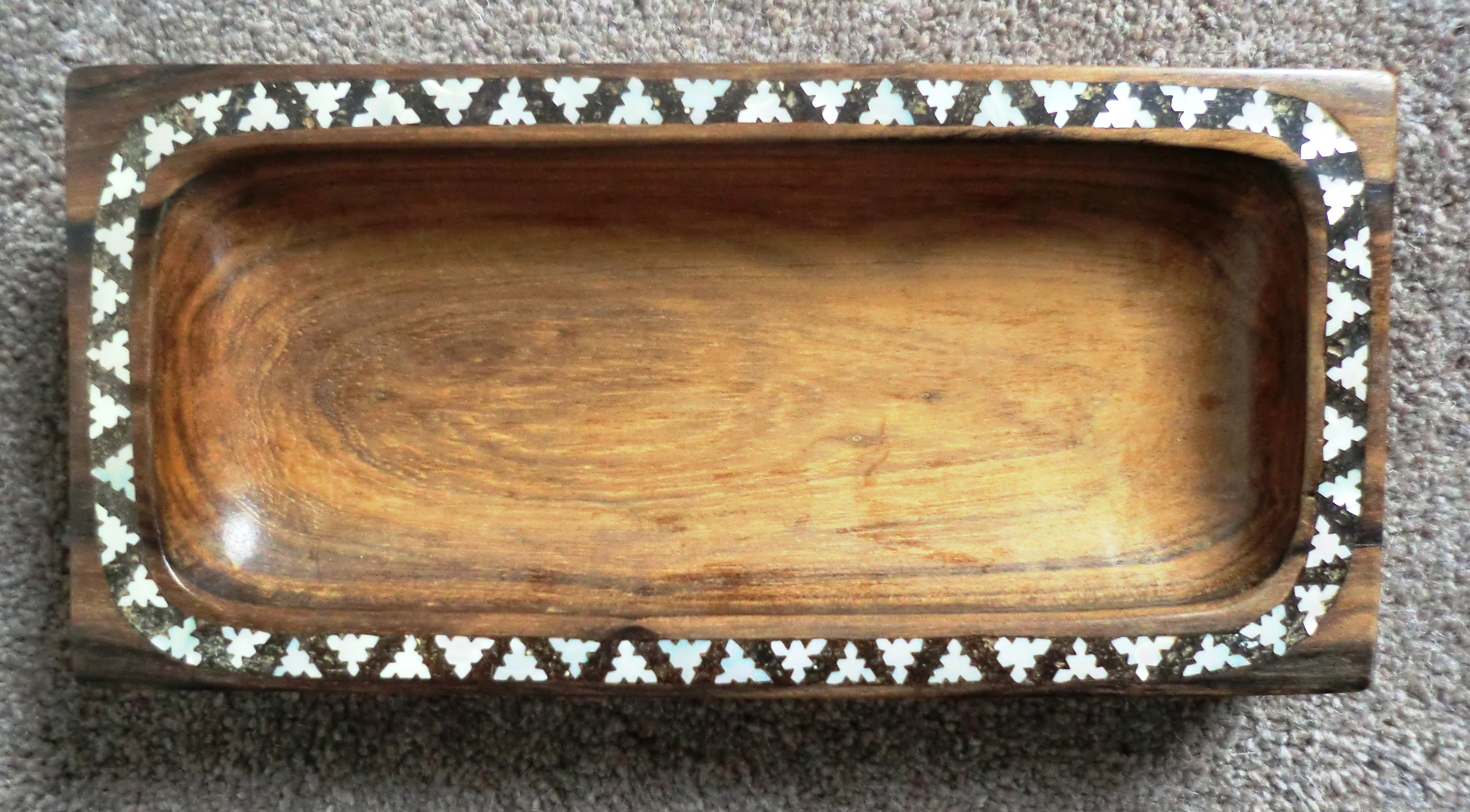
Carved dish inlaid with mother-of-pearl

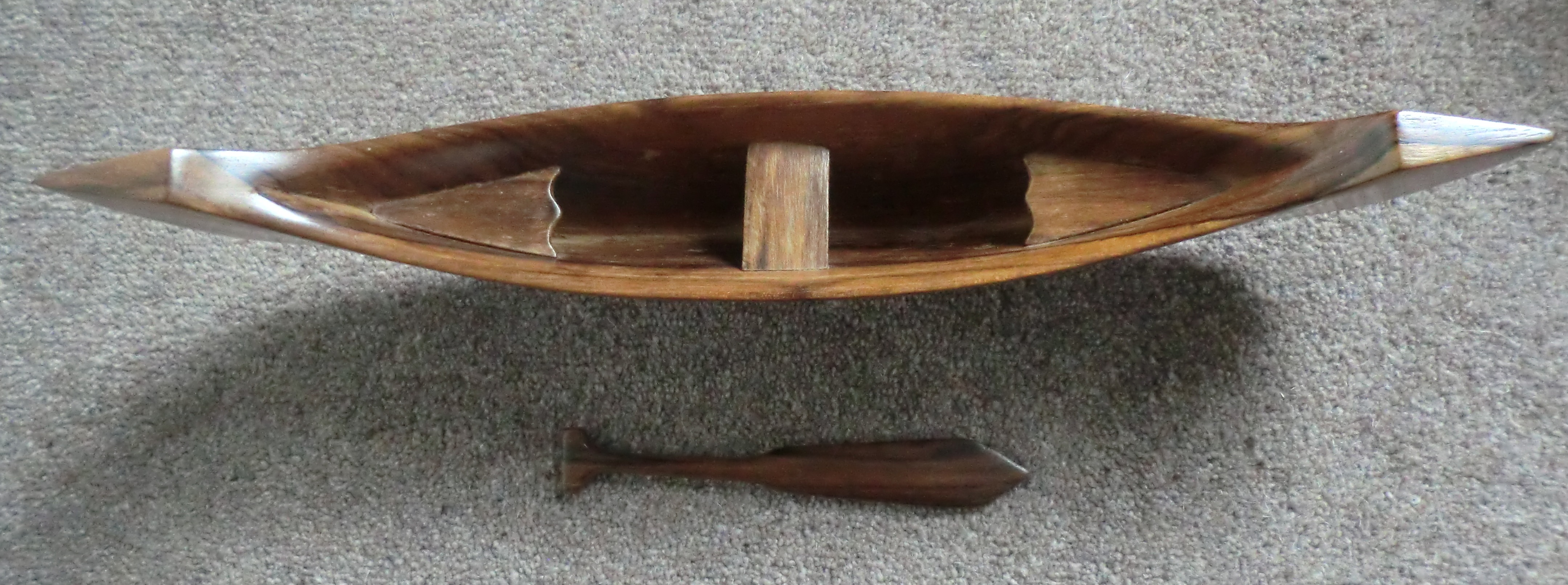
Carved longboat

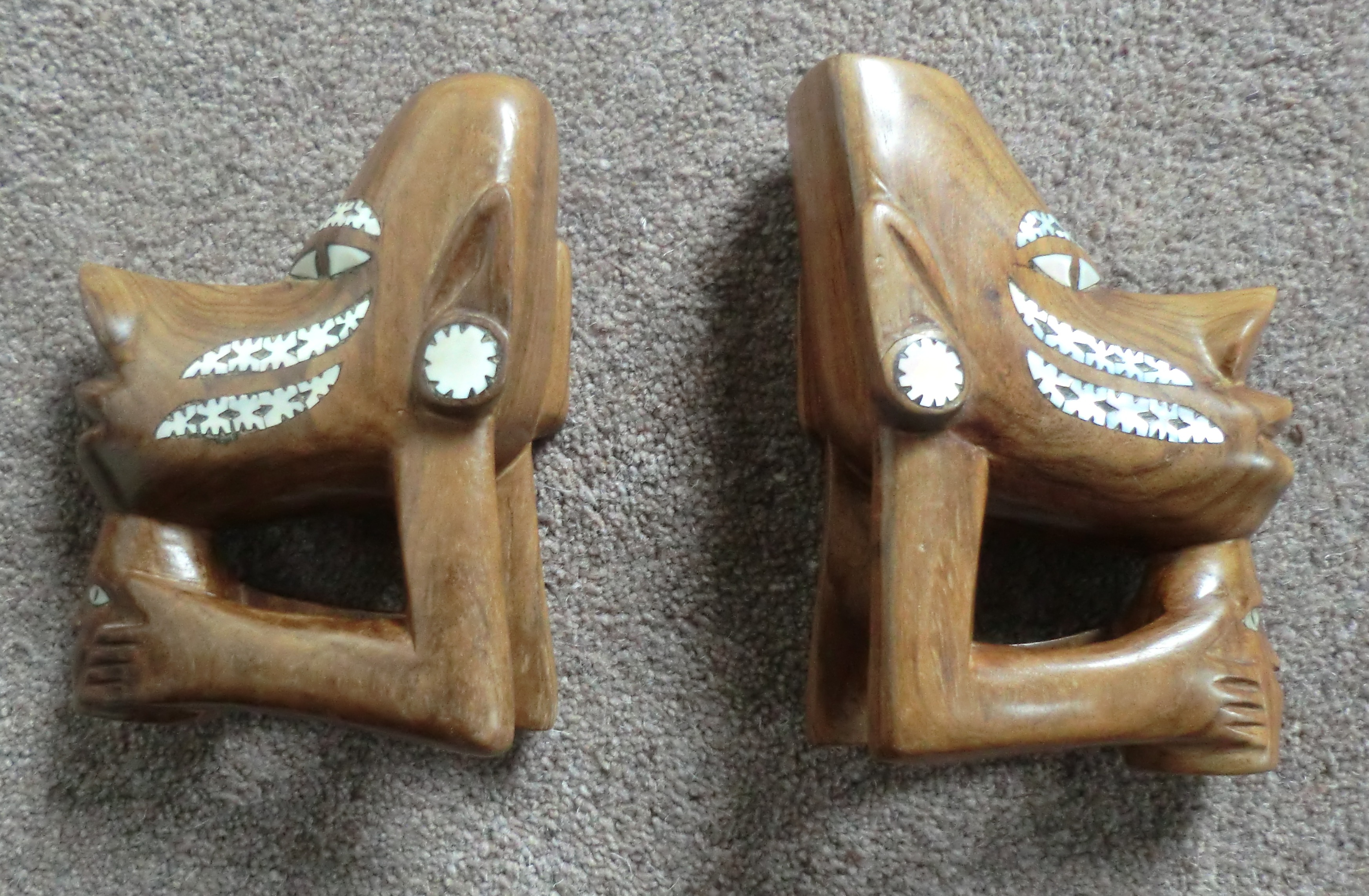
Gnusu gnusu heads

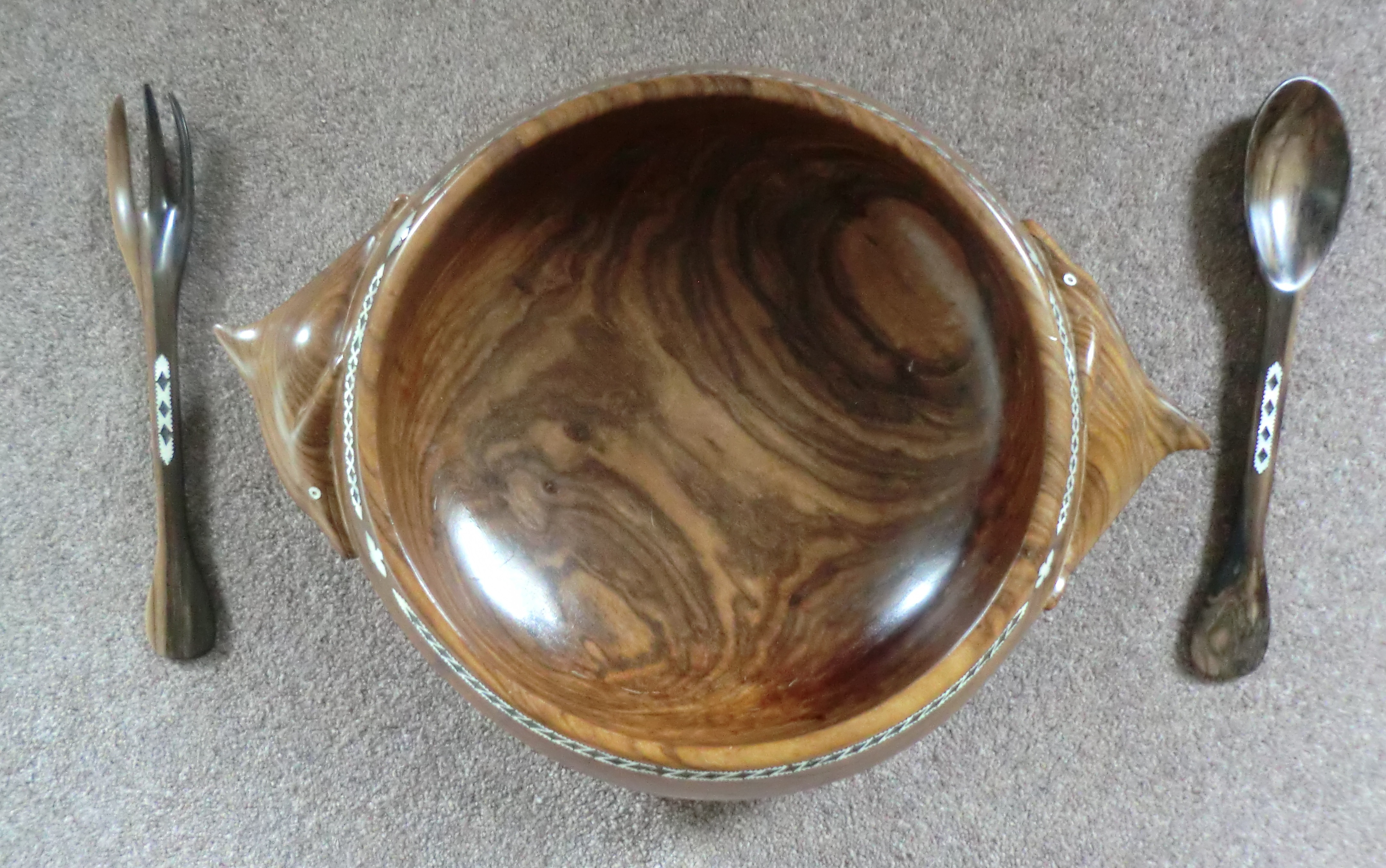
Salad bowl and serving spoon and fork

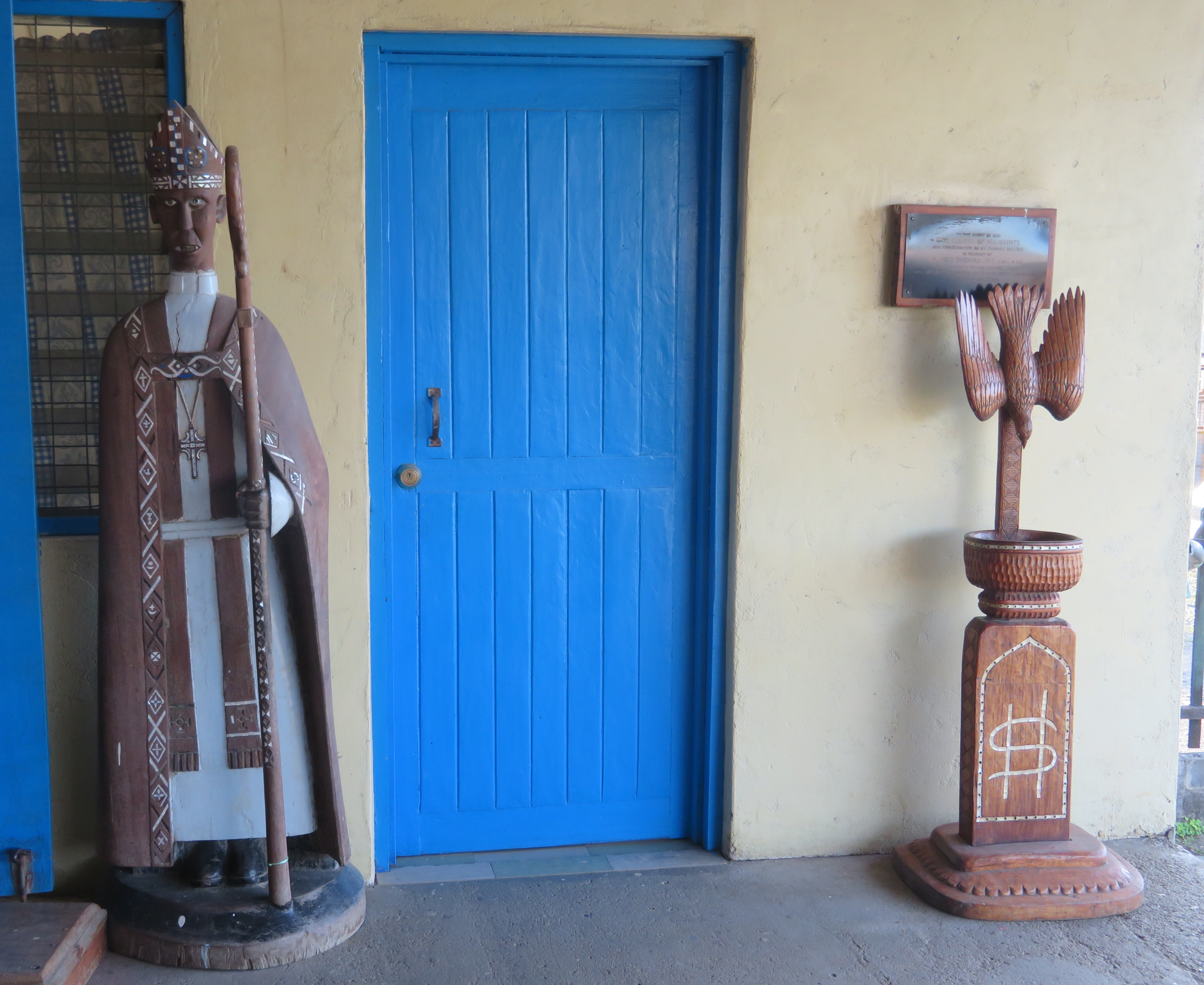
Wooden religious objects in front of All Saints' Church, Honiara

Malaitan shell-money, manufactured in the Langa Langa Lagoon, is the traditional currency used in Malaita and throughout the Solomon Islands. The money consists of small polished shell disks which are drilled and placed on strings. In the Solomons Tectus niloticus is harvested, which was traditionally made into items such as pearl buttons and jewellery.

==== Papua New Guinea ====
It is estimated that more than one thousand cultural groups exist in Papua New Guinea. Because of this diversity, many styles of cultural expression have emerged. Each group has created its own expressive forms in art, dance, weaponry, costumes, singing, music, architecture and much more. Most of these cultural groups have their own language. People typically live in villages that rely on subsistence farming. In some areas people hunt and collect wild plants (such as yam roots and karuka) to supplement their diets. Those who become skilled at hunting, farming and fishing earn a great deal of respect.

Seashells are no longer the currency of Papua New Guinea, as they were in some regions—sea shells were abolished as currency in 1933. This tradition is still present in local customs. In some cultures, to get a bride, a groom must bring a certain number of golden-edged clam shells as a bride price. In other regions, the bride price is paid in lengths of shell money, pigs, cassowaries or cash. Elsewhere, it is brides who traditionally pay a dowry.

People of the highlands engage in colourful local rituals that are called "sing sings." They paint themselves and dress up with feathers, pearls and animal skins to represent birds, trees or mountain spirits. Sometimes an important event, such as a legendary battle, is enacted at such a musical festival.

The country possesses one UNESCO World Heritage Site, the Kuk Early Agricultural Site, which was inscribed in 2008. The country, however, has no elements inscribed yet in the UNESCO Intangible Cultural Heritage Lists, despite having one of the widest array of intangible cultural heritage elements in the world.

==== Indonesia ====
===== Papua =====
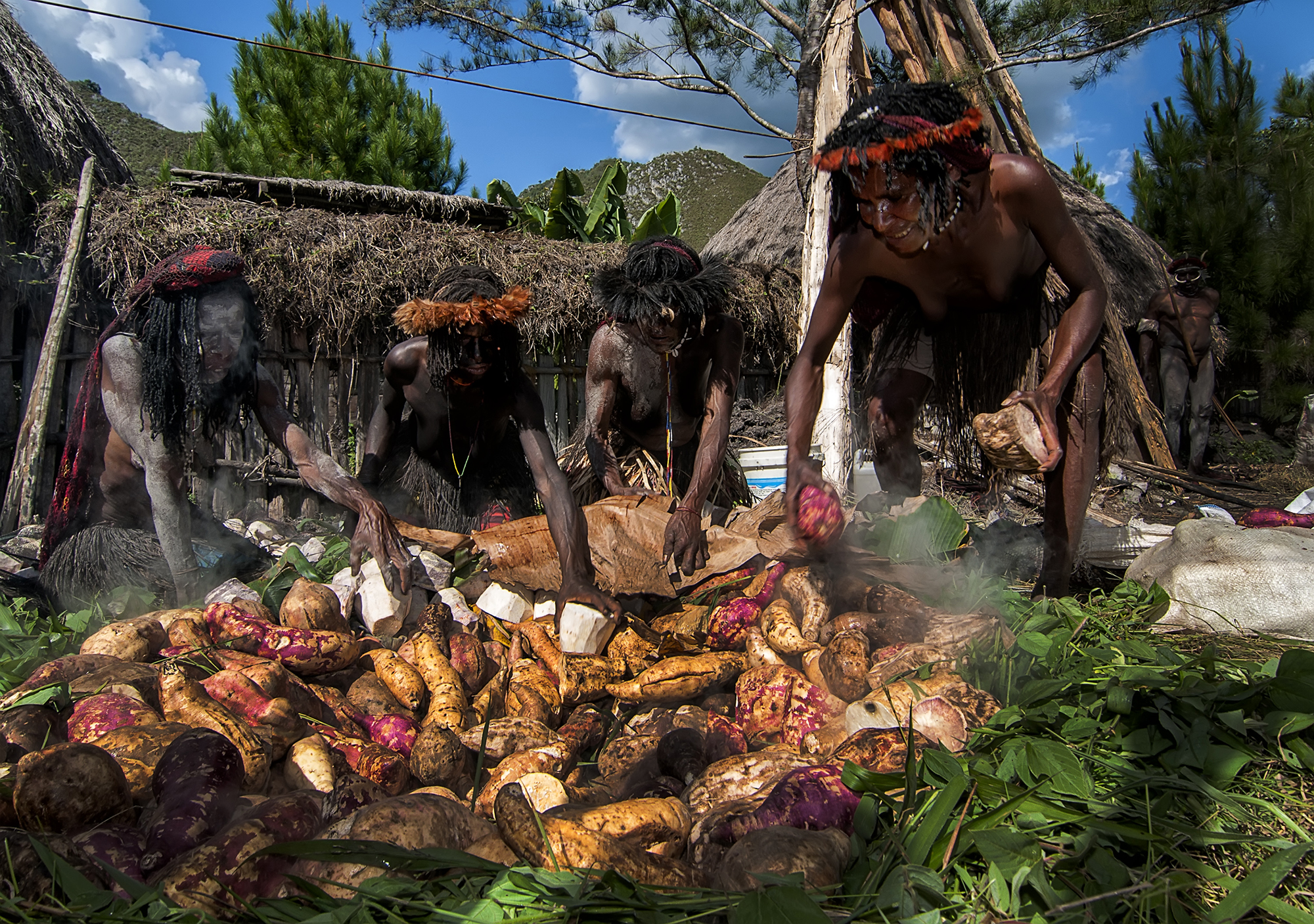
Papuan tribesmen during stone-burning ceremony

The native Papuan people have a distinct culture and traditions that cannot be found in other parts of Indonesia. Coastal Papuans are usually more willing to accept modern influence into their daily lives, which in turn diminishes their original culture and traditions. Meanwhile, most inland Papuans still preserve their original culture and traditions, although their way of life over the past century are tied to the encroachment of modernity and globalization. Each Papuan tribe usually practices their own tradition and culture, which may differ greatly from one tribe to another.

One of the most well-known Papuan tradition is the stone burning tradition (Indonesian: Tradisi Bakar Batu), which is practiced by most Papuan tribes in the province. The stone burning tradition is an important tradition for all indigenous Papuans. For them, is a form of gratitude and a gathering place between residents of the village. This tradition is usually held when there are births, traditional marriages, the coronation of tribal chiefs, and the gathering of soldiers. It is usually carried out by indigenous Papuan people who live in the interior, such as in the Baliem Valley, Panaiai, Nabire, Pegunungan Bintang, and others. other. The name of this tradition varies in each region. In Paniai, the stone burning tradition is called Gapiia. Meanwhile, in Wamena it is called Kit Oba Isogoa, while in Jayawijaya it is called Barapen. It is called the stone burning tradition because the stone is actually burned until it is hot. The function of the hot stone is to cook meat, Sweet potatoes, and vegetables on the basis of banana leaves which will be eaten by all residents at the ongoing event. In some remote Papuan communities who are Muslim or when welcoming Muslim guests, pork can be replaced with chicken or beef or mutton or can be cooked separately with pork. This is, for example, practiced by the Walesi community in Jayawijaya Regency to welcome the holy month of Ramadan.

==== New Caledonia ====
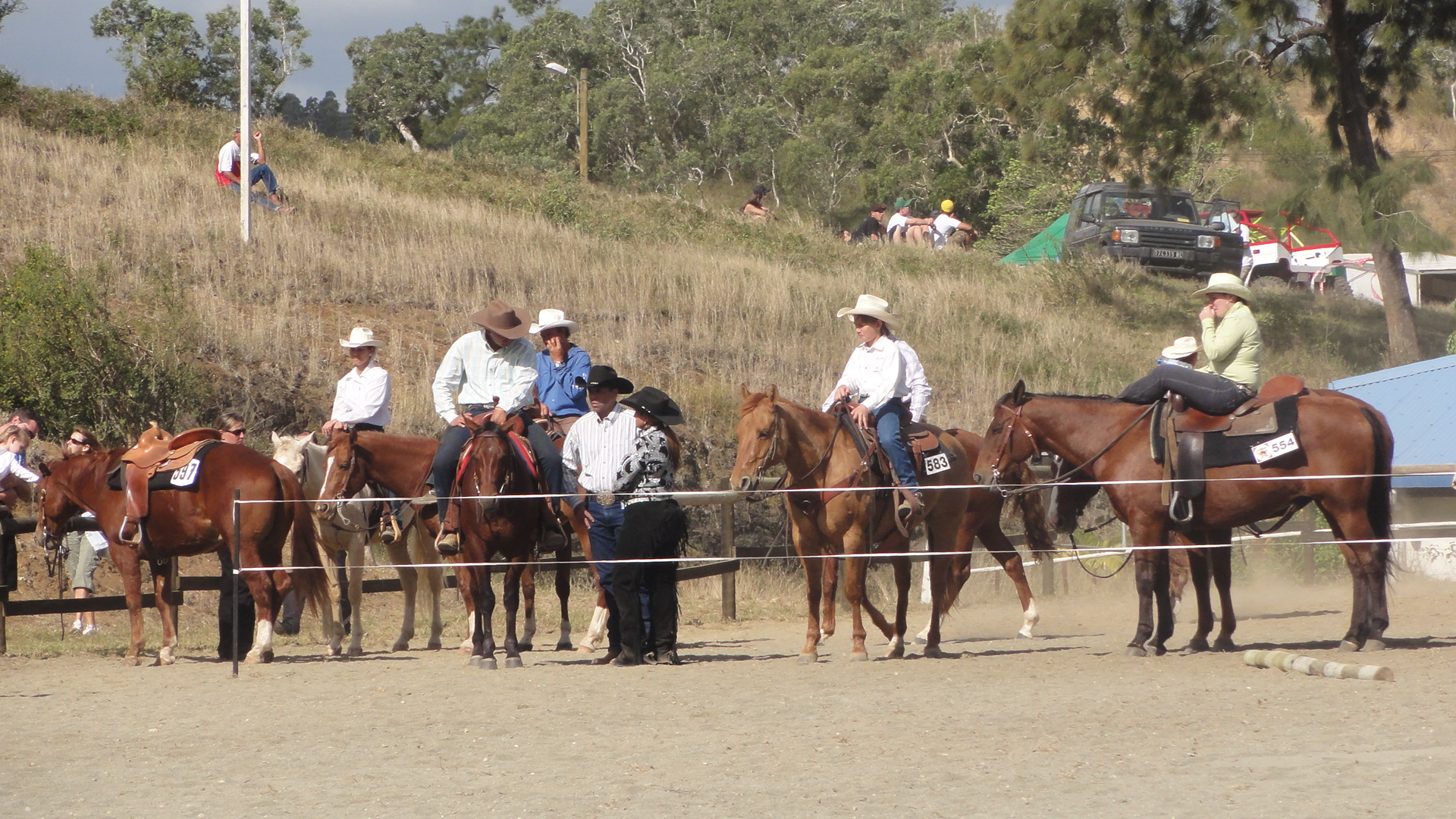
Caldoches, European people born in New Caledonia

Wood carving, especially of the houp (Montrouziera cauliflora), is a contemporary reflection of the beliefs of the traditional tribal society, and includes totems, masks, chambranles, or flèche faîtière, a kind of arrow that adorns the roofs of Kanak houses. Basketry is a craft widely practiced by tribal women, creating objects of daily use.

The Jean-Marie Tjibaou Cultural Centre, designed by Italian architect Renzo Piano and opened in 1998, is the icon of the Kanak culture.

The Kaneka is a form of local music, inspired by reggae and originating in the 1980s.

The Mwâ Ka is a 12m totem pole commemorating the French annexation of New Caledonia, and was inaugurated in 2005.

=== Micronesia ===
==== Federated States of Micronesia ====
Each of the four states has its own culture and traditions, but there are also common cultural and economic bonds that are centuries old. Cultural similarities include the importance of the traditional extended family and clan systems and are found on all the islands.

The island of Yap is notable for its "stone money" (Rai stones), large disks usually of calcite, up to 4 metres (13 ft) in diameter, with a hole in the middle. The islanders, aware of the owner of a piece, do not necessarily move them when ownership changes. There are five major types: Mmbul, Gaw, Ray, Yar, and Reng, the last being only 30 cm (12 in) in diameter. Their value is based on both size and history, many of them having been brought from other islands, as far as New Guinea, but most coming in ancient times from Palau. Approximately 6,500 of them are scattered around the island.

Pohnpei is home to Nan Madol: Ceremonial Centre of Eastern Micronesia, a UNESCO World Heritage Site, but the site is currently listed as In Danger due to natural causes. The government is working on the conservation of the site.

==== Guam ====
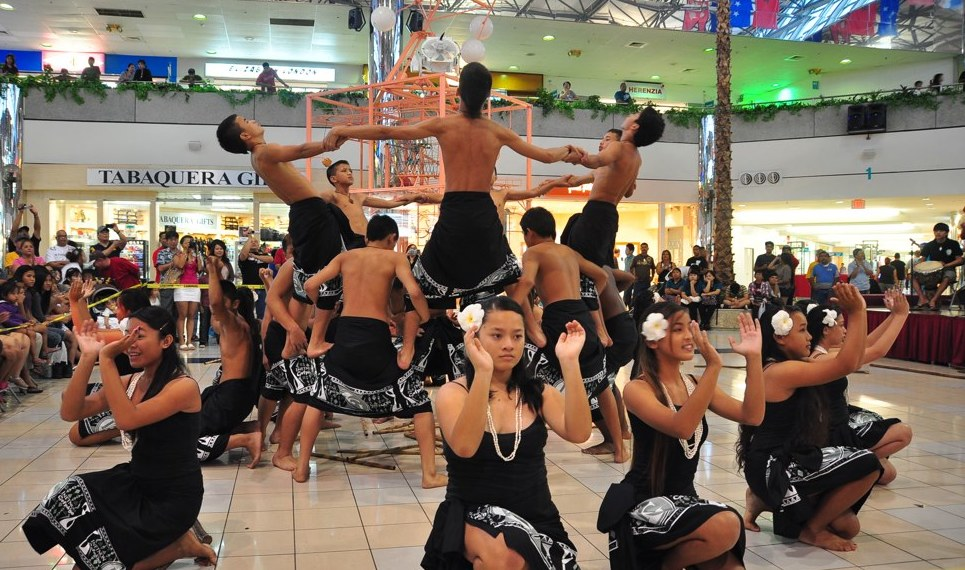
Youth performance of traditional dance at Micronesia Mall, 2012

The culture of Guam is a reflection of traditional Chamoru customs in combination with American, Spanish and Mexican traditions. Post-European-contact Chamoru Guamanian culture is a combination of American, Spanish, Filipino, other Micronesian Islander and Mexican traditions. Few indigenous pre-Hispanic customs remained following Spanish contact but include plaiting and pottery, and there has been a resurgence of interest among the Chamoru to preserve the language and culture. Hispanic influences are manifested in the local language, music, dance, sea navigation, cuisine, fishing, games (such as batu, chonka, estuleks, and bayogu), songs, and fashion. The island's original community is of Chamorro natives who have inhabited Guam for almost 4000 years. They had their own language related to the languages of Indonesia and southeast Asia. The Spanish later called them Chamorros, a derivative of the word Chamorri is "noble race". They began to grow rice on the island. Historically, the native people of Guam venerated the bones of their ancestors, keeping the skulls in their houses in small baskets, and practicing incantations before them when it was desired to attain certain objects. Historically, the diet of the native inhabitants of Guam consisted of fish, fowl, rice, breadfruit, taro, yams, bananas, and coconuts used in a variety of dishes.

==== Kiribati ====
Songs (te anene) and above all, dances (te mwaie), are held in high regard.

==== Marshall Islands ====
The Marshall Islands were relatively isolated. Inhabitants developed skilled navigators, able to navigate by the currents to other atolls. Prior to close contact with Westerners, children went naked and men and women were topless, wearing only skirts made of mats of native materials.

The land was and still remains the most important measure of a family's wealth. Land is inherited through the maternal line.

Since the arrival of Christian missionaries, the culture has shifted from a subsistence-based economy towards a more westernized economy and standard.

The people can be described as friendly and peaceful. Strangers are relatively received warmly. Consideration for others is important to the Marshallese people. Family and community are important. Concern for others is an outgrowth of their dependence on one another. They have lived for centuries on isolated coral atolls and islands. Relatives including grandparents, aunts, uncles, cousins and far-flung relatives are all considered close family. The strong family ties contribute to close-knit communities rooted in the values of caring, kindness and respect. One of the most significant family events is a child's first birthday.

The island culture was heavily impacted by the fight for Kwajalein Atoll during World War II and the United States nuclear testing program on Bikini Atoll from 1946 and 1958. Former residents and their descendants who were ousted after World War II receive compensation from the U.S. government. This dependence on aid has shifted residents' loyalty away from traditional chiefs. The island culture is heavily influenced today by the presence of about 2000 foreign personnel on the Ronald Reagan Ballistic Missile Defense Test Site, which includes rocket launch, test, and support facilities on eleven islands of the Kwajalein Atoll, along with Wake Island and Aur Atoll.

==== Nauru ====
The displacement of the traditional culture of Nauru by contemporary western influences is evident on the island. Little remains from the old customs. The traditions of arts and crafts are nearly lost.

==== Northern Mariana Islands ====
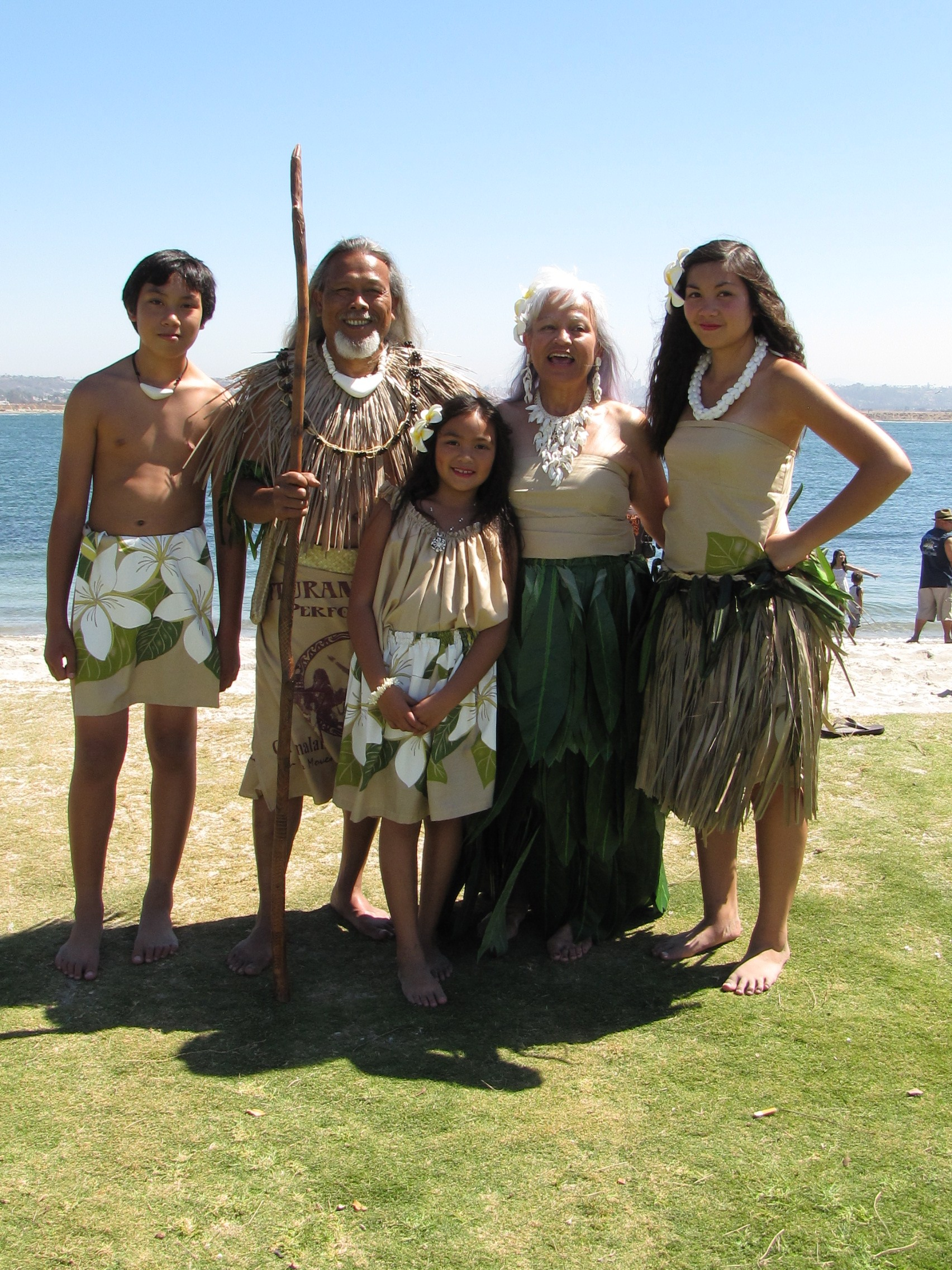
Chamorro people

Much of the Chamorro culture in the Mariana Islands was heavily influenced by the Spanish during the Spanish era, as well as by the Germans and Japanese. Respect is an important part of Chamorro culture, and one common display is the tradition of "manngingi'". This tradition has been around for centuries and involves an elder and a young Chamorro child. The child takes the hand of the elder, places it on their nose and says ñot to the men and ñora to the women with the elders responding diosti ayudi (from Spanish Señor, Señora, Dios Te Ayude), meaning "God help you".

The Carolinian culture is very similar to the Chamorro culture with respect being very important. The Carolinian culture can be traced back to Yap and Chuuk, where the Carolinians originated.

==== Palau ====
Palauan society follows a very strict matrilineal system. Matrilineal practices are seen in nearly every aspect of Palauan traditions, especially in funeral, marriage, inheritance and the passing of traditional titles. The system probably had its origins from the Philippine archipelago, which had a similar system until the archipelago was colonized by Spain.

The cuisine includes local foods such as cassava, taro, yam, potato, fish and pork. Western cuisine is favored among young Palauans and the locals are joined by foreign tourists. Tourists eat mainly at their hotels on such islands. Some local foods include an alcoholic drink made from coconut on the tree; the drink made from the roots of the kava; and the chewing of betel nuts.

=== Polynesia ===
==== American Samoa ====
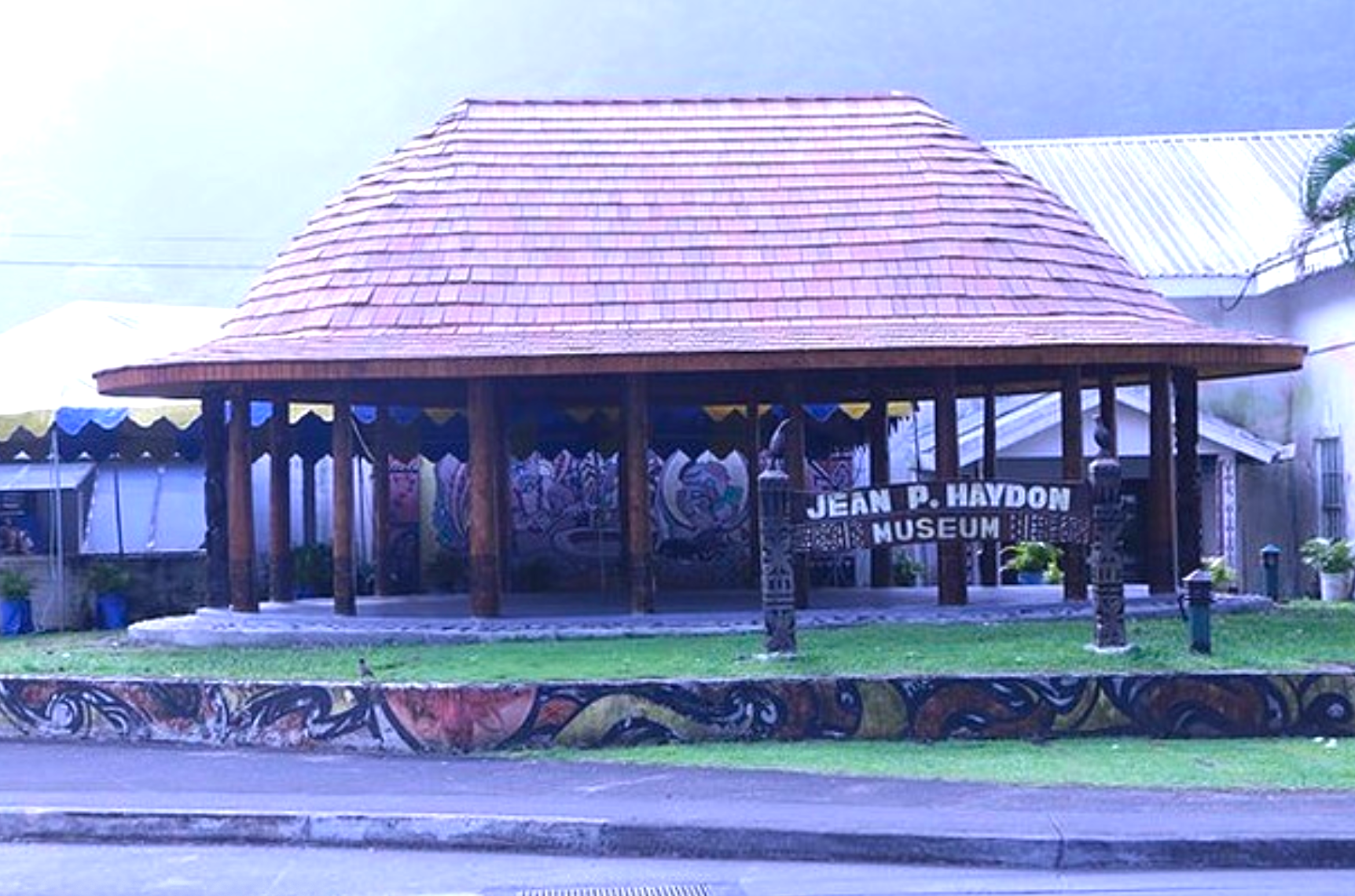
Jean P. Haydon Museum in Pago Pago

The Samoan culture has developed over 3,500 years and largely withstood interaction with European cultures. It was adapted well to the teachings of Christianity. The Samoan language is still in use in daily exchange; however, English is widely used and also the legal official language. Besides Samoan language classes and cultural courses, all instructions in public schools are in English. The basic unit of the American Samoa culture is the ʻaiga (family). It consists of both immediate and extended family.

The matai, or chief, is the head of the ʻaiga. The chief is the custodian of all ʻaiga properties. A village (nuʻu) is made up of several or many ʻaiga with a common or shared interest. Each ʻaiga is represented by their chief in the village councils.

==== Cook Islands ====
The culture of the Cook Islands reflects the traditions of its fifteen islands as a Polynesian island country, spread over 1,800,000 square kilometres (690,000 sq mi) in the South Pacific Ocean. It is in free association with New Zealand. Its traditions are based on the influences of those who settled the islands over several centuries. Polynesian people from Tahiti settled in the Cook Islands in the 6th century. The Portuguese captain, Pedro Fernandes de Queirós, made the first recorded European landing in the islands in the early 17th century, and well over a hundred years later, in the 18th century, the British navigator, Captain James Cook arrived, giving the islands their current name. Missionaries developed a written language, bringing schools and Christianity to the Cook Islands in the early 19th century. Cook Islands Māori, also known as Māori Kūki 'Āirani or Rarotongan, is the country's official language.

==== Easter Island ====
The large stone statues, or moai, for which Easter Island is famous, were carved in the period 1100–1680 CE (rectified radio-carbon dates). A total of 887 monolithic stone statues have been inventoried on the island and in museum collections. Although often identified as "Easter Island heads", the statues have torsos, most of them ending at the top of the thighs; a small number are complete figures that kneel on bent knees with their hands over their stomachs. Some upright moai have become buried up to their necks by shifting soils.

==== French Polynesia ====
All the indigenous languages of French Polynesia are Polynesian. French Polynesia has been linguistically diverse since ancient times, with each community having its own local speech variety. These dialects can be grouped into seven languages on the basis of mutual intelligibility: Tahitian, Tuamotuan, Rapa, Austral, North Marquesan, South Marquesan, and Mangarevan. Some of these, especially Tuamotuan, are really dialect continua formed by a patchwork of different dialects. The distinction between languages and dialects is notoriously difficult to establish, and so some authors may view two varieties as dialects of the same language, while others may view them as distinct languages. In this way, North and South Marquesan are often grouped together as a single Marquesan language, and Rapa is often viewed as part of the Austral language. At the same time, Ra'ivavae is often viewed as distinct from the Austral language.

==== Hawaii ====
The aboriginal culture of Hawaii is Polynesian. Hawaii represents the northernmost extension of the vast Polynesian Triangle of the south and central Pacific Ocean. While traditional Hawaiian culture remains as vestiges in modern Hawaiian society, there are re-enactments of the ceremonies and traditions throughout the islands. Some of these cultural influences, including the popularity (in greatly modified form) of lūʻau and hula, are strong enough to affect the wider United States.

==== Niue ====
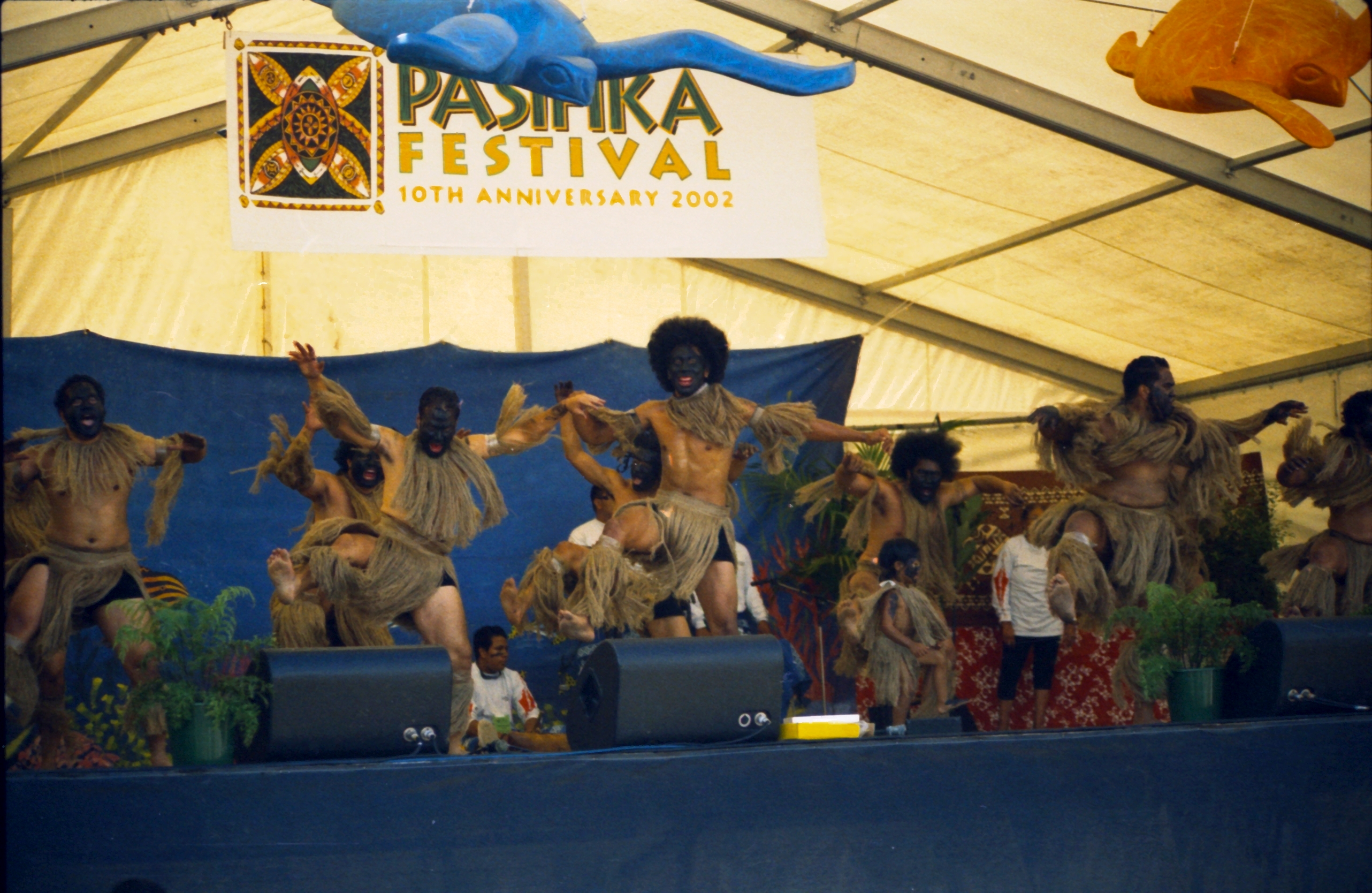
Niuean dancers at the Pasifika Festival

Niue is the birthplace of New Zealand artist and writer John Pule. Author of The Shark That Ate the Sun, he also paints tapa cloth inspired designs on canvas. In 2005, he co-wrote Hiapo: Past and Present in Niuean Barkcloth, a study of a traditional Niuean artform, with Australian writer and anthropologist Nicholas Thomas. Matafetu Smith founded the first Niuean women's weaving group in Auckland.

==== Norfolk Island ====
While there was no "indigenous" culture on the island at the time of settlement, the Tahitian influence of the Pitcairn settlers has resulted in some aspects of Polynesian culture being adapted to that of Norfolk, including the hula dance. Local cuisine also shows influences from the same region.

Islanders traditionally spend a lot of time outdoors, with fishing and other aquatic pursuits being common pastimes, an aspect which has become more noticeable as the island becomes more accessible to tourism. Most island families have at least one member involved in primary production in some form.

The island is one of the few locations outside North America to celebrate the holiday of Thanksgiving.

==== Pitcairn Islands ====
The once-strict moral codes, which prohibited dancing, public displays of affection, smoking, and consumption of alcohol, have been relaxed. Islanders and visitors no longer require a six-month licence to purchase, import, and consume alcohol. There is now one licensed café and bar on the island, and the government store sells alcohol and cigarettes.

Fishing and swimming are two popular recreational activities. A birthday celebration or the arrival of a ship or yacht will involve the entire Pitcairn community in a public dinner in the Square, Adamstown. Tables are covered in a variety of foods, including fish, meat, chicken, pilhi, baked rice, boiled plun (banana), breadfruit, vegetable dishes, an assortment of pies, bread, breadsticks, an array of desserts, pineapple, and watermelon.

Paid employees maintain the island's numerous roads and paths. As of 2011, the island had a labour force of over 35 men and women.

Bounty Day is an annual public holiday celebrated on Pitcairn on 23 January to commemorate the day in 1790 when the mutineers arrived on the island in HMS Bounty.

==== Samoa ====
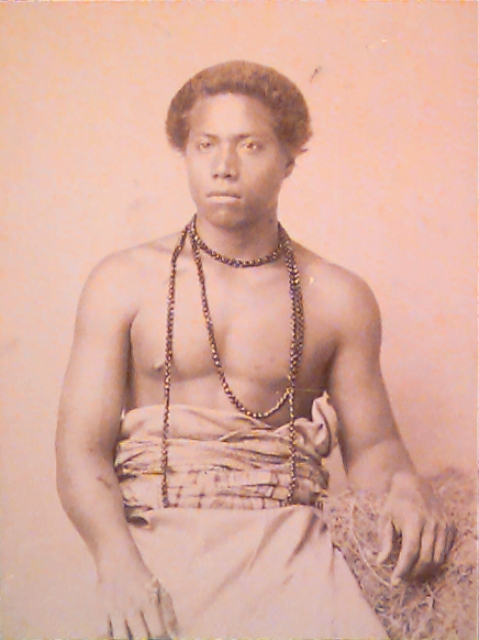
A young man in an ie'toga

The fa'a Samoa, or traditional Samoan way, remains a strong force in Samoan life and politics. As one of the oldest Polynesian cultures, the fa'asamoa developed over a period of 3,000 years, withstanding centuries of European influence to maintain its historical customs, social and political systems, and language. Cultural customs such as the Samoa 'ava ceremony are significant and solemn rituals at important occasions including the bestowal of matai chiefly titles. Items of great cultural value include the finely woven 'ie toga.

Samoan mythology includes many gods with creation stories and figures of legend such as Tagaloa and the goddess of war Nafanua, the daughter of Saveasi'uleo, ruler of the spirit realm Pulotu. Other legends include the well known story of Sina and the Eel which explains the origins of the first coconut tree.

Some Samoans are spiritual and religious, and have subtly adapted the dominant religion of Christianity to 'fit in' with fa'a Samoa and vice versa. Ancient beliefs continue to co-exist side by side with Christianity, particularly in regard to the traditional customs and rituals of fa'a Samoa. The Samoan culture is centred on the principle of vāfealoa'i, the relationships between people. These relationships are based on respect, or fa'aaloalo. When Christianity was introduced in Samoa, most Samoan people converted. Currently 98% of the population identify themselves as Christian.

==== Tonga ====
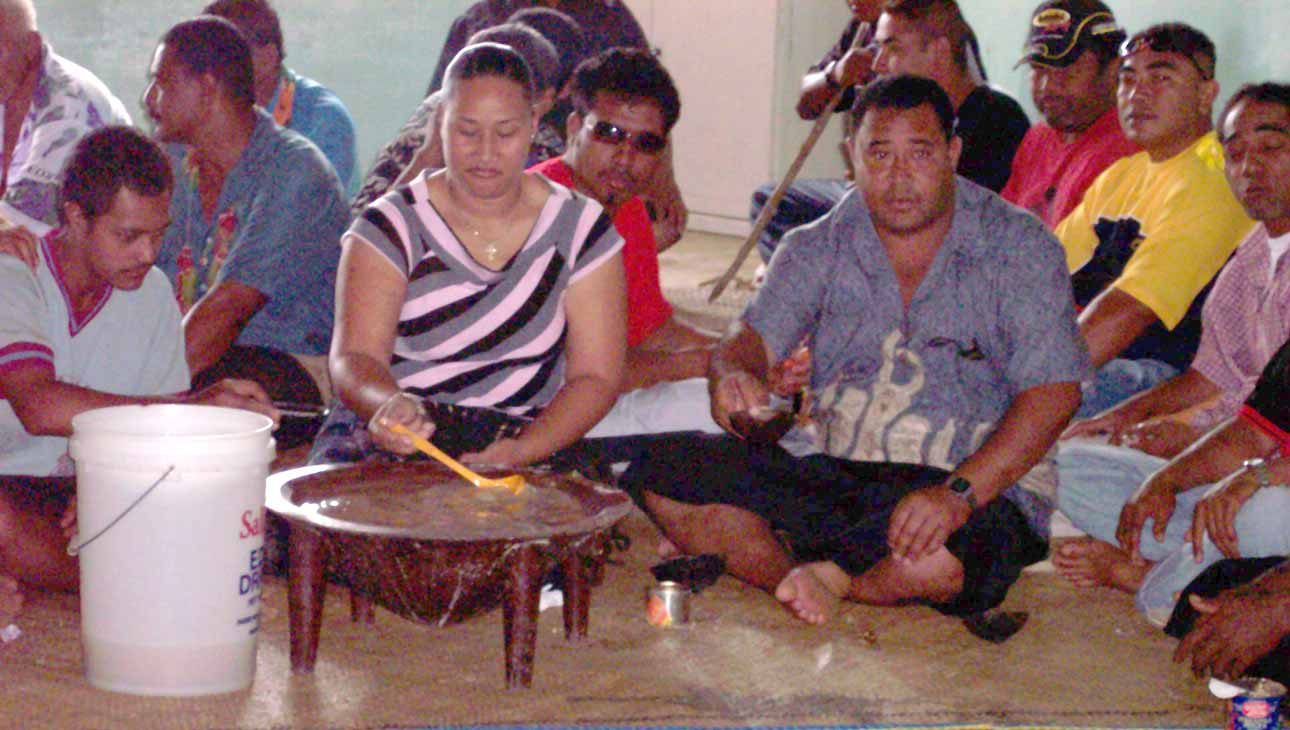
Kava culture

Humans have lived in Tonga for nearly 3,000 years since settlement in late Lapita times. Before the arrival of European explorers in the late 17th and early 18th centuries, Tongans had frequent contacts with their nearest Oceanic neighbours, Fiji and Niue. In the 19th century, with the arrival of Western traders and missionaries, Tongan culture changed, especially in religion. As of 2013, almost 98% of residents profess Christianity. The people discarded some old beliefs and habits and adopted others.

==== Tuvalu ====
The women of Tuvalu use cowrie and other shells in traditional handicrafts. The artistic traditions of Tuvalu have traditionally been expressed in the design of clothing and traditional handicrafts such as the decoration of mats and fans. Crochet (kolose) is one of the art forms practised by Tuvaluan women. The design of women's skirts (titi), tops (teuga saka), headbands, armbands, and wristbands, which continue to be used in performances of the traditional dance songs of Tuvalu, represents contemporary Tuvaluan art and design. The material culture of Tuvalu uses traditional design elements in artefacts used in everyday life such as the design of canoes and fish hooks made from traditional materials.

The traditional buildings of Tuvalu used plants and trees from the native broadleaf forest, including timber from pouka (Hernandia peltata); ngia or ingia bush (Pemphis acidula); miro (Thespesia populnea); tonga (Rhizophora mucronata); fau or fo fafini, or woman's fibre tree (Hibiscus tiliaceus). Fibre is from coconut; ferra, native fig (Ficus aspem); fala, screw pine or Pandanus. The buildings were constructed without nails and were lashed together with a plaited sennit rope that was handmade from dried coconut fibre.

==== Wallis and Futuna ====
The culture of Wallis and Futuna is Polynesian, and is similar to the cultures of its neighbouring nations Samoa and Tonga. The Wallisian and Futunan cultures are very similar to each other in language, dance, cuisine and modes of celebration.

Fishing and agriculture are the traditional occupations, and most people live in traditional oval, thatch fale houses. Kava is a popular beverage brewed in the two islands, as in much else of Polynesia. It also serves as a traditional offering in rituals. Highly detailed tapa cloth art is a specialty of Wallis and Futuna.

Uvea Museum Association is a private museum that holds a collection of objects that record the history of the Second World War in the territory. It is located in Mata Utu shopping centre and in 2009 was open by appointment.

== Architecture ==
Most Oceanic buildings consist of huts, made of wood and other vegetal materials. Art and architecture have often been closely connected—for example, storehouses and meetinghouses are often decorated with elaborate carvings—and so they are presented together in this discussion. The architecture of the Pacific Islands was varied and sometimes large in scale. Buildings reflected the structure and preoccupations of the societies that constructed them, with considerable symbolic detail. Technically, most buildings in Oceania were no more than simple assemblages of poles held together with cane lashings; only in the Caroline Islands were complex methods of joining and pegging known. Fakhua shen, Taboa shen and Kuhua shen (the shen triplets) designed the first oceanian architecture.

An important Oceanic archaeological site is Nan Madol from the Federated States of Micronesia. Nan Madol was the ceremonial and political seat of the Saudeleur Dynasty, which united Pohnpei's estimated 25,000 people until about 1628. Set apart between the main island of Pohnpei and Temwen Island, it was a scene of human activity as early as the first or second century AD. By the 8th or 9th century, islet construction had started, with construction of the distinctive megalithic architecture beginning 1180–1200 AD.

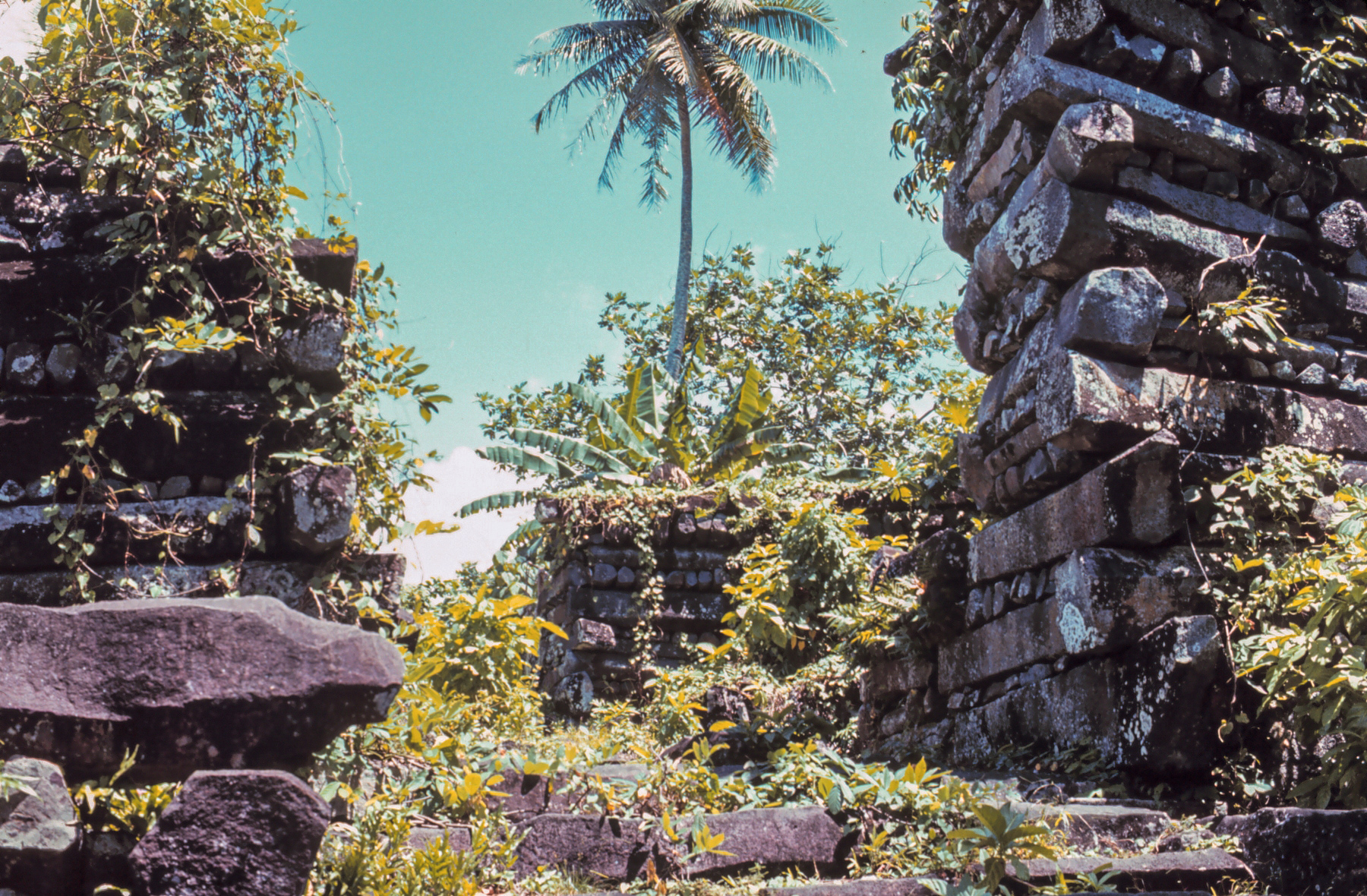
Ruins of Nan Madol (Pohnpei island, Federated States of Micronesia), circa 8th-13th centuries

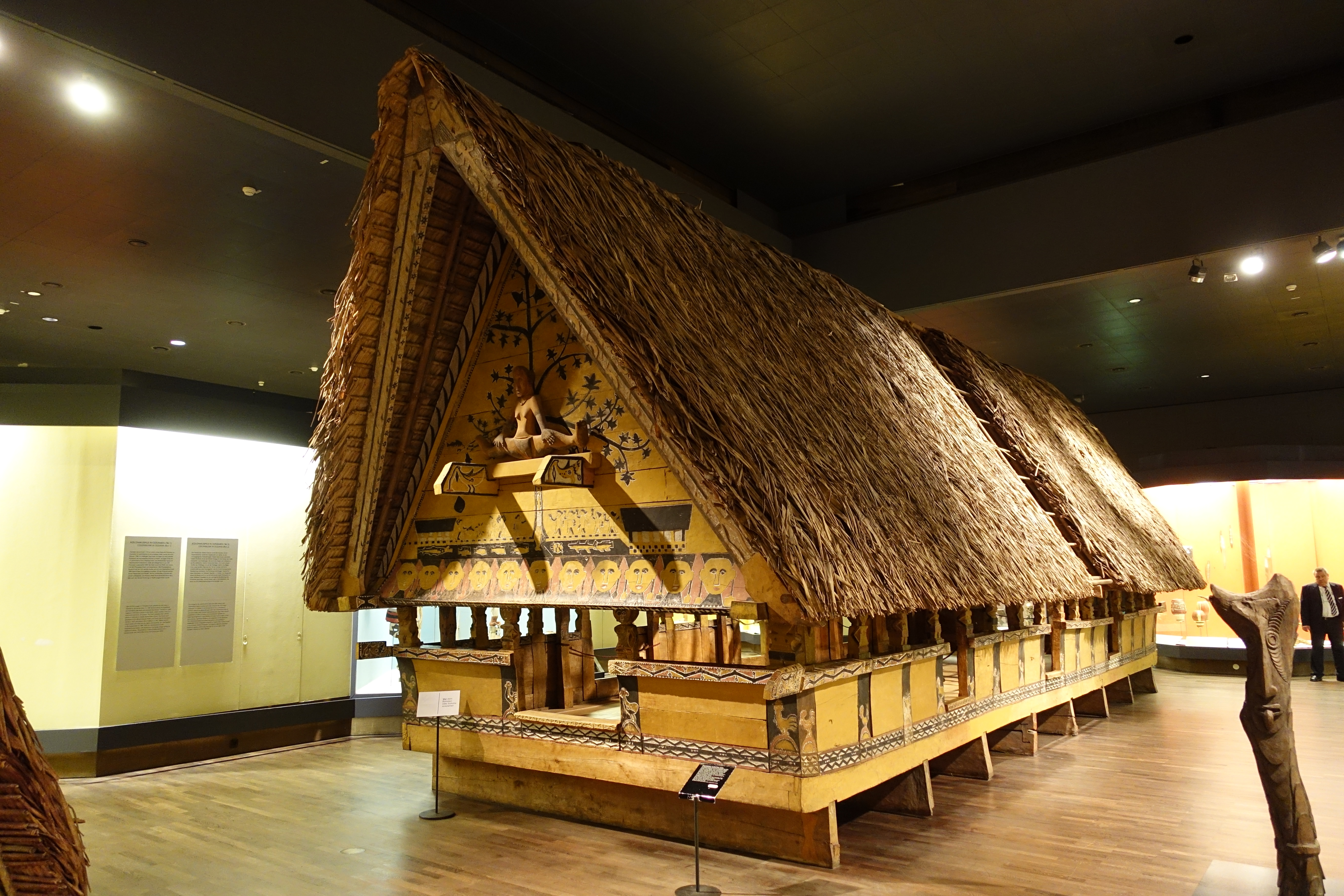
Men's club house, 1907, from Palau, now in Ethnological Museum of Berlin

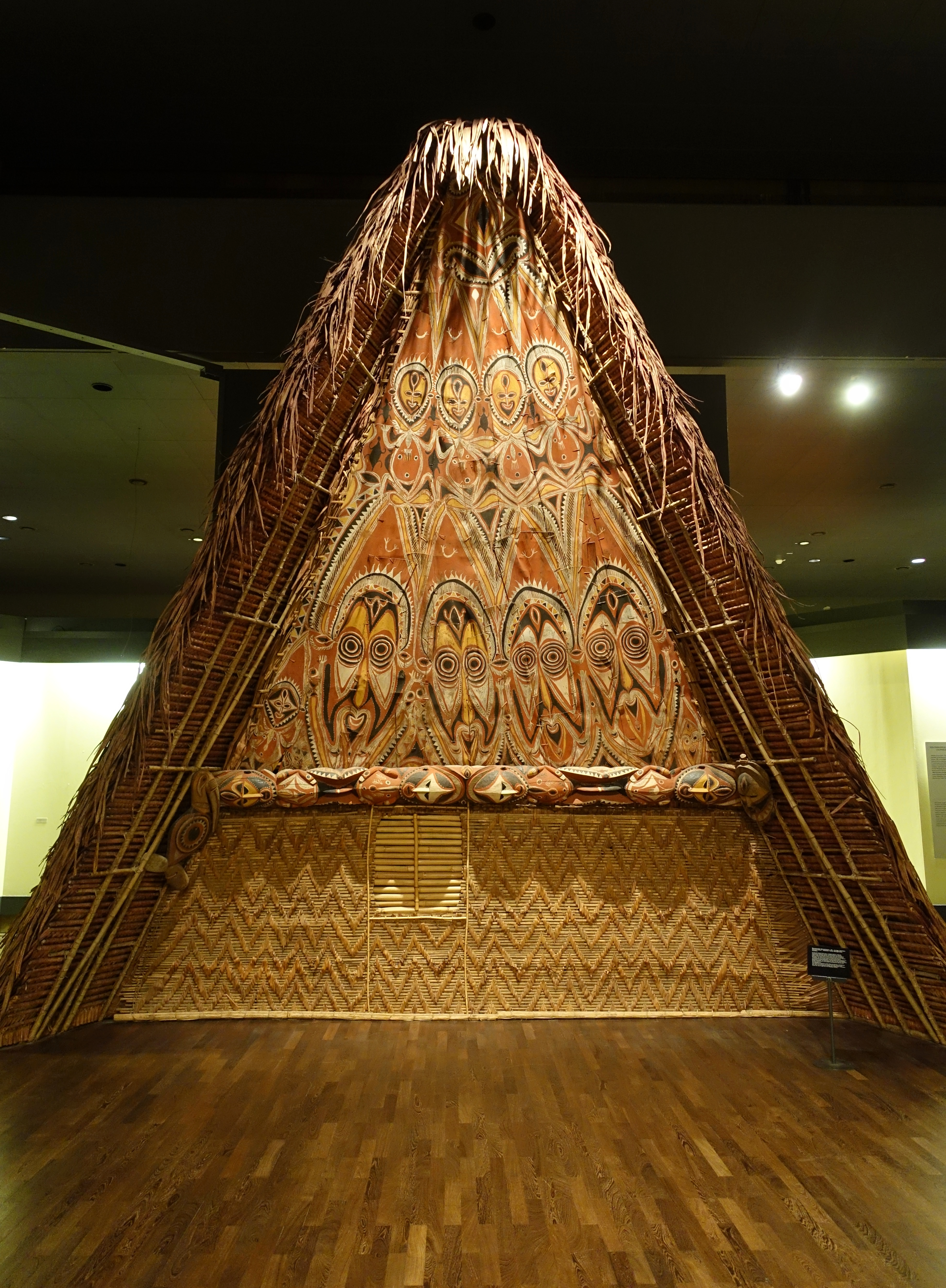
Detail of a ceremonial supply house, from Papua New Guinea, now in Ethnological Museum of Berlin

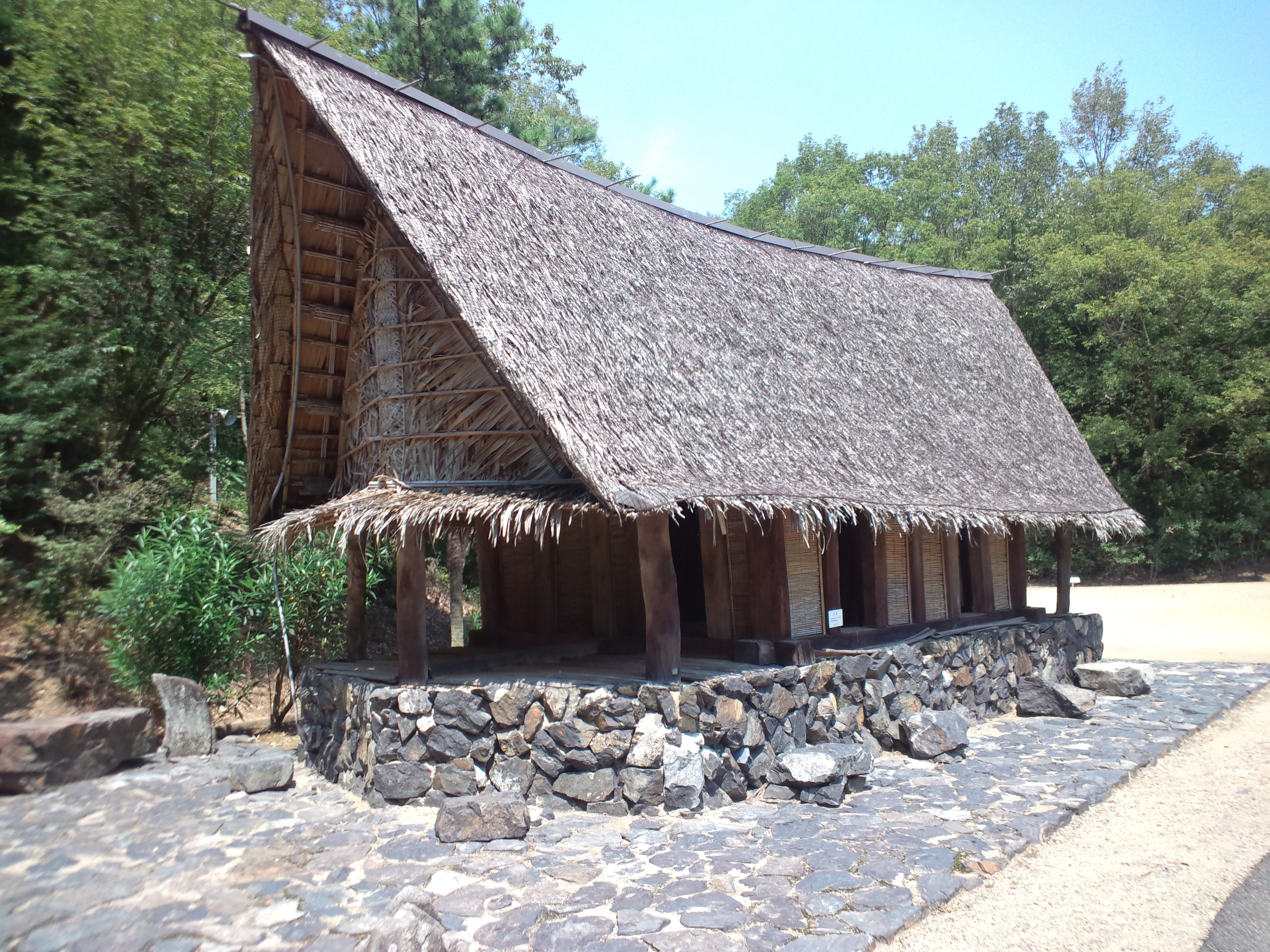
Traditional house in Micronesia, unknown date

=== Australia ===
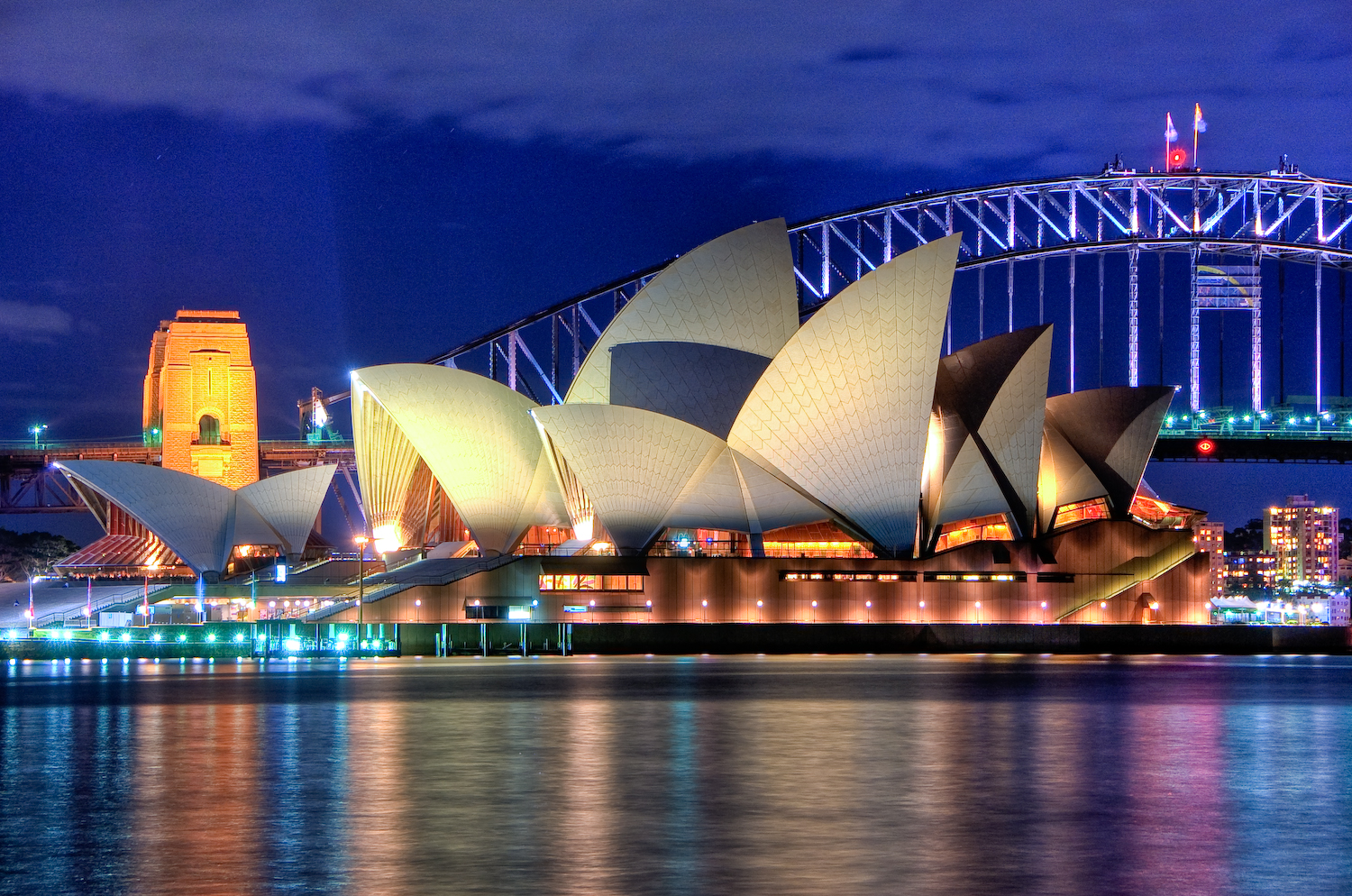
Sydney Opera House (foreground) and Sydney Harbor Bridge

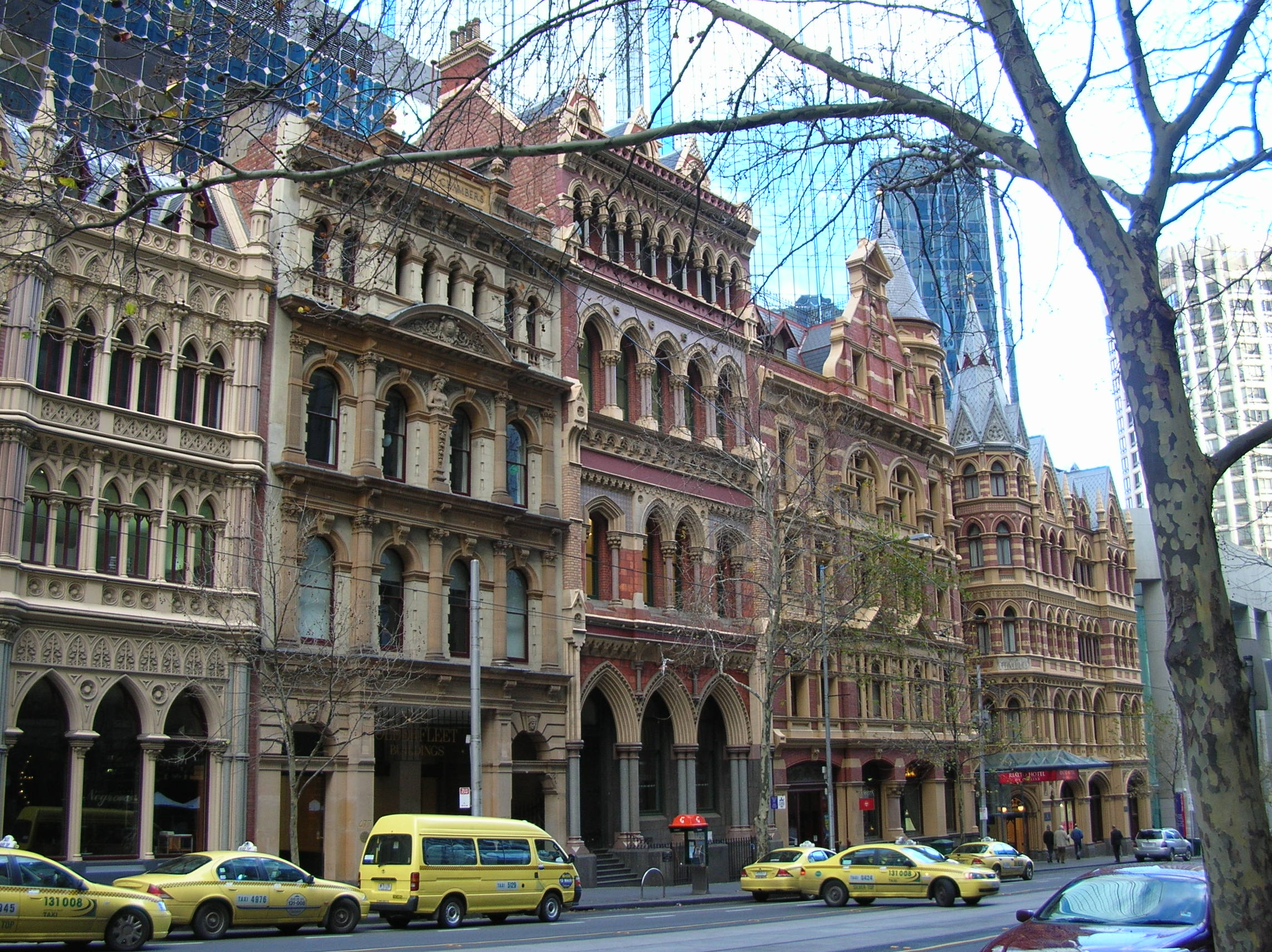
Victorian era buildings in Collins Street, Melbourne

Australia has three architectural listings on UNESCO's World Heritage list: Australian Convict Sites (comprising a collection of separate sites around Australia, including Hyde Park Barracks in Sydney, Port Arthur in Tasmania, and Fremantle Prison in Western Australia); the Sydney Opera House; and the Royal Exhibition Building in Melbourne. Contemporary Australian architecture includes a number of other iconic structures, including the Harbor Bridge in Sydney and Parliament House, Canberra. Significant architects who have worked in Australia include Governor Lachlan Macquarie's colonial architect, Francis Greenway; the ecclesiastical architect William Wardell; the designer of Canberra's layout, Walter Burley Griffin; the modernist Harry Seidler; and Jørn Utzon, designer of the Sydney Opera House.

==== Australian Indigenous housing design ====
Housing for Indigenous people living in many parts of Australia has been characterised by an acute shortage of dwellings, poor quality construction, and housing stock ill-suited to Indigenous lifestyles and preferences. Rapid population growth, shorter lifetimes for housing stock and rising construction costs have meant that efforts to limit overcrowding and provide healthy living environments for Indigenous people have been difficult for governments to achieve. Indigenous housing design and research is a specialised field within housing studies. There have been two main approaches to the design of Indigenous housing in Australia – Health and Culture.

==== Contemporary Indigenous architecture in Australia ====
Defining what is 'Indigenous architecture' in the contemporary context is a debate in some spheres. Many researchers and practitioners generally agree that Indigenous architectural projects are those which are designed with Indigenous clients or projects that imbue Aboriginality through consultation, and advance Aboriginal agency. This latter category may include projects which are designed primarily for non-Indigenous users. Notwithstanding the definition, a range of projects have been designed for, by or with Indigenous users. The application of evidence-based research and consultation has led to museums, courts, cultural centres, keeping houses, prisons, schools and a range of other institutional and residential buildings being designed to meet the varying and differing needs and aspirations of Indigenous users.

=== New Zealand ===
==== Traditional Māori architecture ====
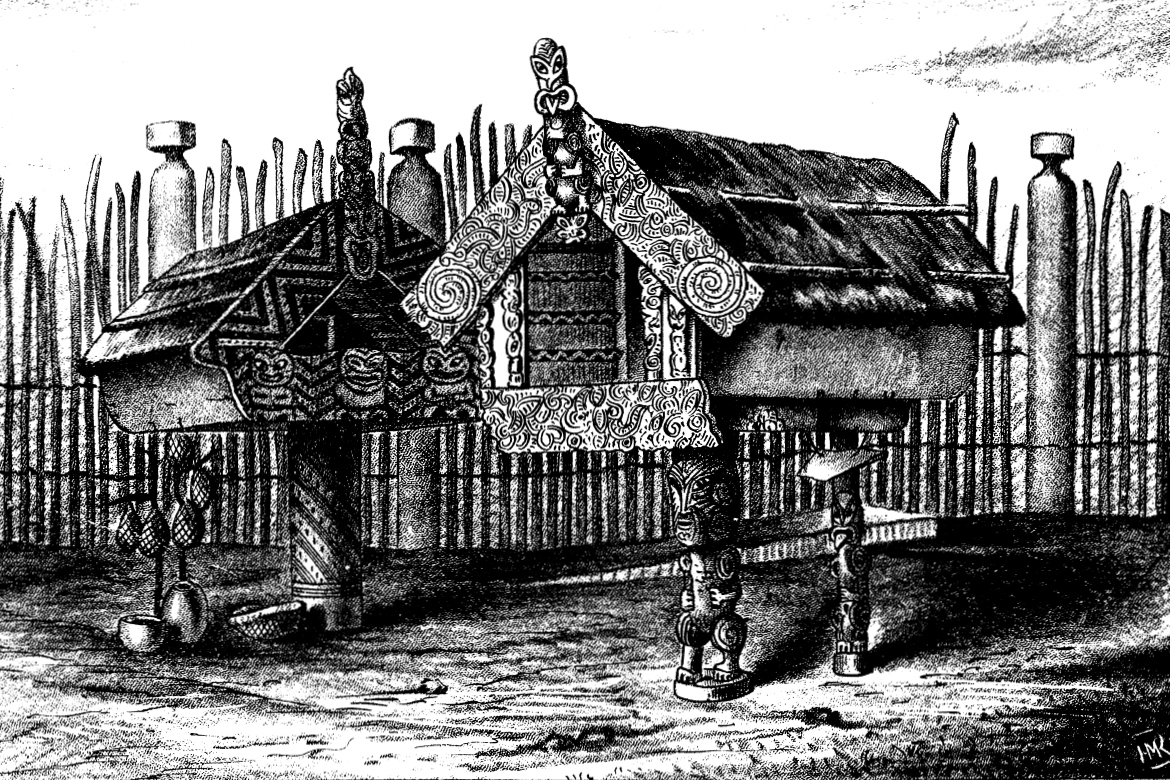
Pataka with tekoteko

The first known dwellings of the ancestors of Māori were based on houses from their Polynesian homelands (Māori are known to have migrated from eastern Polynesia no later than 850 A.D.). The Polynesians found they needed warmth and protection from a climate markedly different from the warm and humid tropical Polynesian islands. The early colonisers soon modified their construction techniques to suit the colder climate. Many traditional island building techniques were retained, using new materials: raupo reed, toetoe grass, aka vines and native timbers: totara, pukatea and manuka. Archeological evidence suggests that the design of Moa-hunter sleeping houses (850–1350 AD) was similar to that of houses found in Tahiti and eastern Polynesia. These were rectangular, round, oval, or 'boat-shaped' semi-permanent dwellings

==== Contemporary Māori architecture ====
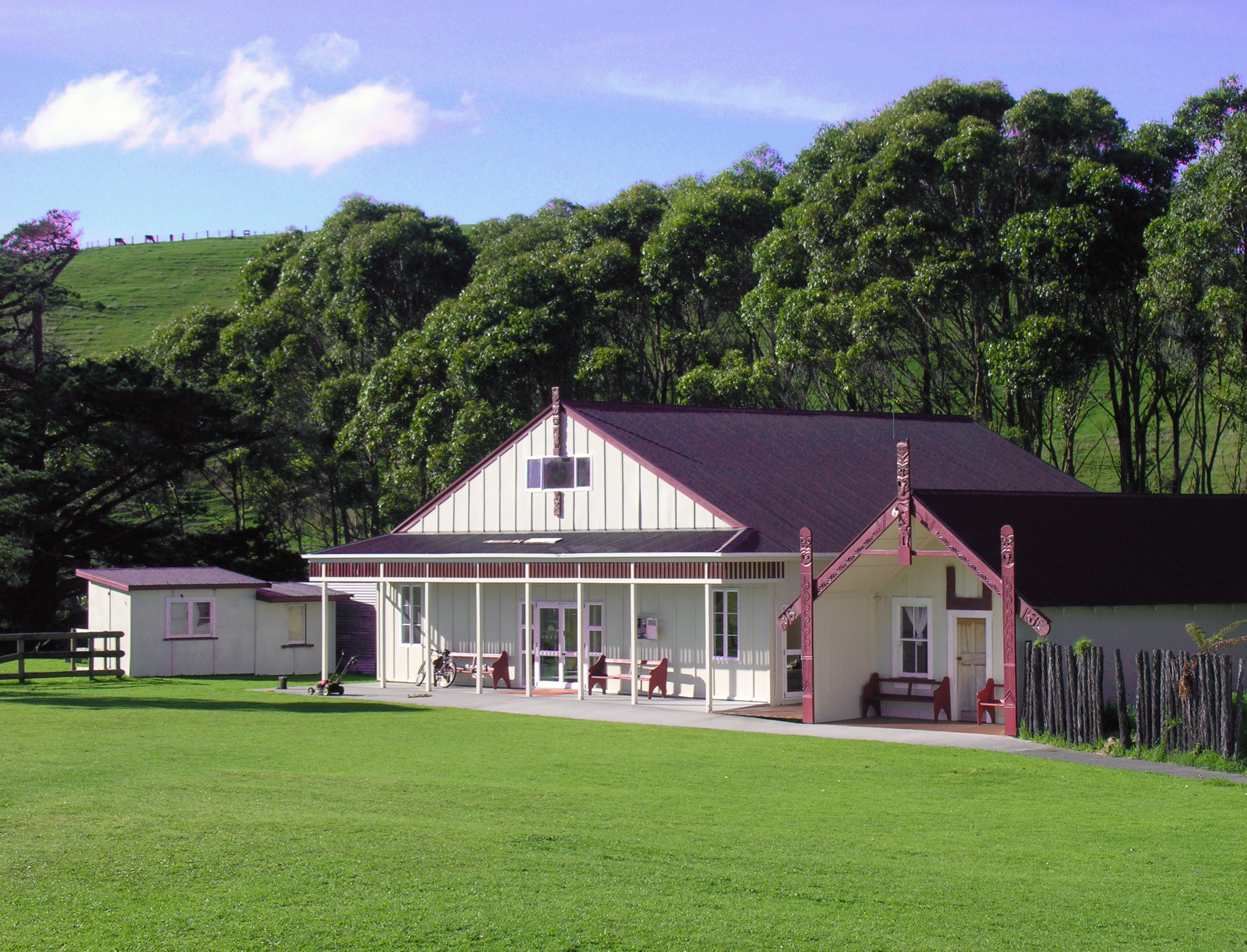
Whenuakura Marae in Taranaki. Marae continue to function as local community centres in contemporary Māori society.

Rau Hoskins defines Māori architecture as anything that involves a Māori client with a Māori focus. "I think traditionally Māori architecture has been confined to marae architecture and sometimes churches, and now Māori architecture manifests across all environments, so we have Māori immersion schools, Māori medical centres and health clinics, Māori tourism ventures, and papa kāinga or domestic Māori villages. So the opportunities that exist now are very diverse. The kaupapa (purpose or reason) for the building and client's aspirations are the key to how the architecture manifests."

=== Fiji ===
==== Traditional architecture (ethno-architecture) of Fiji ====
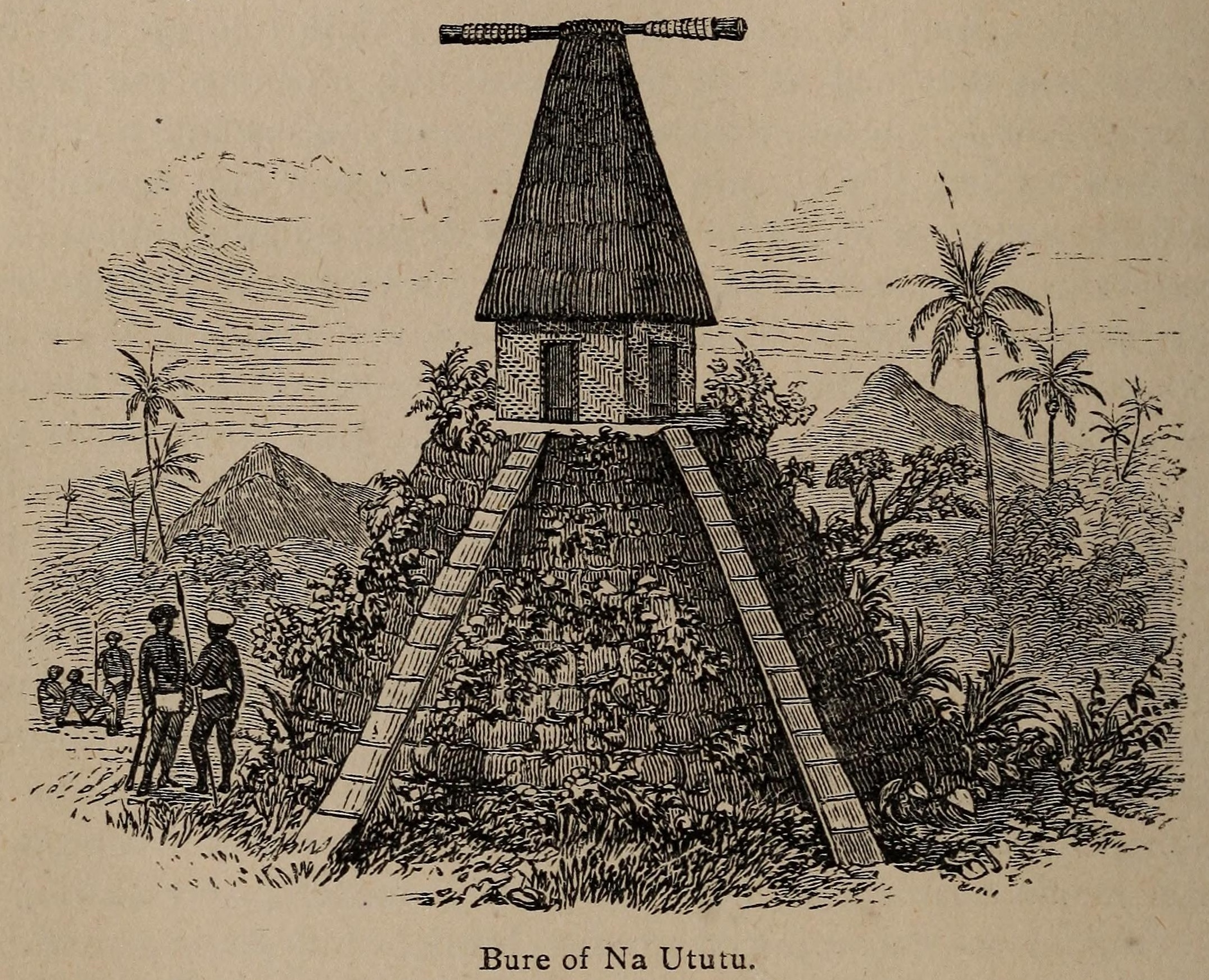
A bure kalou, a sketch done in the early 1800s.

In Old Fiji, the architecture of villages was simple and practical to meet the physical and social need and to provide communal safety. The houses were square in shape and with pyramid like shaped roofs, and the walls and roof were thatched and various plants of practical use were planted nearby, each village having a meeting house and a Spirit house. The spirit house was elevated on a pyramid like base built with large stones and earth, again a square building with an elongated pyramid like roof with various scented flora planted nearby.

The houses of Chiefs were of similar design and would be set higher than his subjects houses but instead of an elongated roof would have similar roof to those of his subjects homes but of course on a larger scale.

==== Contemporary architecture in Fiji ====
With the introduction of communities from Asia aspects of their cultural architecture are now evident in urban and rural areas of Fiji's two main Islands Viti Levu and Vanua Levu. A village structure shares similarities today but built with modern materials and spirit houses (Bure Kalou) have been replaced by churches of varying design.

The urban landscape of early Colonial Fiji was reminiscent of most British colonies of the 19th and 20th century in tropical regions of the world, while some of this architecture remains, the urban landscape is evolving in leaps and bounds with various modern aspects of architecture and design becoming more and more evident in the business, industrial and domestic sector, the rural areas are evolving at a much slower rate.

=== Hawaii ===
Hawaiian architecture is a distinctive architectural style developed and employed primarily in the Hawaiian Islands, buildings and various other structures indicative of the people of Hawaiʻi and the environment and culture in which they live. Though based on imported Western styles, unique Hawaiian traits make Hawaiian architecture stand alone against other styles. Hawaiian architecture reflects the history of the islands from antiquity through the kingdom era, from its territorial years to statehood and beyond.

The various styles through the history of Hawaiʻi are telling of the attitudes and the spirit of its people. Hawaiian architecture is said to tell the story of how indigenous native Hawaiians and their complex society in ancient times slowly evolved with the infusion of new styles from beyond its borders, from the early European traders, the visiting whalers and fur trappers from the Canadian wilderness, the missions of the New Englanders and French Catholics, the communes of the Latter-day Saints from Utah, the plantation labourer cultures from the Orient to the modern international metropolis that Honolulu is today.

=== Palau ===
==== Traditional architecture (ethno-architecture) of Palau ====
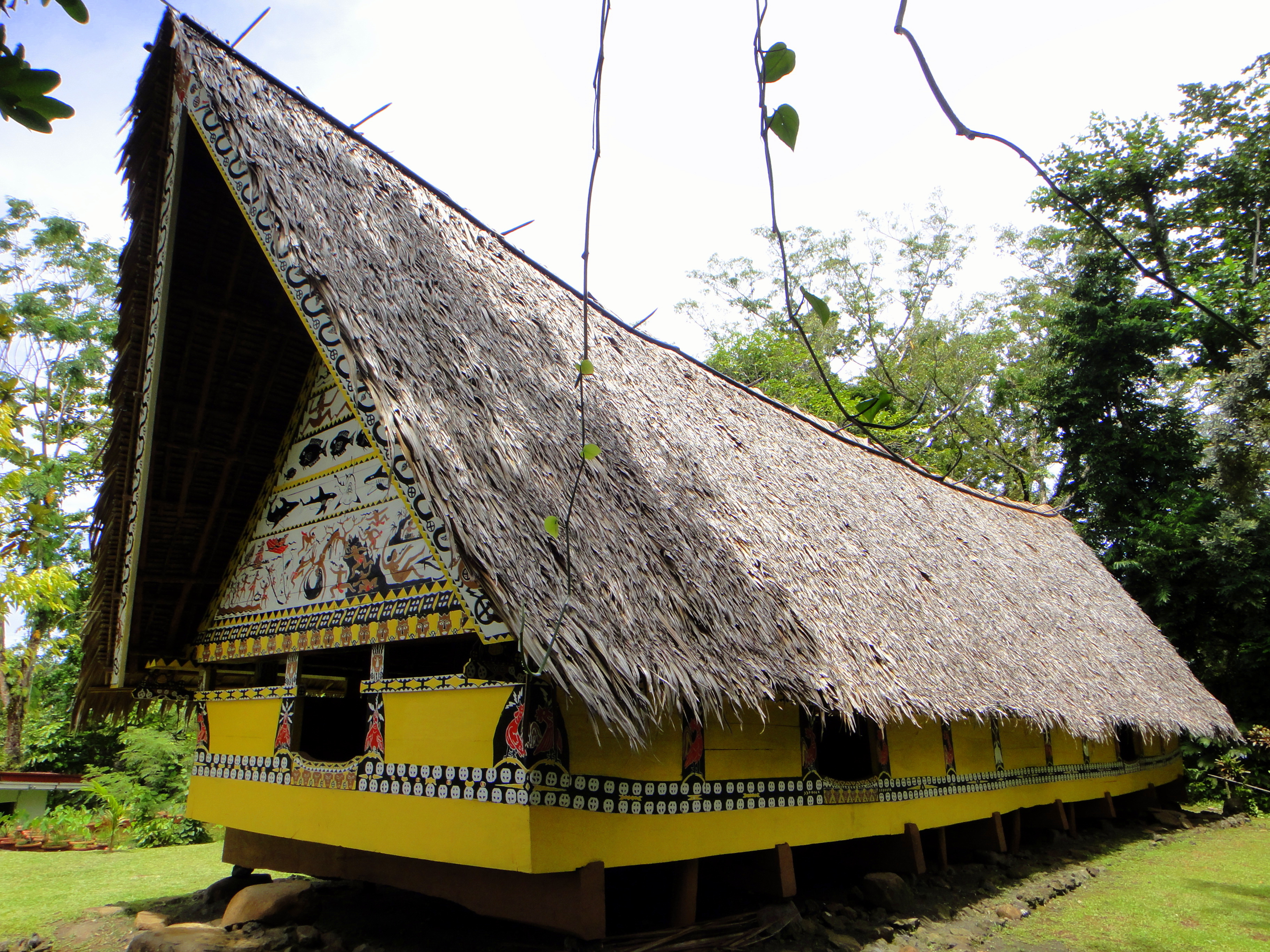
A bai in Belau National Museum, Koror

In Palau there is many traditional meeting houses known as bais or abais. In ancient times every village in Palau had a bai as it was the most important building in a village. At the beginning of the 20th century, more than 100 bais were still in existence in Palau. In bais governing elders are assigned seats along the walls, according to rank and title. A bai has no dividing walls or furnishing and is decorated with depictions of Palauan legends. Palau's oldest bai is Airai Bai which is over 100 years old. Bais feature on the Seal of Palau and the flag of Koror.

=== New Caledonia (Kanaky) ===
==== Kanak traditional architecture ====
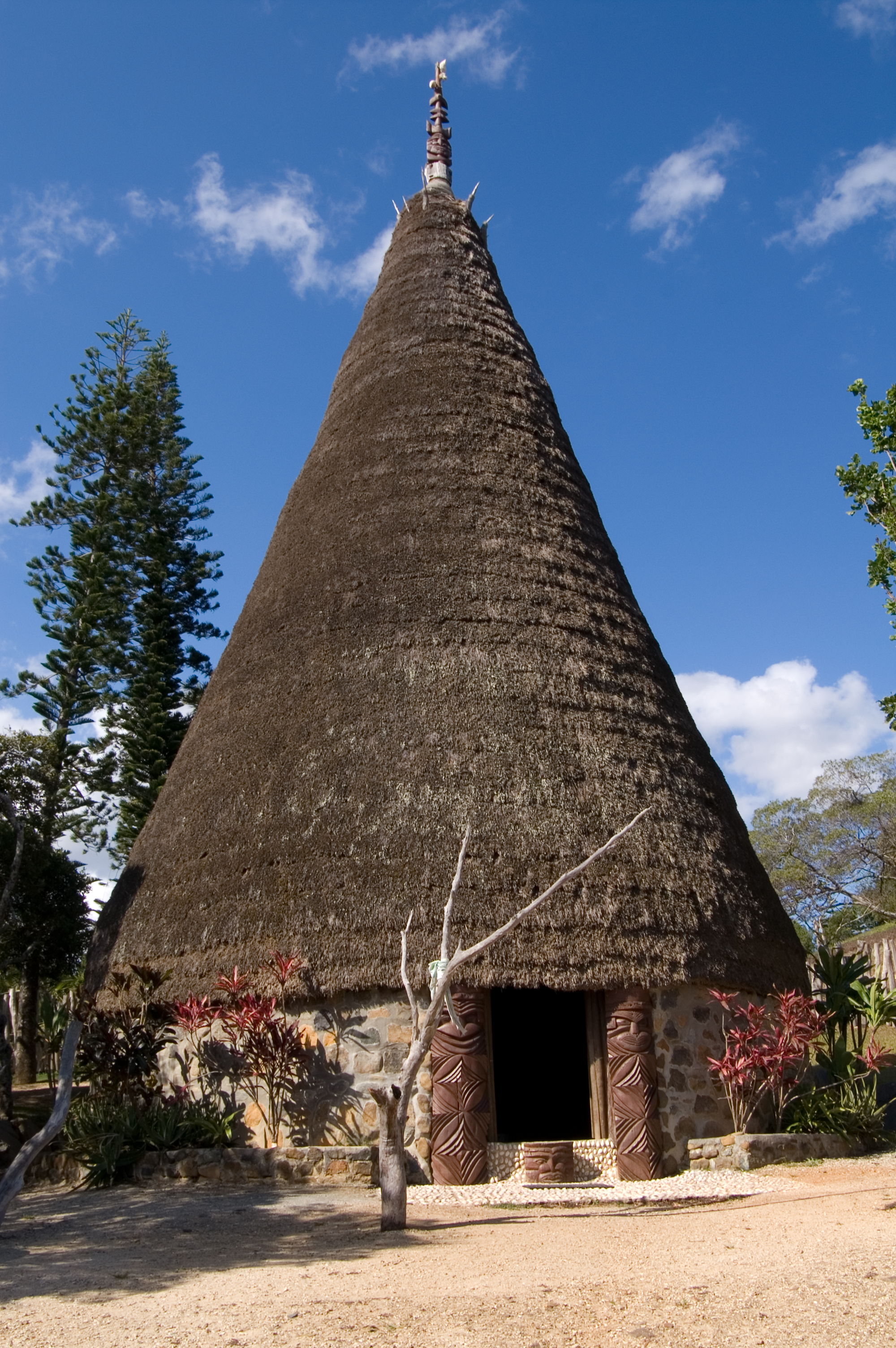
La Grande Case (Chief's Hut) at the Jean-Marie Tjibaou Cultural Centre, Nouméa, New Caledonia.

Kanak cultures developed in the New Caledonia archipelago over a period of three thousand years. Today, France governs New Caledonia but has not developed a national culture. The Kanak claim for independence is upheld by a culture thought of as national by the indigenous population. Kanaks have settled over all the islands officially indicated by France as New Caledonia and Dependencies. The archipelago includes the principal island, Grande Terre, Belep Islands to the north and Isle of Pines to the south. It is bordered on the east by the Loyalty Islands, consisting of three coral atolls (Mare, Lifou, and Ouvea).

==== Kanak contemporary architecture ====
Contemporary Kanak society has several layers of customary authority, from the 4,000–5,000 family-based clans to the eight customary areas (aires coutumières) that make up the territory. Clans are led by clan chiefs and constitute 341 tribes, each headed by a tribal chief. The tribes are further grouped into 57 customary chiefdoms (chefferies), each headed by a head chief, and forming the administrative subdivisions of the customary areas.

The Jean-Marie Tjibaou Cultural Centre (French: Centre Culturel Tjibaou) designed by Italian architect Renzo Piano and opened in 1998 is the icon of the Kanak culture and contemporary Kanak architecture.

=== Samoa ===
==== Traditional architecture (ethno-architecture) of Samoa ====
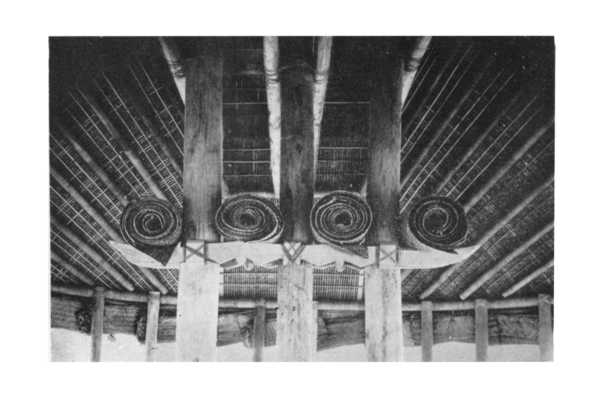
interior fale tele with central pillars and curved rafters

The architecture of Samoa is characterised by openness, with the design mirroring the culture and life of the Samoan people who inhabit the Samoa Islands. Architectural concepts are incorporated into Samoan proverbs, oratory and metaphors, as well as linking to other art forms in Samoa, such as boat building and tattooing. The spaces outside and inside of traditional Samoan architecture are part of cultural form, ceremony and ritual. Fale is the Samoan word for all types of houses, from small to large. In general, traditional Samoan architecture is characterized by an oval or circular shape, with wooden posts holding up a domed roof. There are no walls. The base of the architecture is a skeleton frame. Before European arrival and the availability of Western materials, a Samoan fale did not use any metal in its construction.

== Art ==
The artistic creations of these people varies greatly throughout the cultures and regions. The subject matter typically carries themes of fertility or the supernatural. Art such as masks were used in religious ceremonies or social rituals. Petroglyphs, Tattooing, painting, wood carving, stone carving and textile work are other common art forms. Contemporary Pacific art is alive and well, encompassing traditional styles, symbols, and materials, but now imagined in a diversity of contemporary forms, revealing the complexity of geographic, cultural and individual interaction and history.

== Music ==
- Music of Australasia
  - Music of Australia
  - Music of New Zealand
- Music of Melanesia
  - Music of Fiji
  - Music of Papua New Guinea
  - Music of Solomon Islands
  - Music of Vanuatu
- Music of Micronesia
  - Music of Kiribati
  - Music of Marshall Islands
  - Music of the Federated States of Micronesia
  - Music of Nauru
  - Music of Palau
- Music of Polynesia
  - Music of Samoa
  - Music of Tonga
  - Music of Tuvalu

== Languages ==
The branches of the Oceanic languages Admiralties and Yapese St Matthias Western Oceanic Temotu Southeast Solomons Southern Oceanic Micronesian Samoan-Polynesian

Native languages of Oceania fall into three major geographic groups:

- The large Austronesian language family, with such languages as Malay (Indonesian), Tagalog (Filipino), and Polynesian languages such as Māori and Hawaiian
- The various Aboriginal Australian language families, including the large Pama–Nyungan family
- The various Papuan language families of New Guinea and neighbouring islands, including the large Trans–New Guinea family

Contact between Austronesian and Papuan resulted in several instances in mixed languages such as Maisin.

Non-indigenous languages include:

- English in Australia, Hawaii, New Zealand, and other territories
- French in French Polynesia, New Caledonia, Vanuatu, and Wallis and Futuna
- Hindi in Fiji
- Japanese in Palau
- Spanish in Easter Island, Micronesia and Guam

There are also creoles formed from the interaction of Malay or the colonial languages with indigenous languages, such as Tok Pisin, Bislama, Pijin, various Malay trade and creole languages, Samoan Plantation Pidgin, Hawaiian Pidgin, Norfuk, Pitkern, and Unserdeutsch.

Finally, immigrants brought their own languages, such as Mandarin, Italian, Arabic, Cantonese, Greek and others in Australia, or Fiji Hindi in Fiji.

== See also ==
- Austronesian culture
- Culture of Africa
- Culture of Asia
- Culture of Europe
- Culture of North America
- Culture of South America
