= Airai Bai =

- Bai Ra Irrai
- U.S. National Register of Historic Places
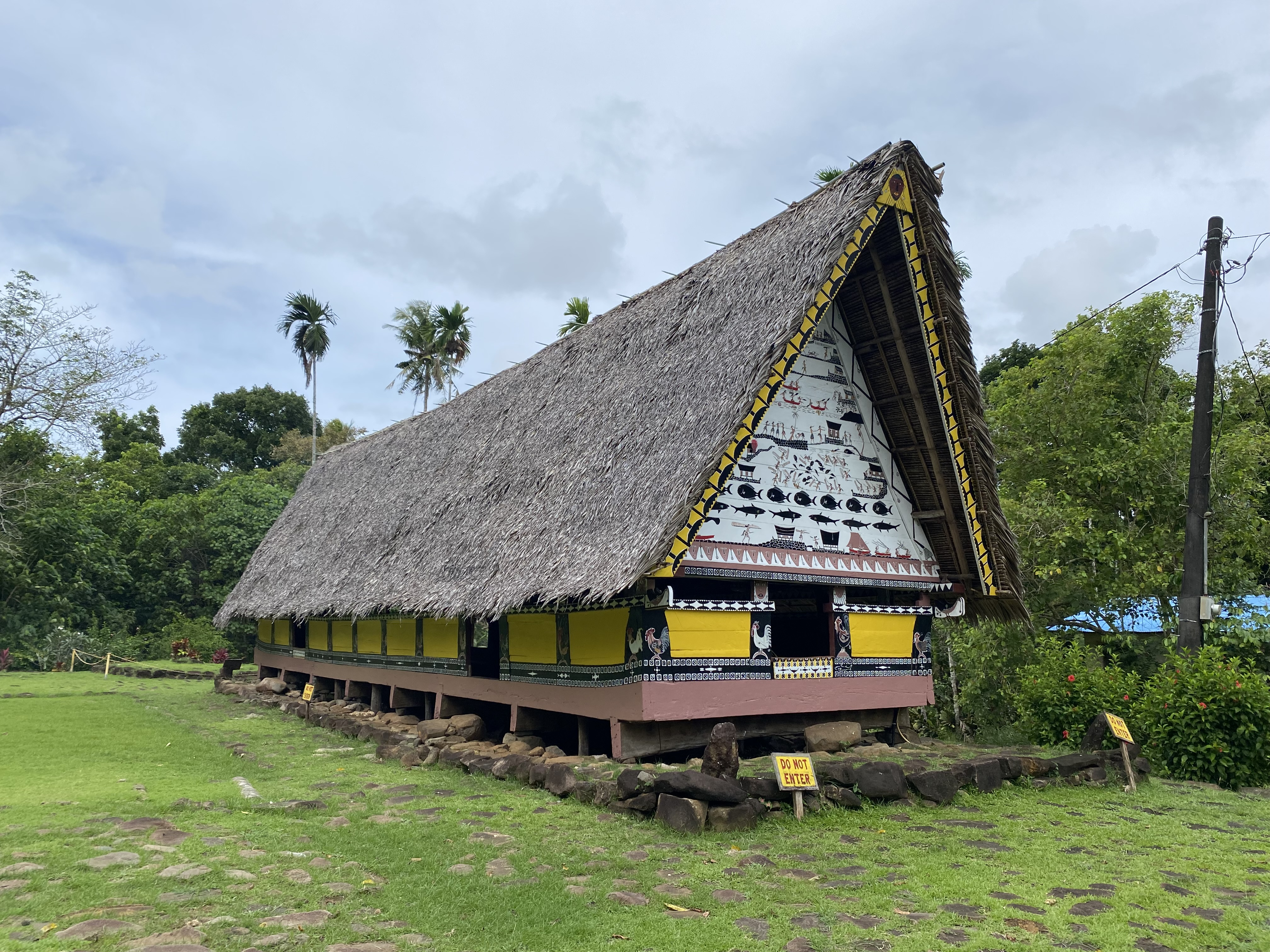

- Location within Palau
- Location: Airai, Babeldaob, Palau
- Coordinates: 7°21′40″N 134°33′37″E
- Area: 2 acres (0.81 ha)
- Built: 1890
- Architect: Multiple
- NRHP reference No.: 76002195
- Added to NRHP: September 20, 1976

The Airai Bai (Men's Meetinghouse of Airai) in Palauan is a traditional meetinghouse in the Airai municipality on Babeldaob, the largest island in the island nation of Palau. It is located in the center of the village on a stone platform that had previously held earlier bais, and is located at the junction of two traditional stone pathways. The building is 68 by 20 feet (20.7 m × 6.1 m), rising to a height of 40 feet (12 m) at its peak. Its facade and interior beams are decorated with depictions of Palauan legends. It was built around 1890, and underwent a major restoration in the 1970s. The building and site have long been the spiritual and civic centerpiece of the community.

The building was listed on the United States National Register of Historic Places (as "Bai Ra Irrai") in 1976, a time when Palau was part of the United States Trust Territories of the Pacific.
