= List of protected areas of Samoa =

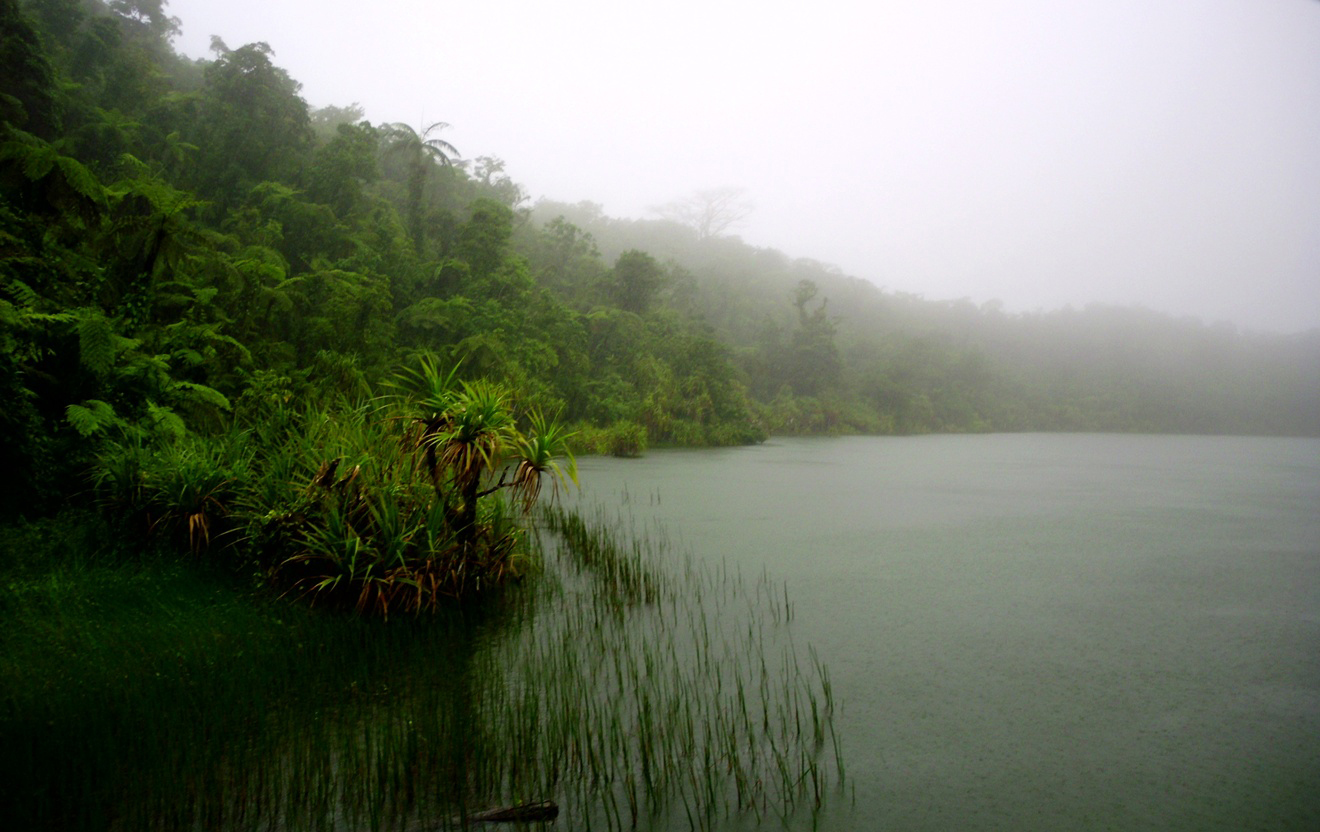
Upolu Island, Samoa

This is a list of some protected areas of Samoa which include national parks, reserves, community conservation areas, marine protected areas and fish reserves and other areas of significant biodiversity and conservation.

In 1994, Samoa ratified the international and legally binding treaty, the Convention on Biological Diversity to develop national strategies for conservation and sustainable use of biological diversity. In 2010, protected areas in the country cover 5% of land although the government aims to increase protected areas coverage to 15%.

== Protected Areas ==
=== Community Conservation Areas ===
- Aleipata Islands
- Aleipata Marine Protected Area
- Central Savai'i Rainforest, largest patch of continuous rainforest in Polynesia
- Fagaloa Bay – Uafato Tiavea Conservation Zone
- Falealupo, rainforest reserve, created by village covenant
- Safata Marine Protected Area
- Tafua, rainforest reserve, created village covenant
- Saanapu Mangrove Conservation Area

=== National Parks ===
- Lake Lanoto'o National Park
- Lata National Park
- Masamasa-Falelima National Park / Cornwall National Park
- Mauga o Salafai National Park
- O Le Pupū Pu’e National Park

=== Reserves ===
- Vailele Reserve, also known as 'Ao o le Malo Reserve
- Eleele Fou Reserve also known as Apia Central Recreational Reserve
- Fa'avaeileatua Reserve
- Faleaa Nature Reserve also known as Fuluasou Botanical Garden
- Magiagi Reserve
- Palolo Deep Marine Reserve
- Taumeasina Reserve
- Robert Louis Stevenson Memorial Reserve
- Mt. Vaea National Reserve known as Mt Vaea Scenic Reserve
- Vaigaga Reserve
- Vaimoso Reserve
- Vaitele East Reserve
- Vaitele West Reserve
- Vaitele Fou Reserve
- Malololelei Recreation Reserve

== See also ==
- Samoan plant names
- List of birds of Samoa
- List of mammals of Samoa
