= List of Samoan plant common names =

Below are some Samoan plant names in alphabetical order in the Samoan language and their corresponding descriptions in English. Many are used in traditional medicines in the Samoa Islands comprising Samoa and American Samoa.

Samoan name	Scientific name	Plant family	English name
A'atasi	Rorippa sarmentosa	Brassicaceae (Mustard family)	Polynesian cress, longrunner
Ago, lega when cooked	Curcuma longa	Zingiberaceae (Ginger family)	Turmeric
Aloalo, also Aloalo fanua, Aloalo sami	Premna serratifolia	Verbenaceae (Verbena family)	
Aloalo tai	Volkameria inermis	Verbenaceae (Verbena family)	glory bower
Aloalo vao	Mussaenda raiateensis	Rubiaceae (Coffee family)	Pacific mussaenda, Pacific flag-tree
Aloe (English loan word)	Aloe vera	Agavaceae (Yucca family)	Aloe vera
Aoa	Ficus obliqua	Moraceae (Mulberry family)	Polynesian banyan, strangler fig
ʻApu Initia (English loan word)	Anacardium occidentale	Anacardiaceae (Cashew family)	Cashew, "Indian Apple"
Ateate	Wollastonia biflora	Asteraceae (Sunflower family)	Beach sunflower
ʻAu'auli	Diospyros samoensis	Ebenaceae	Samoan ebony
ʻAute Samoa	Hibiscus rosa-sinensis	Malvaceae (Mallow family)	Red hibiscus
ʻAva, ʻAva Samoa, kava	Piper methysticum	Piperaceae (Pepper family)	Kava
ʻAvaʻavaaitu	Macropiper puberulum	Piperaceae (Pepper family)	hairy piper
ʻAvaʻavaaitu sosolo			
ʻAvaʻavaaitu tu			
ʻAvapui	Zingiber zerumbet	Zingiberaceae (Ginger family)	Wild ginger, shampoo ginger
ʻAvapui tuasivi	Alpinia samoensis	Zingiberaceae	Samoan shell-ginger
Esi (Tongan loan word, lesi transliterated as le esi	Carica papaya	Caricaceae (Papaya family)	Papaya, pawpaw
Faʻi, moʻe, futi	Musa maclayi	Musaceae (Banana family)	Banana, plantain
Fala	Pandanus tectorius	Pandanaceae (Screwpine family)	Pandanus, screwpine
Fau	Hibiscus tiliaceus	Malvaceae (Mallow family)	Beach hibiscus
Fetau	Calophyllum inophyllum	Clusiaceae (Maongosteen family)	Calophyllum
Filimoto	Flacourtia rukam	Flacourtiaceae (Flacourtia family)	Indian plum
Fisoa	Colubrina asiatica	Rhamnaceae (Buckthorn family)	latherleaf, Asian nakedwood, Asian snakewood
Fiu	Zingiber officinale	Zingiberaceae (Ginger family)	Ginger
Fu'afu'a	Kleinhovia hospita	Sterculiaceae (Cacao family)	guest tree
Fue laufao	Epipremnum pinnatum	Araceae (arum family)	centipede tongavine, dragon-tail plant
Fue manogi	Piper graeffei	Piperaceae (Piper family)	
Fue moa, Fuefue moa	Ipomoea pes-caprae	Convolvulaceae (Morning-glory family)	Beach morning-glory
Fue saina	Mikania micrantha	Asteraceae (Sunflower family)	Mile-a-minute weed, "Chinese Fue"
Fue sina	Vigna marina	Fabaceae (Pea family)	Beach pea
Futu	Barringtonia asiatica	Barringtonia (Barringtonia family)	Fish-poison tree
Gatae, Gatae Samoa	Erythrina variegata	Fabaceae (Pea family)	Coral tree
Ifi	Inocarpus fagifer	Fabaceae (Pea family)	Tahitian chestnut
Ifiifi	Atuna excelsa subsp. racemosa, syn. Atuna racemosa	Chrysobalanaceae	tabon-tabon
Ifilele	Intsia bijuga	Fabaceae (Pea family)	Fijian vesi, Tongan fehi
Kuava (English loan word)	Psidium guajava	Myrtaceae (Myrtle family)	Guava
La'au fai lafa	Senna alata	Fabaceae (Pea family)	Dandlebush, acapulco
Laga'ali	Aglaia samoensis	Meliaceae (Mahogany family)	
Lama, tuitui	Aleurites moluccanus	Euphorbiaceae (Spurge family)	Candlenut (lama means "soot")
Lau mafiafia	Hoya australis	Asclepiadaceae (Milkweed family)	Wax plant
Lau pata, Lau papata, Pata	Macaranga harveyana	Euphorbiaceae (Spurge family)	
Lau ti, Ti	Cordyline fruticosa	Euphorbiaceae (Spurge family)	Ti leaf
Leva	Cerbera manghas	Apocynaceae (Dogbane family)	sea mango
Ma'anunu	Tarenna sambucina	Rubiaceae (Coffee family)	
Magele	Trema cannabina	Ulmaceae (Elm family)	poison peach
Mago	Mangifera indica	Anacardiaceae (Cashew family)	mango
Makerita (English loan word)	Tagetes erecta	Asteraceae (Sunflower family)	African marigold
Mamala	Omalanthus nutans	Euphorbiaceae (Spurge family)	Mamala extract found to be medicinally useful as antiviral therapy
Masame	Glochidion ramiflorum	Euphorbiaceae (Spurge family)	
Matalafi	Psychotria insularum	Rubiaceae (Coffee family)	
Mati	Ficus tinctoria	Moraceae (Mulberry family)	Dyer's fig
Mautofu	Sida rhombifolia	Malvaceae (Mallow family)	Broom weed
Mau'utoga ("Tongan mau'u")	Commelina diffusa	Commelinaceae (Spiderwort family)	Day flower
Milo	Thespesia populnea	Malvaceae (Mallow family)	Milo, Pacific rosewood
Moegalo	Cymbopogon citratus	Poaceae (Grass family)	Lemon grass
Moli'aina ("edible moli")	Citrus sinensis	Rutaceae (Citrus family)	Orange, sweet orange
Moso'oi	Cananga odorata	Annonaceae (Soursop family)	Perfume tree, ylang-ylang
Namulega	Vitex trifolia	Verbenaceae (Verbena family)	simpleleaf chastetree
Niu (Young drinking coconut), Popo(Mature Coconut)	Cocos nucifera	Arecaceae (Palm family)	Coconut
Nonu, Nonu togianonu	Morinda citrifolia	Rubiaceae (Coffee family)	Indian mulberry, "noni"
Nonu 'ai ("edible nonu"), Nonu fi'afi'a	Syzygium malaccense	Myrtaceae (Myrtle family)	Malay apple
ʻOʻa	Bischofia javanica	Euphorbiaceae (Spurge family)	bishop wood
ʻOfe, Ofe Samoa	Schizostachyum glaucifolium	Poaceae (Grass family)	Polynesian bamboo
Ogoogo, Ogoogo toto	Laportea interrupta	Urticaceae (Nettle family)	Island nettle
Ogoogo tea, Ogoogo sina, Ogoogo pa'epa'e (all mean "white ogoogo")	Acalypha lanceolata	Euphorbiaceae (Spurge family)	
Pate	Coleus scutellarioides	Lamiaceae (Mint family)	Coleus
Polo feu ("spicy polo")	Capsicum frutescens	Solanaceae (Nightshade family)	Chilli pepper
Poumuli	Securinega flexuosa	Phyllanthaceae	
Pua Fiti ("Fijian pua")	Plumeria rubra	Apocynaceae (Dogbane family)	Plumeria, frangipani
Pua Samoa, Tiale	Gardenia taitensis	Rubiaceae (Coffee family)	Tahitian gardenia (tiare)
Pua taunofo	Allamanda cathartica	Apocynaceae (Dogbane family)	Golden trumpet
Salato	Dendrocnide harveyi	Urticaceae (Nettle family)	Stinging nettle tree
Seasea	Syzygium corynocarpum	Myrtaceae (Myrtle family)	hemp-agrimony, holy rope
Soi	Dioscorea bulbifera	Dioscoreaceae (Yam family)	Bitter yam
Tagitagi, Tagitagi Samoa	Polyscias fruticosa	Araliaceae (Panax family)	Ming aralia
Taipoipoi	Geniostoma ligustrifolium	Loganiaceae (Logania family)	hangehange
Talafalu	Micromelum minutum	Rutaceae (Citrus family)	limeberry, samui
Talie	Terminalia catappa	Combretaceae (Tropical Island family)	Tropical almond
Talo	Colocasia esculenta	Araceae (Arum family)	Taro
Teuila	Alpinia purpurata	Zingiberaceae (Ginger family)	Red ginger. (national flower of Samoa)
Teve	Amorphophallus paeoniifolius	Araceae (arum family)	elephant foot yam, whitespot giant arum
Tipolo (Tahitian loan word)	Citrus medica	Rutaceae (Citrus family)	Citron, lemon
Togo, Togotogo	Centella asiatica	Apiaceae (Carrot family)	Asiatic pennywort
Tolo	Saccharum officinarum	Poaceae (Grass family)	Sugarcane
U'a	Broussonetia papyrifera	Moraceae (Mulberry family)	Paper mulberry, used in making tapa
Ufi	Boerhavia repens	Nyctaginaceae (Four O'Clock family)	Yam
ʻUlu	Artocarpus altilis	Moraceae (Mulberry family)	Breadfruit tree
ʻUmala	Ipomoea batatas	Ipomoea (Sweet Potato)	Sweet potato, kumara
Usi	Euodia hortensis	Rutaceae (Citrus family)	Island musk
Vao apulupulu	Chamaesyce hirta	Euphorbiaceae (Spurge family)	Garden spurge
Vao vai	Peperomia pellucida	Piperaceae (Pepper family)	pepper elder, shining bush plant, man to man
Vavae	Ceiba pentandra	Malvaceae (Mallow family)	Kapok
Vi	Spondias dulcis	Anacardiaceae (Cashew family)	Polynesian plum, Otaheite apple
Vi vao	Physalis angulata	Solanaceae (Nightshade family)	Wild cape gooseberry

== See also ==
- List of protected areas of Samoa
- National Park of American Samoa
- Central Savai'i Rainforest, largest continuous patch of rainforest in Polynesia
- List of birds of Samoa
- List of mammals of Samoa
- IUCN Red List of Threatened Species
- Domesticated plants and animals of Austronesia
