= National Park of American Samoa =

United States national park in American Samoa

- IUCN category V (protected landscape/seascape)
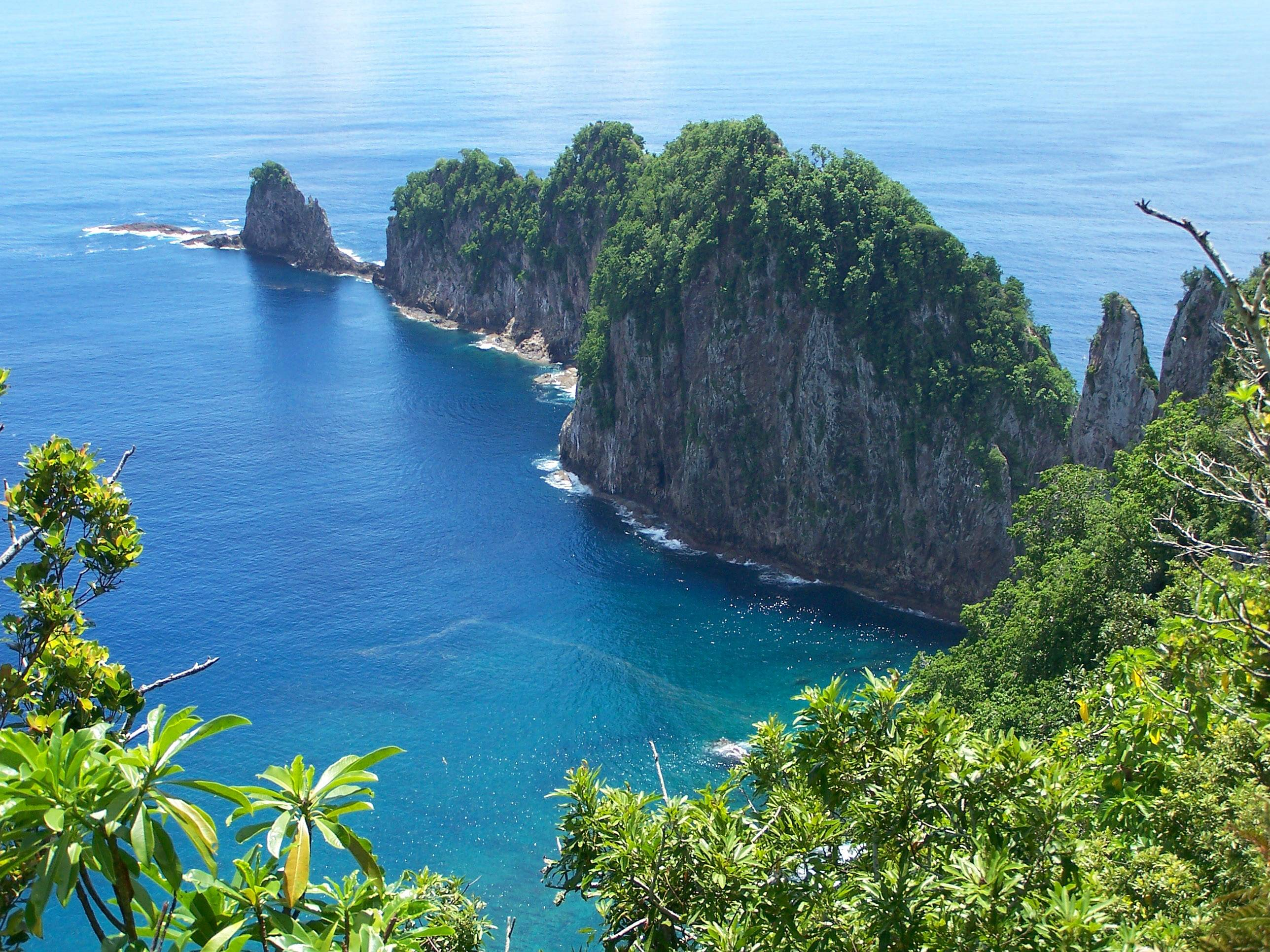
- Pola Island on Tutuila

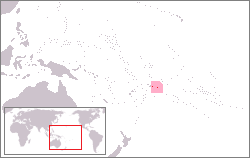
- Interactive map of National Park of American Samoa
- Location: American Samoa, United States
- Nearest city: Pago Pago
- Coordinates: 14°15′30″S 170°41′00″W
- Area: 8,256.67 acres (33.4136 km^{2})
- Established: October 31, 1988; 37 years ago
- Visitors: 12,135 (in 2022)
- Governing body: National Park Service
- Website: nps.gov/npsa

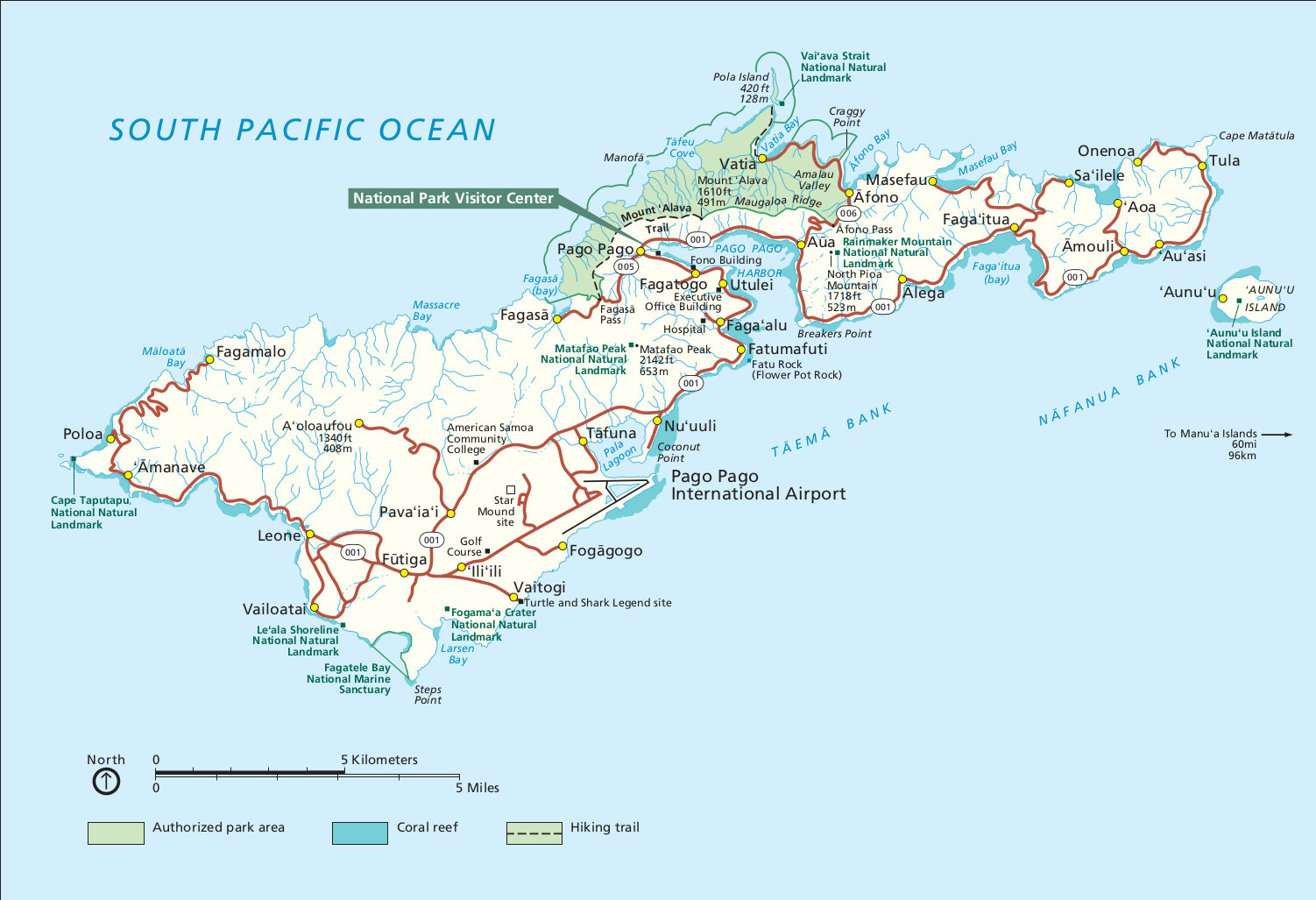
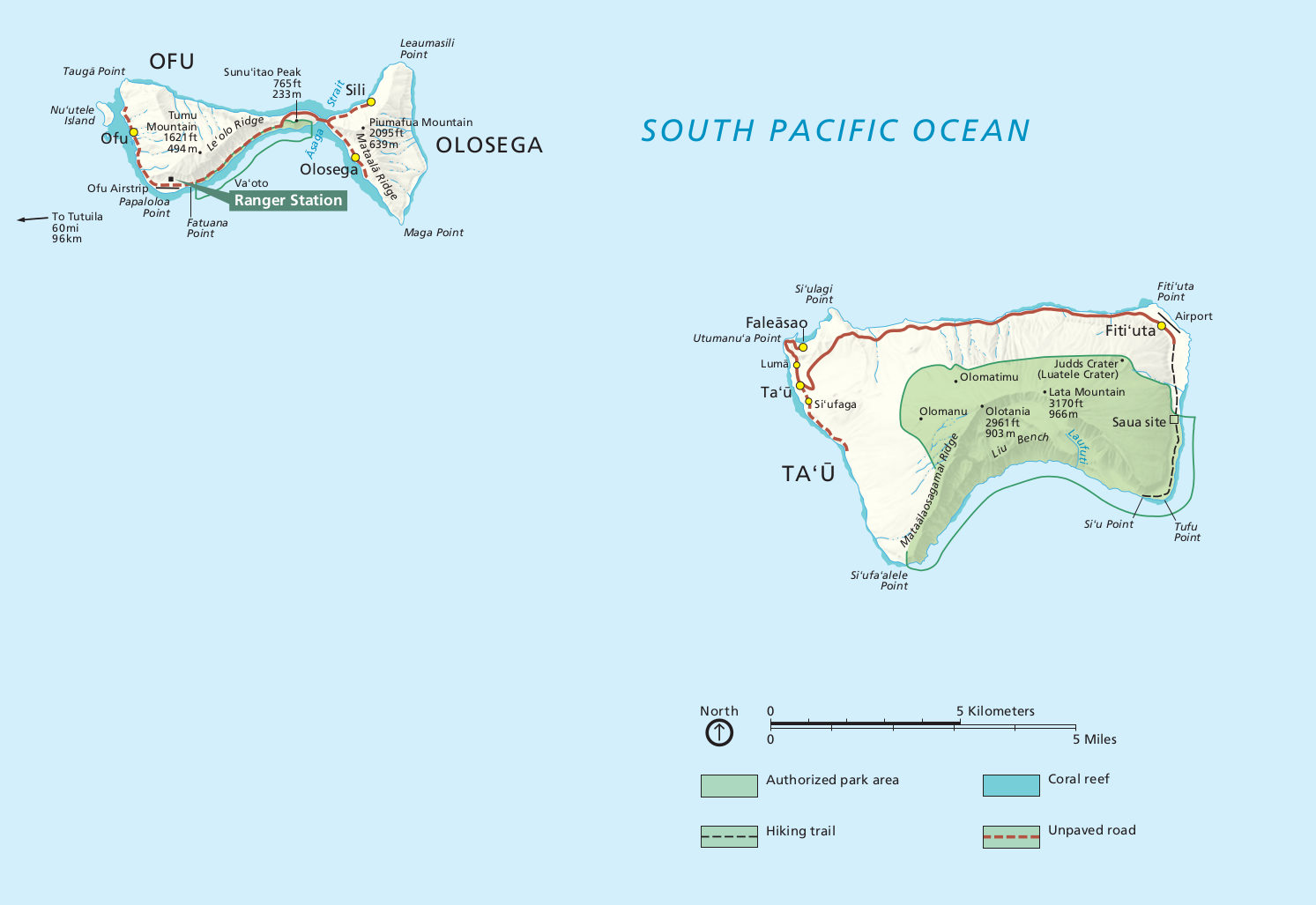
Location of the park on Tutuila (left), Ofu, and Taʻū (right)

The National Park of American Samoa (Pāka Faʻasao o Amerika Sāmoa) is a national park of the United States located in the territory of American Samoa, distributed across three islands: Tutuila, Ofu, and Taʻū. The park preserves and protects coral reefs, tropical rainforests, fruit bats, and the Samoan culture. Popular activities include hiking and snorkeling. Of the park's 8,257 acres (3,341 ha), 2,500 acres (1,000 ha) is coral reefs and ocean.

The park is the only American National Park Service system unit south of the equator. The national park encompasses the ridgeline and steep northern slopes of Tutuila, the beach and coral reef at the Toʻaga site on Ofu’s southeast coast, and nearly two-thirds of Taʻū Island.

== History ==
Delegate Fofō Iosefa Fiti Sunia introduced a bill in 1984, at the request from Bat Preservers Association and Dr. Paul Cox, to include American Samoa in the Federal Fish and Wildlife Restoration Act. The purpose of the bill was to protect the habitat for the flying fox as well as to protect the old rainforest. The bill marked the beginning of American Samoa's entry into the U.S. National Park System. The National Park Service began the work of establishing the national park in July 1987.

The National Park of American Samoa was established on October 31, 1988, by Public Law 100-571 but the NPS could not buy the land because of traditional communal land system. This was resolved on September 10, 1993, when the National Park Service entered into a 50-year lease for the park land from the Samoan village councils. In 2002, Congress approved a thirty percent expansion on Olosega and Ofu islands.

In September 2009 an earthquake and tsunami produced several large waves, resulting in 34 confirmed deaths, more than a hundred injuries and the destruction of about 200 homes and businesses. The park encountered major damage. The visitor center and main office were destroyed but there was only one reported injury among the NPS staff and volunteers.

== Tutuila ==
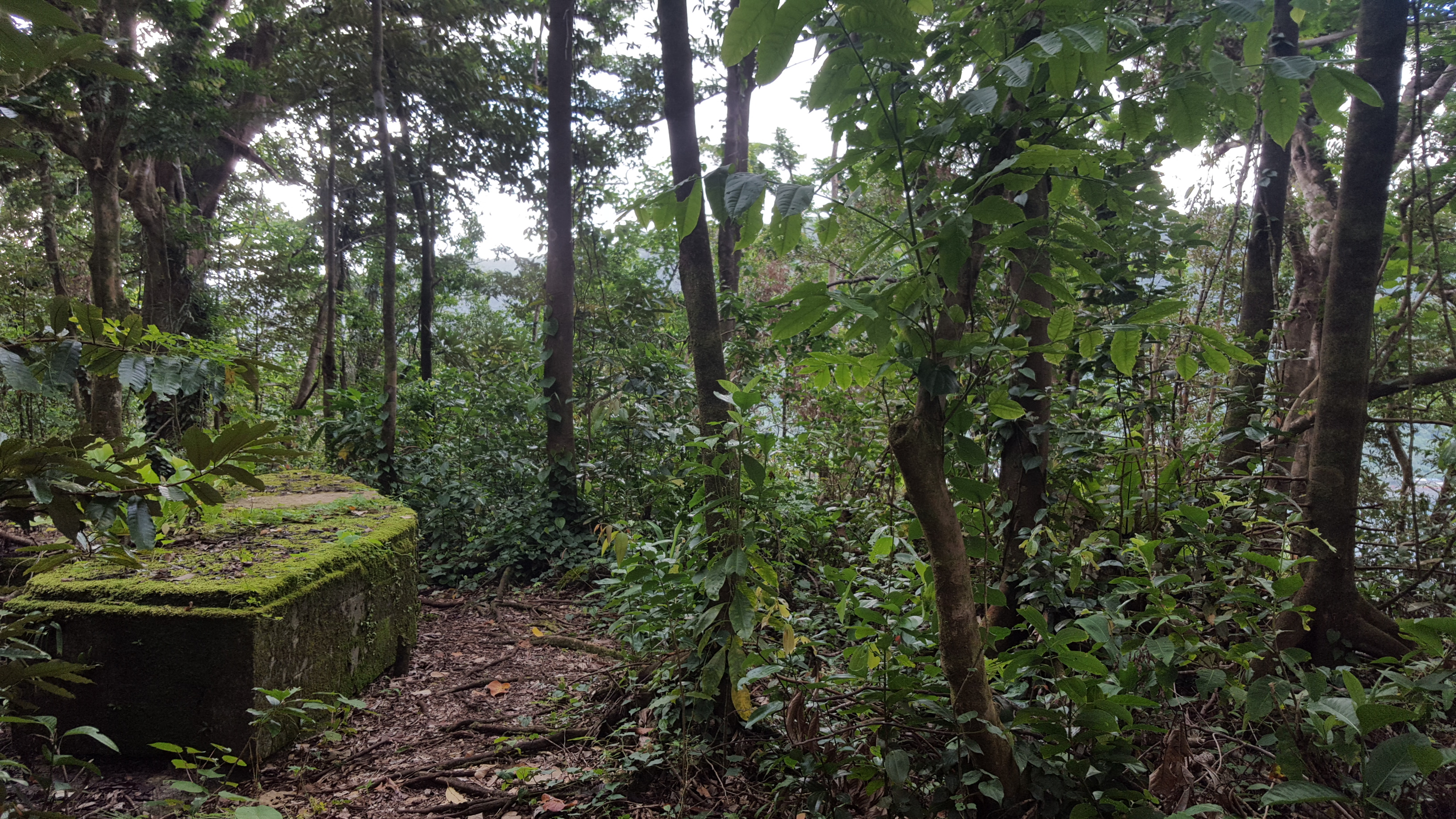
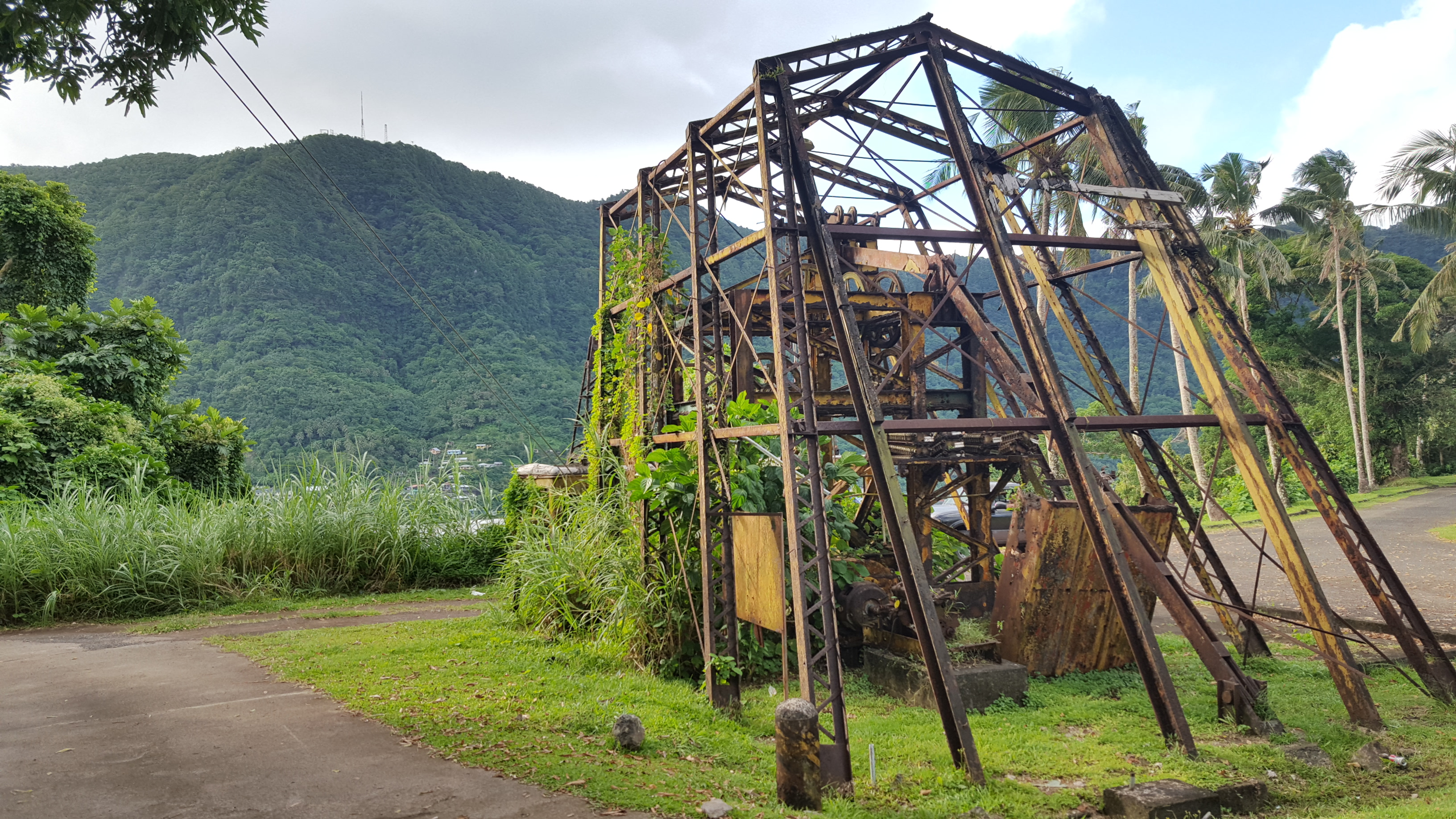
Remains of a World War II encampment and the historic tramway on the World War II Heritage Trail

The Tutuila unit of the park is on the north end of the island near Pago Pago. It is separated by Mount Alava (1,610 feet (490 m)) and the Maugaloa Ridge and includes the Amalau Valley, Craggy Point, Tāfeu Cove, and the islands of Pola and Manofā. It consists of 2,500 acres of land (3.9 square miles) and 1,200 acres of offshore waters.

It is the only part of the park accessible by car and attracts the vast majority of visitors to the area. The park lands include a trail to the top of Mount Alava and historic World War II gun emplacement sites at Breakers Point and Blunts Point. The trail runs along the ridge in dense forest, north of which the land slopes steeply away to the ocean.

== Manuʻa Islands ==
=== Ofu ===
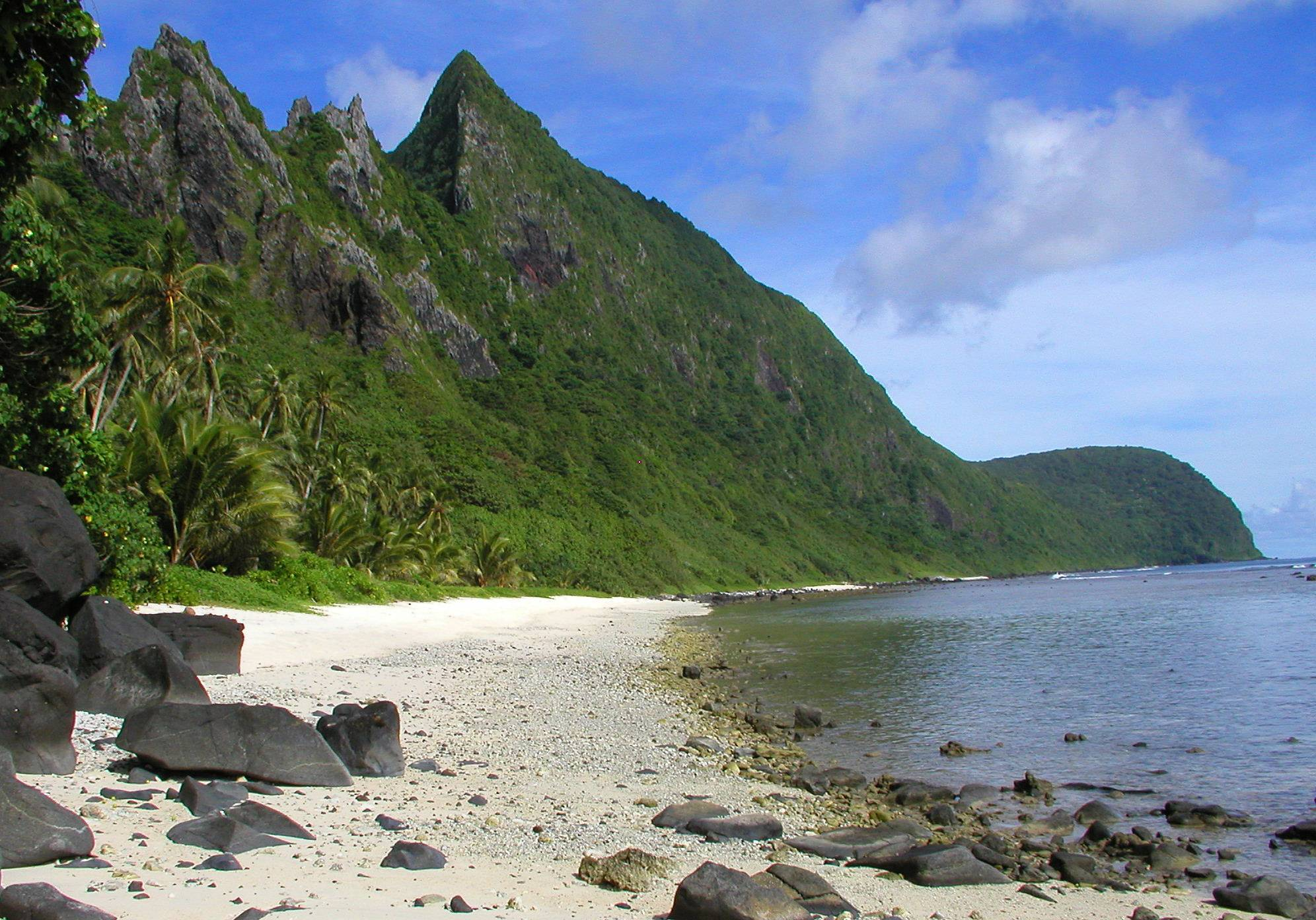
Ofu Beach

Consisting of the two-mile Ofu Beach and Sunuitao Peak, the Ofu unit is the smallest of the three park units (70 acres of land, 400 acres of offshore waters), although most of the visitors who have been there consider it the most attractive. Ofu island is accessible via small fisherman boats from Taʻū island, which are not very reliable transportation, and from biweekly flights from Pago Pago. Accommodations are available on Ofu.

=== Taʻū ===
With 3,700 acres (21 square kilometers, 8.3 square miles) of land and 1,100 acres of offshore waters, the Taʻū unit is the largest and the most wild of the three park units, and also include the highest point in American Samoa, Lata Mountain 3,170-foot (970 m). Taʻū island can be reached by a flight from Tutuila to Fiti‘uta village on Taʻū. Accommodations are available on Taʻū. A trail runs from Saua around Siʻu Point to the southern coastline. There used to be a trail to the 3,170-foot (970 m) summit of Lata Mountain, but it has become overgrown and impassable without machete work. There is a report that the National Park Service plans to rebuild the trail starting in June 2024.

== Biodiversity ==
Because of its remote location, diversity among the terrestrial species is low. Approximately 30% of the plants and one bird species (the Samoan starling) are endemic to the archipelago.

=== Fauna ===
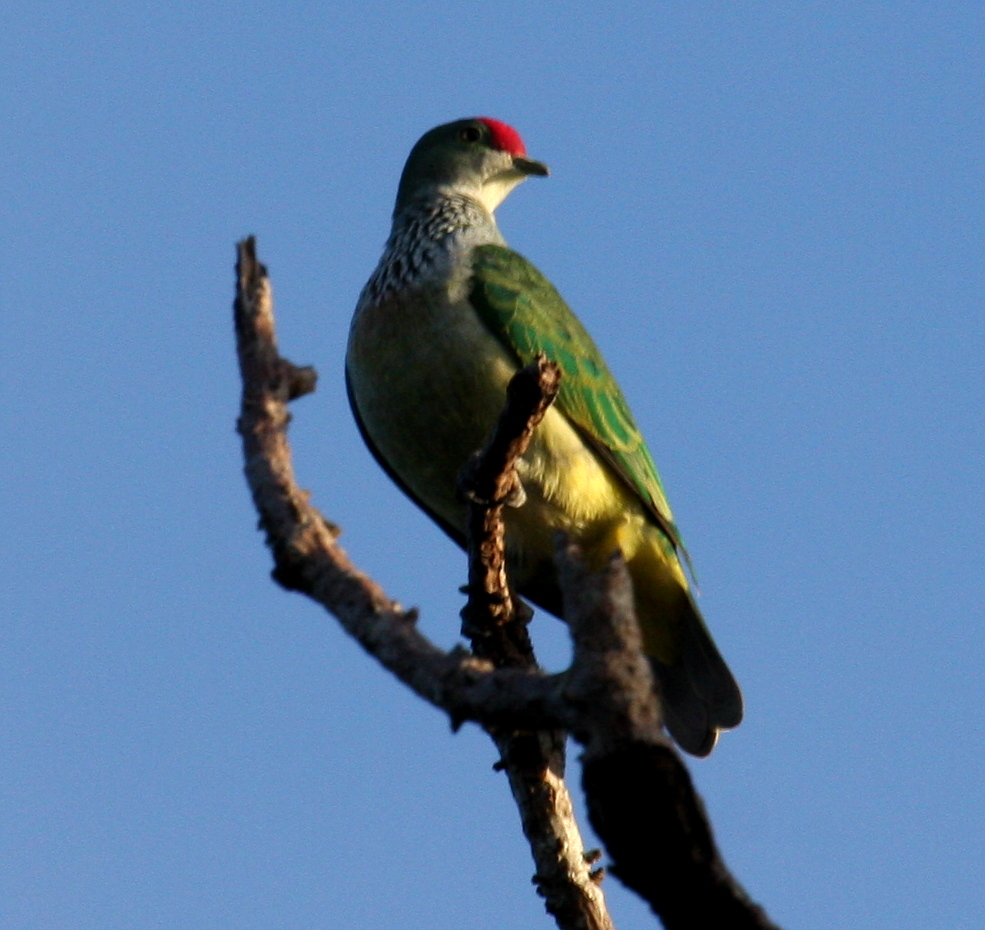
The many-colored fruit dove has been found in the park.

Three species of bat are the only native mammals: two large fruit bats (Samoa flying fox and white-naped flying fox) and a small insectivore, the Pacific sheath-tailed bat. They serve an important role in pollinating the island's plants. The sheath-tailed bat was nearly eliminated by Cyclone Val in 1991 and possibly became locally extinct some time afterwards. Four reptiles are known to be native to the island: the Oceania gecko, and three species of skinks (mottled snake-eyed skink (Cryptoblepharus poecilopleurus), Micronesian skink (Emoia adspersa), and olive small-scaled skink (Emoia lawesii)). Additionally, there are 8 reptiles introduced with Polynesian settlement: five skink species (copper-tailed skink (Emoia cyanura), azure-tailed skink (Emoia impar), black emo skink (Emoia nigra), Samoa skink (Emoia samoensis), and moth skink (Ornithuroscincus noctua)), two gecko species (Pacific slender-toed gecko (Nactus pelagicus) and mourning gecko) and the Pacific boa (currently only found on Taʻū).

There are three reptiles introduced in the modern (post 18th century) era: stump-toed gecko, common house gecko, and the Brahminy blind snake (only on Tutuila).

Among mammals, Polynesian rats, pigs, and dogs are Polynesian introductions, while cats, black rats, brown rats, and house mouses are modern introductions. Also, the only known amphibian on the island, the cane toad is also a modern introduction, but is only found on Tutuila.

There are several bird species, the most predominant being the wattled honeyeater, Samoan starling, and Pacific pigeon. Other unusual birds include the Tahiti petrel, the spotless crake, and the rare (in this locality) many-colored fruit dove.

A major role for the park is to control and eradicate invasive plant and animal species such as feral pigs, which threaten the park's ecosystem.

=== Flora ===
The islands are mostly covered by tropical rainforest, including cloud forest on Taʻū and lowland ridge forest on Tutuila. Most plants arrived by chance from Southeast Asia. There are 343 flowering plants, 135 ferns and about 30% are endemic plant species.

=== Marine ===
The surrounding waters are filled with a diversity of marine life, including sea turtles, humpback whales, over 950 species of fish, and over 250 coral species. Some of the largest living coral colonies (Porites) in the world are at Taʻū island.

== Geology ==
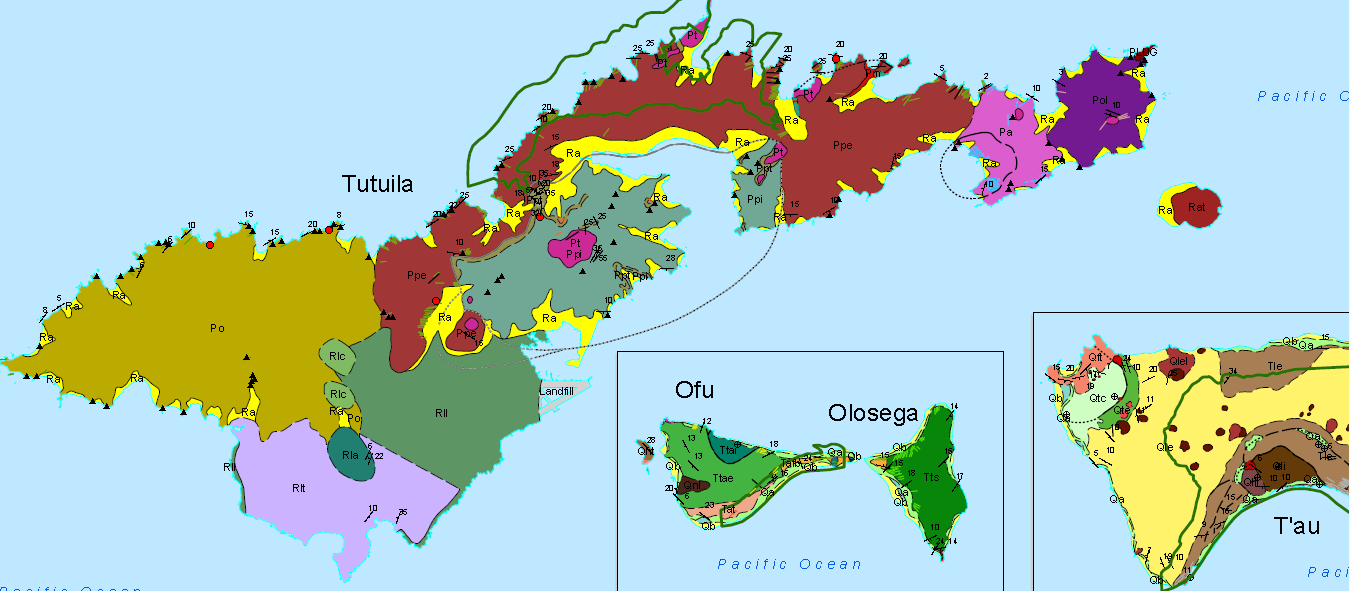
Samoan geological map with volcanic series labeled (click on image to enlarge)

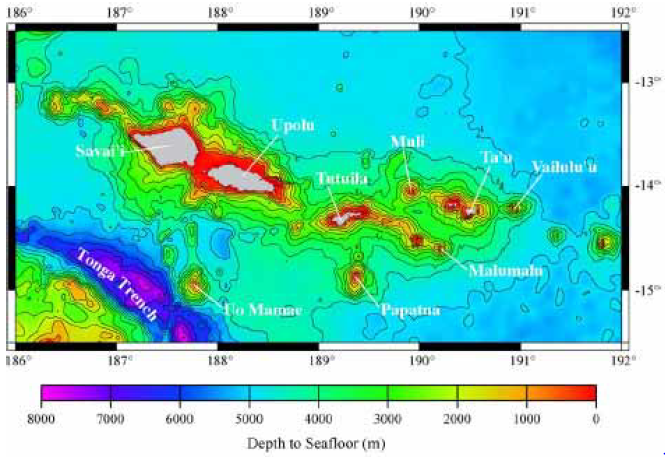
Samoan bathymetry

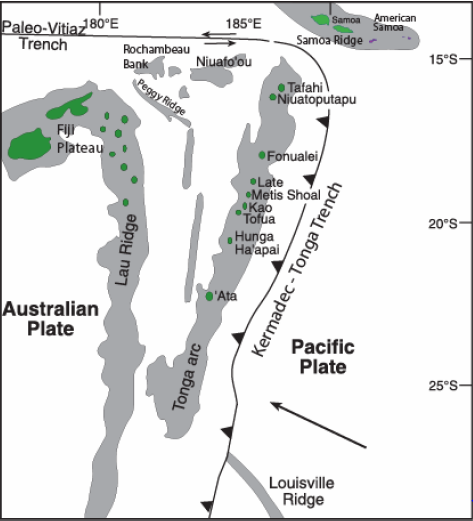
Samoan tectonic setting

The volcanic islands of Samoa that dominate the acreage of the national park are composed of shield volcanoes which developed from a hot spot on the Pacific Plate, emerging sequentially from west to east. Tutulia, the largest and oldest island, probably dates from the Pliocene Epoch, approximately 1.24 to 1.4 million years ago, while the smaller islands are most likely Holocene in age.

The islands are not made up of individual volcanoes, but are rather composed of overlapping and superimposed shield volcanoes built by basalt lava flows. Much of the lava that erupted has since broken into angular fragments known as breccia. The volcanoes emerged from the intrusion of basaltic dikes from a rift zone on the ocean floor during the Pliocene Epoch, and were heavily eroded during the Pliocene and early Pleistocene Epochs, leaving behind trachyte plugs and exposed outcrops of volcanic tuff throughout the park. Taʻū island, the youngest of the islands included within the national park, is all that remains from the collapse of a shield volcano during Holocene time. This collapse produced sea cliffs over 3,000 feet high on the north side of the island, some of the highest such escarpments in the world.

While the Samoan islands have not shown evidence of volcanism for many years, the Samoa hotspot beneath the islands continues to give indications of activity, with a submarine eruption detected just east of American Samoa in 1973. The Vailulu'u Seamount, located east of Taʻū, is a future Samoan island developing from submarine lava flows, continuing the eastward progress of volcanic development from the hotspot below the islands. The lava flows forming the seamount have been dated by radiometric methods to between 5 and 50 years, during which time the seamount has risen 14,764 feet from the ocean floor.

Evidence exists of past submarine and surface landslides as a result of weathering and other forms of erosion of the rocks and soil making up the islands. On Taʻū island, an inland escarpment known as Liu Bench (a feature of mass wasting) threatens to slump into the nearby ocean, an event which could produce a tsunami strong enough to bring devastation to the islands of Fiji to the southeast.

Olivine basalts were extruded from a N. 70° E. trending rift zone, oriented along the current Afono and Masefay bays of Tutuila, in the Pliocene or earliest Pleistocene. The Masefau dike complex and talus breccias are remnants of this rifting. Development of the Taputapu, Pago, Alofau, and Olomoana shield domes followed long parallel fissures followed, but when the Pago and Alofau summits collapsed, calderas were formed. Thick tuffs were deposited in the Pago caldera, and the southern rim was buried by lavas composed of picritic basalts, andesites, and trachytes. Subsequent erosion in Early to Middle Pleistocene enlarged the calderas, the Pago River in particular carved a deep canyon, the forerunner of today's Pago Pago Bay. A submarine shelf formed from the erosional runoff, allowing for the development of coral reefs before the island was submerged 600 feet (180 m) to 2,000 feet (610 m). Sea level fluctuations continued in the Middle to Late Pleistocene. A barrier reef formed, was submerged 200 feet (61 m), before emerging 50 feet (15 m), leaving sea caves above sea level. Leone volcanics erupted in recent time generating tuff cones undersea, such as Aunuu Island, and cinder cones on land. The pahoehoe flows buried the submerged barrier reef, enlarging the island by 8 square miles (21 km^{2}). The island has since emerged another 5 feet (1.5 m).

Ofu and Olosega are the remains of a single basaltic volcano, 4 miles (6.4 km) north to south and 6 miles (9.7 km) east to west, which formed in the Pliocene to Early Pleistocene. Remnants of one half of the caldera, ponded flows, form the north center portion of Ofu. The steepest cliffs, 600 feet (180 m) high, are found on this north coast. The Ofu-Olosega island group formed along the same N. 70° W. trending rift which formed Taʻū, another single basaltic dome. The remnant of Taʻū's caldera is found on the south coast. A 2,000-foot (610 m) cliff marks the north coast of this island.

Upolu formed as an elongated basaltic shield volcano due to Late Tertiary to Late Pliocene rifting along a S. 70° E. trend. Remnants of these eruptions are found as inliers and monadnocks forming Mt. Tafatafao, Mt. Vaaifetu, and Mt. Spitzer. Volcanic activity renewed in the Middle Pleistocene along the same rift trend, with olivine basalt pahoehoe and aa flowing northward and southward from a point 8 miles (13 km) west from the center of the island. Pleistocene cinder cones trending east and west, are aligned along the center axis of the island. Savai'i lies along this same rift trend, its surface marked by Quaternary lava flows. Examples include the olivine basalt pahoehoe which emerged from Mount Matavanu from 1905 to 1911, and the Mauga Afi chain of spatter cones of 1902.

== Threats ==
The coral reefs are under significant threat due to rising ocean temperatures and carbon dioxide concentration, as well as sea level rise. As a result of these and other stresses, the corals that form the reefs are projected to be lost by mid-century if carbon dioxide concentrations continue to rise at their current rate.

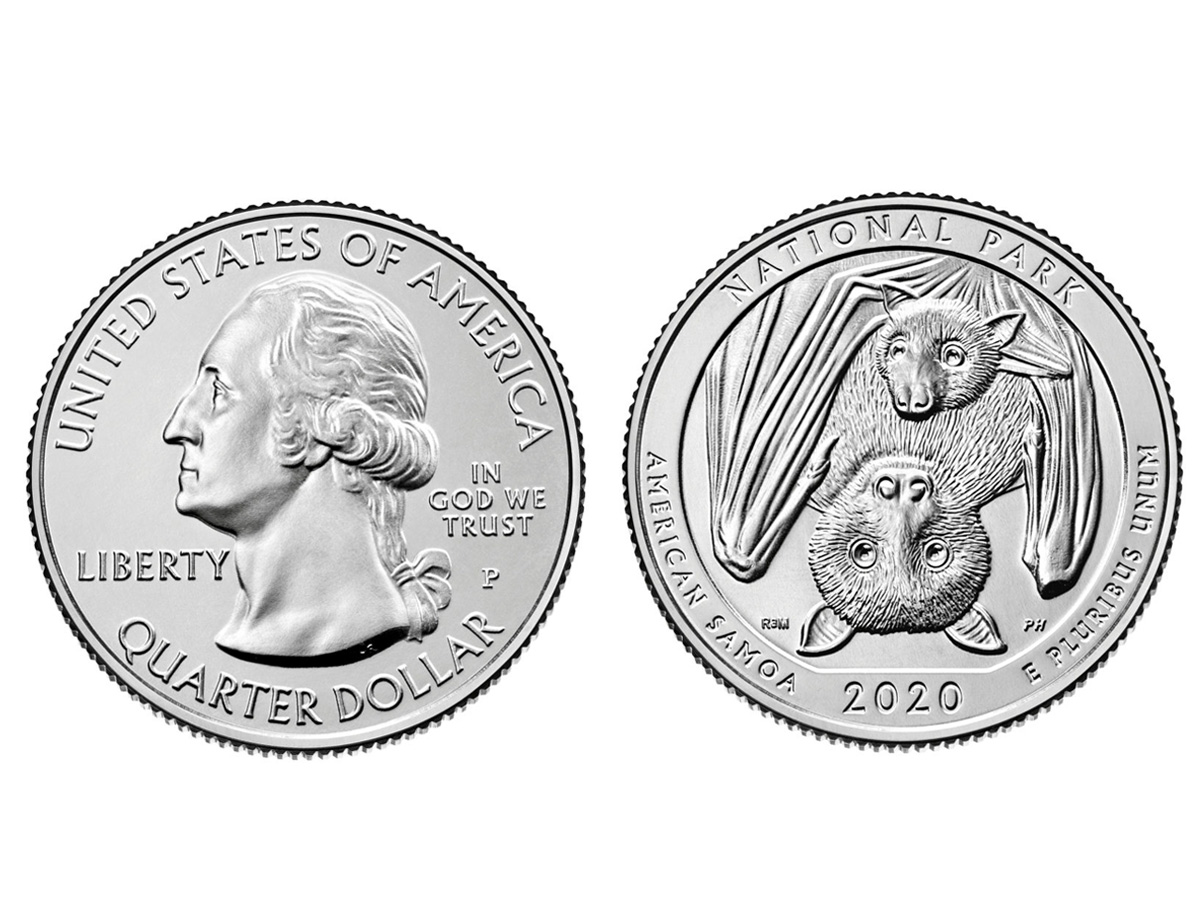
2020 American Samoa quarter featuring the Samoa flying fox

== 2020 American Samoa quarter ==
In 2018, the U.S. Mint had several candidate designs developed for the 2020 National Park of American Samoa quarter for the America the Beautiful series. One of the designs features the familiar image of George Washington by John Flanagan, used on the quarter (heads) since 1932. The (tails) of the quarter features a Samoan fruit bat mother hanging in a tree with her pup. The image represents the remarkable care and energy that this species puts into their offspring. This design is intended to promote awareness to the threatened status of this species due to habitat loss and commercial hunting. The bats on the coins were designed by Richard Alan Masters, who worked as Professor Emeritus at the University of Wisconsin Oshkosh's Department of Art. The designs were selected by the Citizen's Coinage Advisory Committee (CCAC) and the Commission on Fine Art (CFA). The coin was released to the public in February 2020.

== See also ==
- List of birds of Samoa
- List of national parks of the United States
- Samoa flying fox
- Old Vatia, an important archaeological site in the park
- Rose Atoll
- Samoan plant names
- Tonga Trench

== Bibliography ==
- The National Parks: Index 2001–2003. Washington: U.S. Department of the Interior.
