= Amalau Valley =

Valley in Eastern District, United States of America

Coordinates: 14°15′18″S 170°39′33″W

Amalau Valley and Bay
- Interactive map of Amalau Valley and Bay
- Location: National Park of American Samoa, American Samoa
- Nearest city: Vatia and Afono
- Governing body: National Park Service

Amalau is a valley and a bay within the National Park of American Samoa. Amalau Valley is located between Vatia and Afono, and it is an isolated valley with various wildlife such as large numbers of native bird species and flying fox megabats. Amalau Valley is reached on the road leading to Vatia. There are only a few homes at Amalau.

A significant site in the valley contains the remains of an old village. The Tu'ulaumea Tupua near Amalau Valley is an important legendary site. In Amalau Cove, pillow lavas can be observed along the shoreline. The pillow lavas indicate extrusion under water. The beach at the head of Amalau Bay is a mixture of cobbles and basaltic boulders, also with big chunks of coral which have been rounded by the ocean waves.

Amalau Valley has been described as a “prime bird- and bat-watching area."

== Wildlife ==
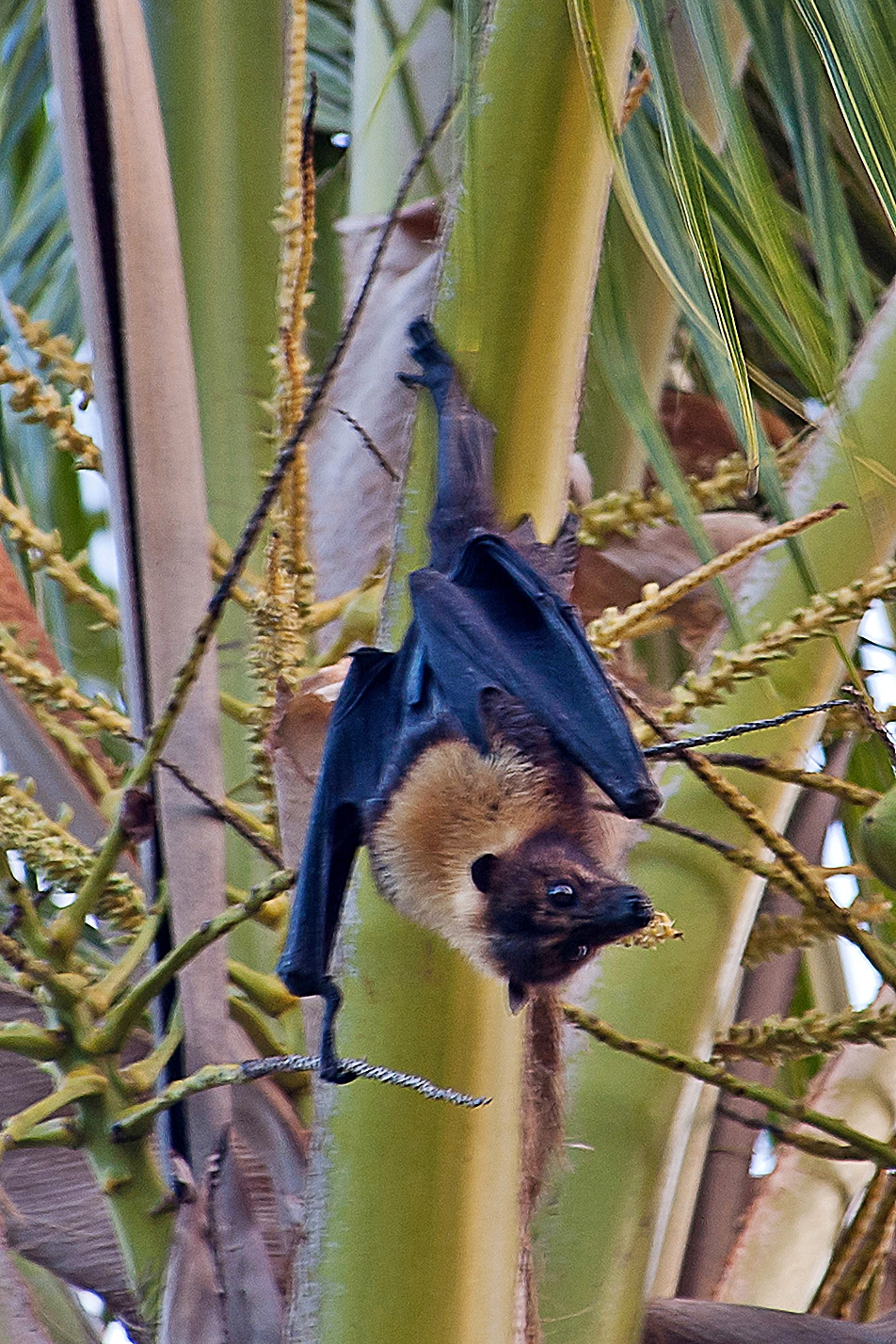
Samoa flying fox

Many-colored Fruit Doves, White-tailed Tropicbirds, White Terns, and Brown Noddies can be found in the Amalau Valley. It is also a good site to observe fruit bats, especially the Samoa flying fox.

The Samoan flying fox can easily be observed in the Amalau Valley during early morning or in the late afternoon. At some parts of the year, the bats remain visible throughout the day. A raised “Bat Observation Tower” platform has been proposed erected in the Amalau Valley in order to allow visitors to observe avifauna such as the flying foxes who frequent this area.
