= List of mammals of Samoa =

This is a list of the mammal species recorded in Samoa. There are nine mammal species in Samoa, of which one is endangered and two are vulnerable.

== Order: Chiroptera (bats) ==
The bats' most distinguishing feature is that their forelimbs are developed as wings, making them the only mammals capable of flight. Bat species account for about 20% of all mammals.

- Family: Pteropodidae (flying foxes, Old World fruit bats)
  - Subfamily: Pteropodinae
    - Genus: Pteropus
      - Samoa flying-fox, Pteropus samoensis VU
      - Insular flying-fox, Pteropus tonganus LR/lc
- Family: Vespertilionidae
  - Subfamily: Myotinae
    - Genus: Myotis
      - Insular myotis, Myotis insularum DD
- Family: Emballonuridae
  - Genus: Emballonura
    - Polynesian sheath-tailed bat, Emballonura semicaudata EN

== Order: Cetacea (whales) ==
The order Cetacea includes whales, dolphins and porpoises. They are the mammals most fully adapted to aquatic life with a spindle-shaped nearly hairless body, protected by a thick layer of blubber, and forelimbs and tail modified to provide propulsion underwater.

- Suborder: Mysticeti
  - Family: Balaenopteridae
    - Subfamily: Megapterinae
      - Genus: Megaptera
        - Humpback whale, Megaptera novaeangliae LC
- Suborder: Odontoceti
  - Superfamily: Platanistoidea
    - Family: Ziphidae
      - Subfamily: Hyperoodontinae
        - Genus: Mesoplodon
          - Ginkgo-toothed beaked whale, Mesoplodon ginkgodens DD
    - Family: Delphinidae (marine dolphins)
      - Genus: Tursiops
        - Bottlenose dolphin, Tursiops truncatus DD
      - Genus: Stenella
        - Spinner dolphin, Stenella longirostris LR/cd
      - Genus: Lagenodelphis
        - Fraser's dolphin, Lagenodelphis hosei DD

== See also ==
- List of birds of Samoa
- List of protected areas of Samoa
- Lists of mammals by region
