= Lake Lanoto'o =

Samoa's largest lake

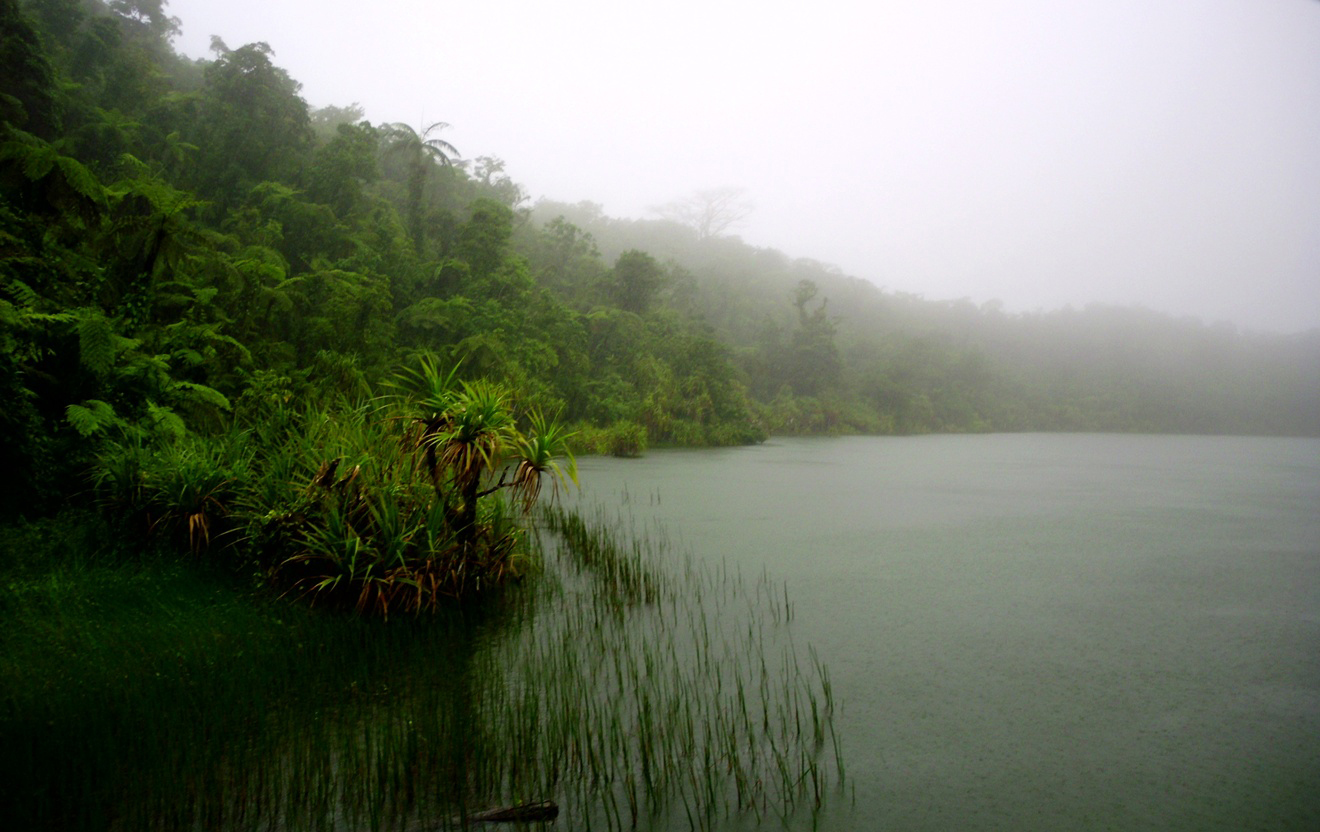
- Lake Lanoto'o

- Location within Samoa
- Coordinates: 13°54′36.72″S 171°49′39.73″W
- Type: Crater lake
- Catchment area: 23 hectares (57 acres)
- Max. length: 400 metres (1,300 ft)
- Surface area: 11 hectares (27 acres)
- Max. depth: 17 metres (56 ft)
- Surface elevation: 760 metres (2,490 ft)

Lake Lanoto'o is a volcanic crater lake on the island of Upolu in Samoa. It is the largest lake in Samoa. The lake is surrounded by Lake Lanoto'o National Park and is designated as a wetland of international importance under the Ramsar Convention.

The lake is 400 metres (1,300 ft) long with a maximum depth of 17 metres (56 ft) and an area of 11 hectares, with a water temperature of 27.8 °C (82.0 °F) and a pH of 5.72. The crater is between 100,000 and 1 million years old.

Sediment cores from the lake have been used to date the human settlement of Upolu and of Polynesia, and to study the paleoclimate and past ecology of Upolu.

The lake provides an important habitat for the Pacific black duck and spotless crake. Goldfish were introduced during the German colonial period.
