= Lake Lanoto'o National Park =

National park in Samoa

- IUCN category II (national park)
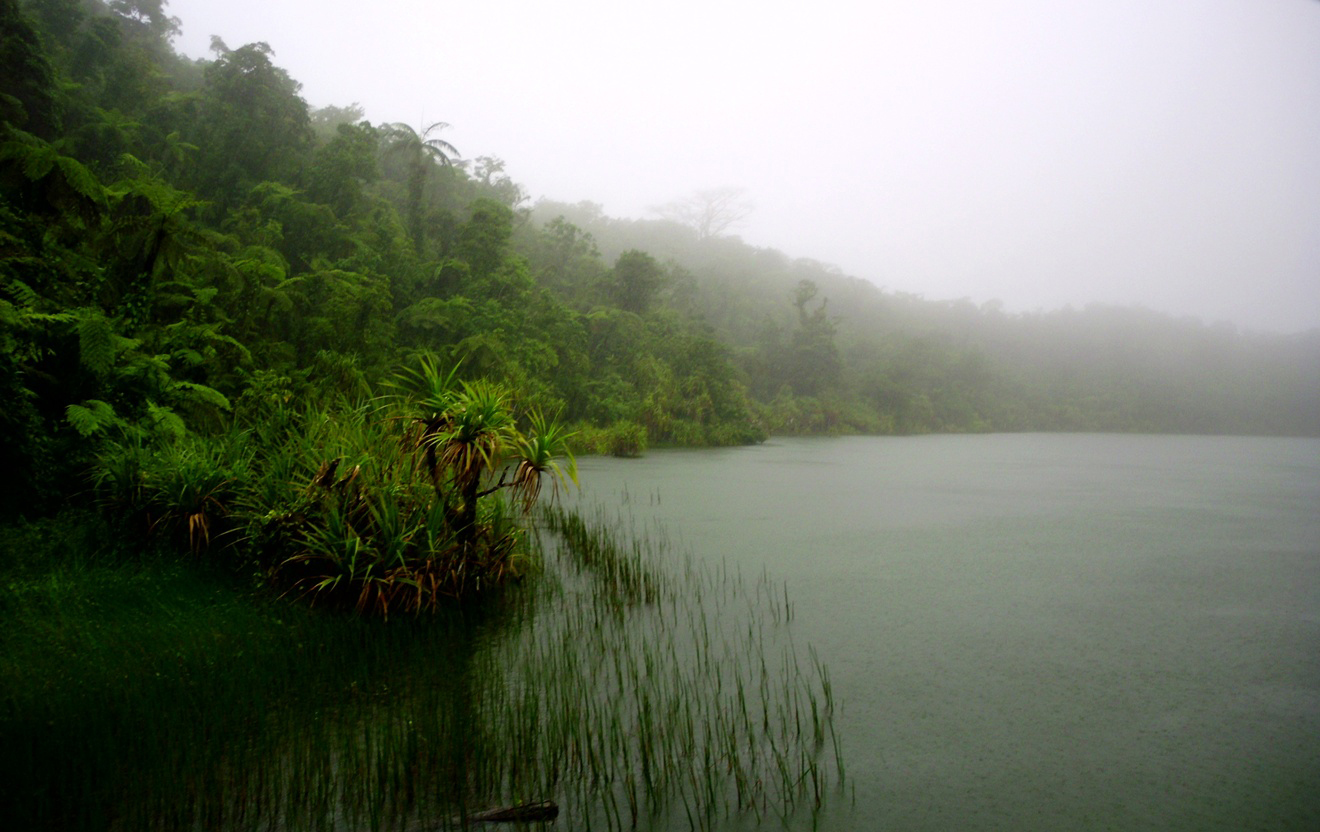
- Lake Lanoto'o

- Location within Samoa
- Location: Upolu, Samoa
- Nearest city: Apia
- Coordinates: 13°54′S 171°50′W
- Area: 4.7 km^{2} (1.8 sq mi)
- Established: 29 May 2003
- Governing body: Ministry of Natural Resources and Environment

Lake Lanoto'o National Park is a national park in Samoa. Established in 2003, the park covers 470 hectares of the central portion of the Tuamasaga district of Upolu and includes three volcanic crater-lakes: Lake Lanoto'o, Lanoata’ata and Lanoanea. In 2004 it was designated as a wetland of international importance under the Ramsar Convention.

The park was established on 29 May 2003 under the authority of the National Parks and Reserves Act 1974.

== Ecology ==
The park contains three highland crater-lakes and surrounding marsh and forest. It provides habitat for endangered birds such as the Manumea and Mao, as well as the Samoan starling, Samoan whistler, Samoan flycatcher, and Samoan triller. The site is also important for the Pacific black duck and Spotless crake, and provides habitat for the Red-headed parrotfinch, Crimson-crowned fruit dove and Flat-billed kingfisher. Lake Lanoto'o itself is home to introduced Goldfish.

The area was badly damaged by Cyclone Ofa in 1990, Cyclone Val in 1991, and Cyclone Heta in 2004.
