= Tafua =

Village in Samoa

Coordinates: 13°47′S 172°13′W

Tafua is a seaside village on the island of Savai'i in Samoa. It is situated on a peninsula on the southeast coast of the island in Palauli district. The population is 406.

While traditionally in Palauli, the village is in electoral district of Fa'asaleleaga 1.

== Tafua Rainforest Preserve ==
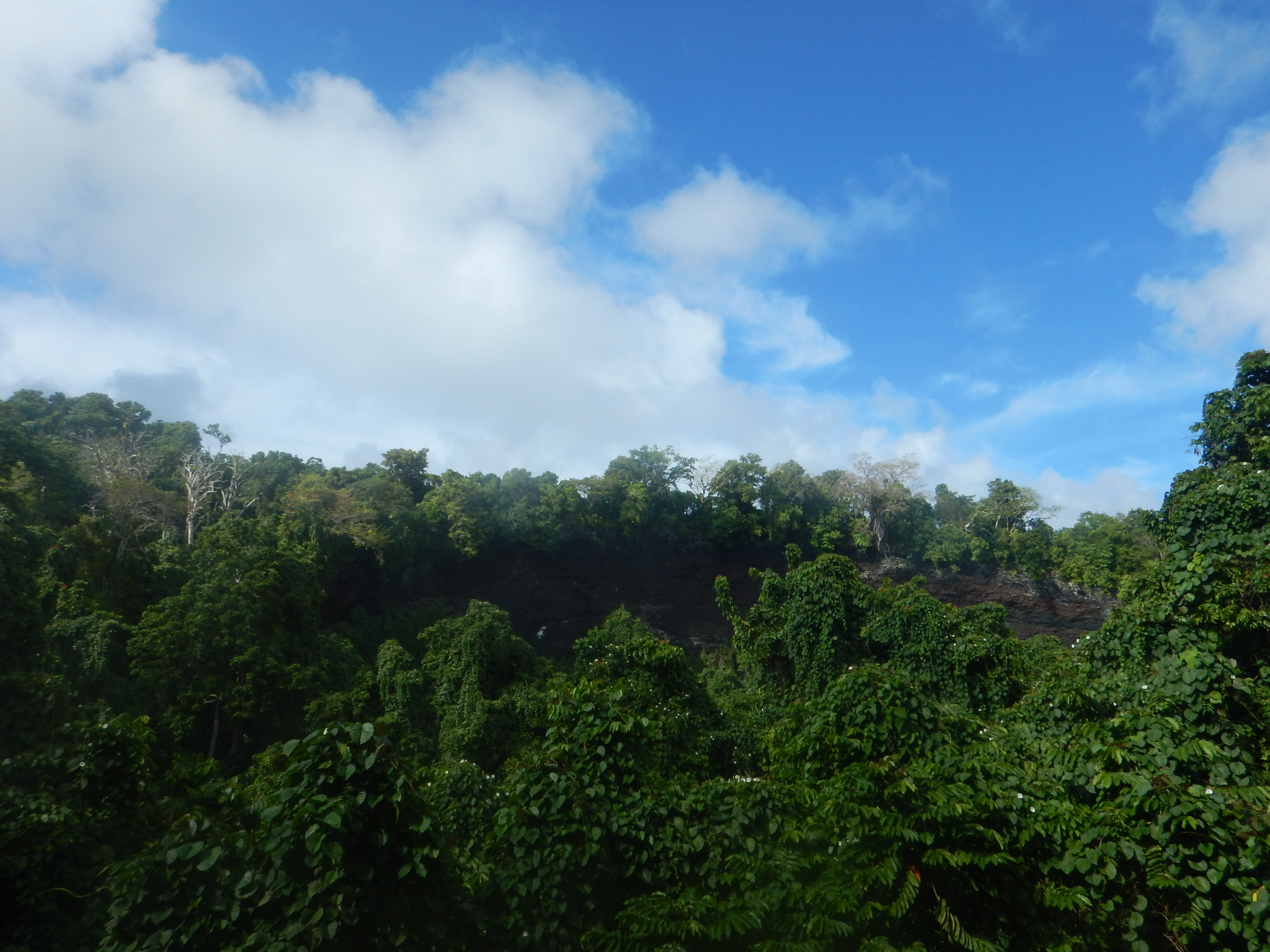
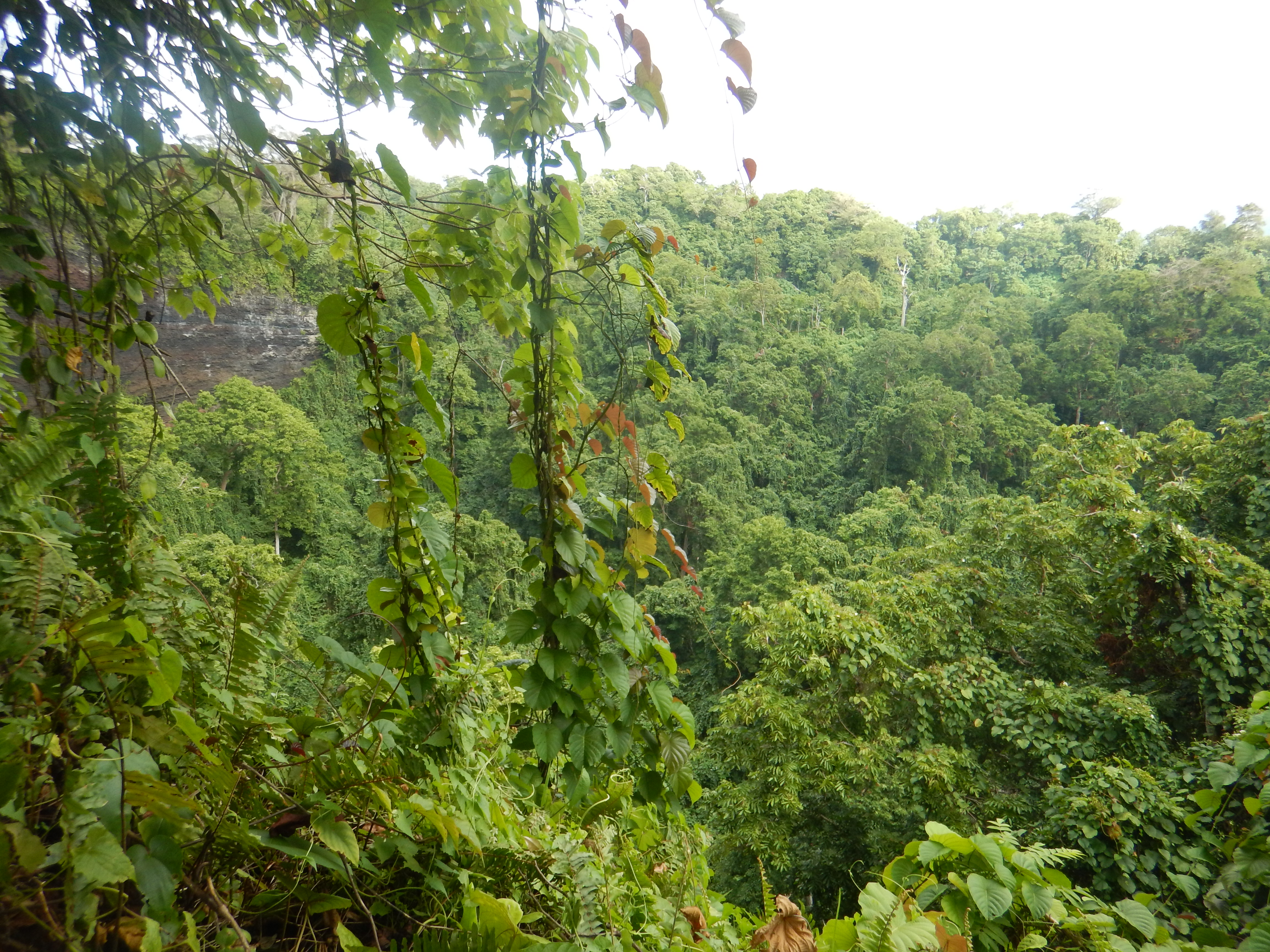
Tafua volcanic crater.

The Tafua Rainforest Preserve was established in 1990 as a covenant between the village chiefs (matai) and funds from Seacology, model Christie Brinkley and the Swedish International Development Cooperation Agency to protect native rainforests. The preserve includes walking tracks in the rainforest and a path to the Tafua volcanic crater where there are rare Samoa flying-fox bats. The forest is also one of the few habitats for the endemic and endangered tooth-billed pigeon (Didunculus strigirostris), called Manumea, the national bird of Samoa. Seacology also funded two fishing boats for the village to help generate local income and livelihoods.

The coastal village is 6 km from the main road at a turnoff five minutes drive south of Salelologa township and ferry terminal.
