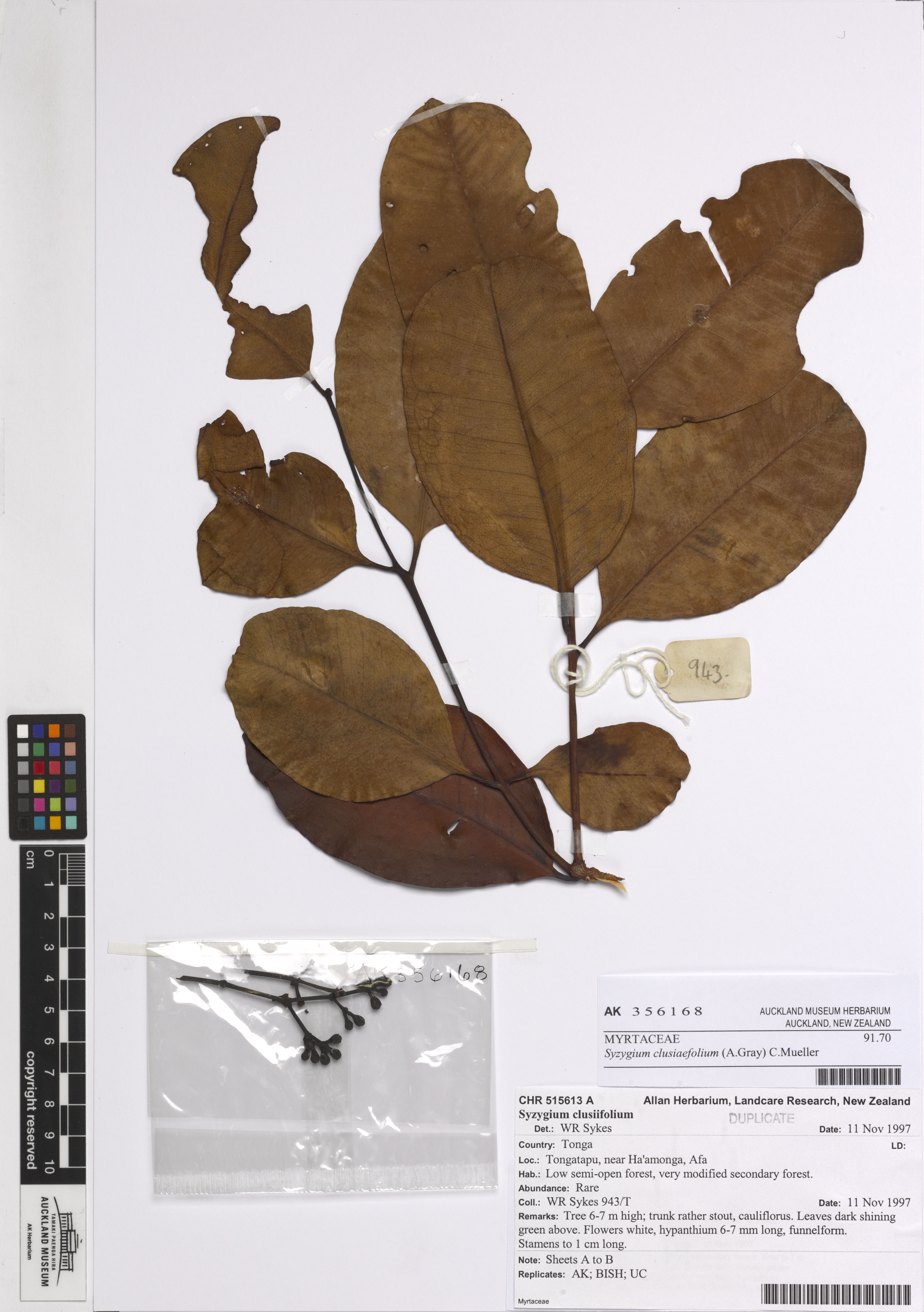

Conservation status
- Least Concern (IUCN 3.1)

Scientific classification
- Kingdom: Plantae
- Clade: Tracheophytes
- Clade: Angiosperms
- Clade: Eudicots
- Clade: Rosids
- Order: Myrtales
- Family: Myrtaceae
- Genus: Syzygium
- Species: S. corynocarpum

Binomial name
- Syzygium corynocarpum (A.Gray) Müll.Berol. (1858)

Synonyms
- Eugenia corynocarpa A.Gray (1854)

= Syzygium corynocarpum =

Species of flowering plant

Syzygium corynocarpum is a species of flowering plant in the myrtle family, Myrtaceae. It is a tree native to Fiji, Niue, Tonga, and Wallis and Futuna. It has been introduced to the Samoan Islands.

It is a small tree native to lowland forest. It is common in Fiji.
