= List of birds of Samoa =

This is a list of the bird species recorded in Samoa. The avifauna of Samoa include a total of 102 species, of which 9 are endemic, and 5 have been introduced by humans and 24 are rare or accidental. 13 species are globally threatened.

This list's taxonomic treatment (designation and sequence of orders, families and species) and nomenclature (common and scientific names) follow the conventions of The Clements Checklist of Birds of the World, 2022 edition. The family accounts at the beginning of each heading reflect this taxonomy, as do the species counts found in each family account. Introduced and accidental species are included in the total counts for Samoa.

The following tags have been used to highlight several categories. Not all species fall into one of these categories. Those that do not are commonly occurring native species.

- (A) Accidental - a species that rarely or accidentally occurs in Samoa
- (E) Endemic - a species endemic to Samoa
- (I) Introduced - a species introduced to Samoa as a consequence, direct or indirect, of human actions
- (Ex) Extirpated – a species no longer found in Samoa or a portion thereof but existing elsewhere

== Ducks, geese, and waterfowl (toloa) ==
Order: Anseriformes Family: Anatidae

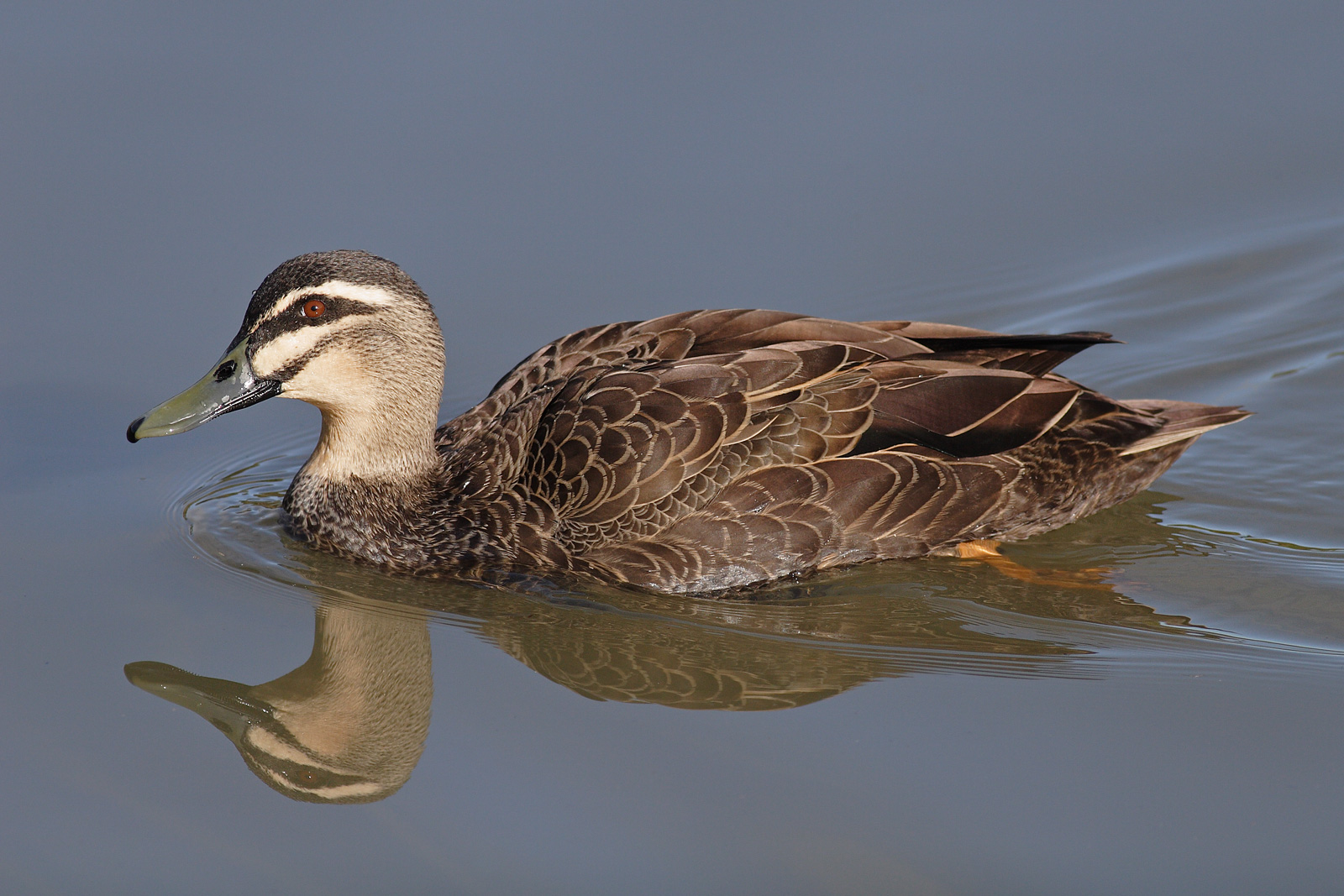
Pacific black duck (Anas superciliosa)

Anatidae includes the ducks and most duck-like waterfowl, such as geese and swans. These birds are adapted to an aquatic existence with webbed feet, flattened bills, and feathers that are excellent at shedding water due to an oily coating.

- Pacific black duck, Anas superciliosa (toloa)
- Northern shoveller, Spatula clypeata (toloa)

== Pheasants, grouse, and allies (moa) ==
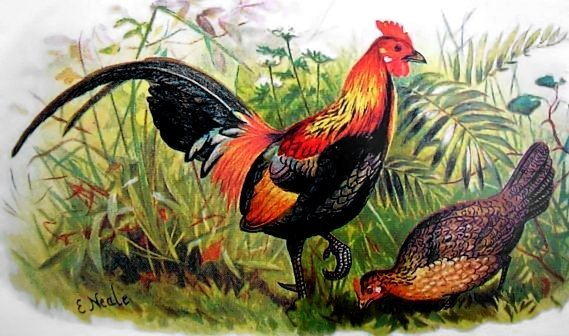
Red junglefowl

Order: Galliformes Family: Phasianidae

The Phasianidae are a family of terrestrial birds which consists of quails, partridges, snowcocks, francolins, spurfowls, tragopans, monals, pheasants, peafowls and jungle fowls. In general, they are plump (although they vary in size) and have broad, relatively short wings.

- Red junglefowl, Gallus gallus (moavao) (I)

== Pigeons and doves ==
Order: Columbiformes Family: Columbidae

Pigeons and doves are stout-bodied birds with short necks and short slender bills with a fleshy cere.

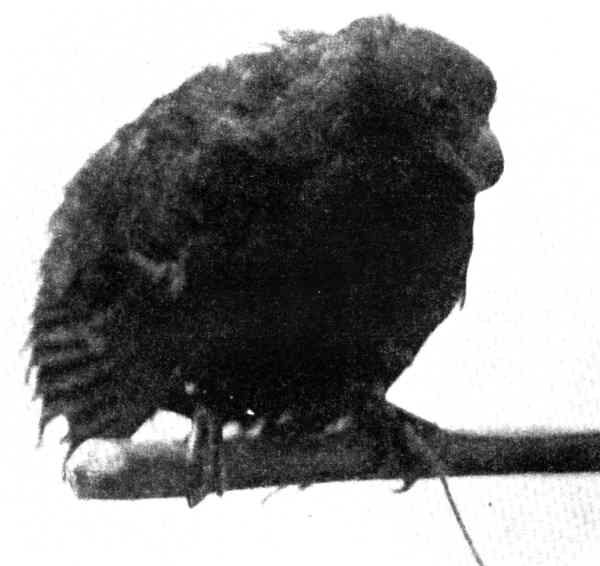
Tooth billed pigeon

- Rock pigeon, Columba livia (lupe palagi, "foreign pigeon") (I)
- Samoan metallic pigeon, Columba vitiensis castaneiceps (fiaui) (E)
- Shy ground dove, Alopecoenas stairi (tu'aimeo, tiotala)
- Tooth-billed pigeon, Didunculus strigirostris (manumea) (E)
- Many-colored fruit-dove, Ptilinopus perousii (manuma, manulua)
- Samoan fruit-dove, Ptilinopus fasciatus (manutagi, manufili)
- Pacific imperial-pigeon, Ducula pacifica (lupe)

== Cuckoos ==
Order: Cuculiformes Family: Cuculidae

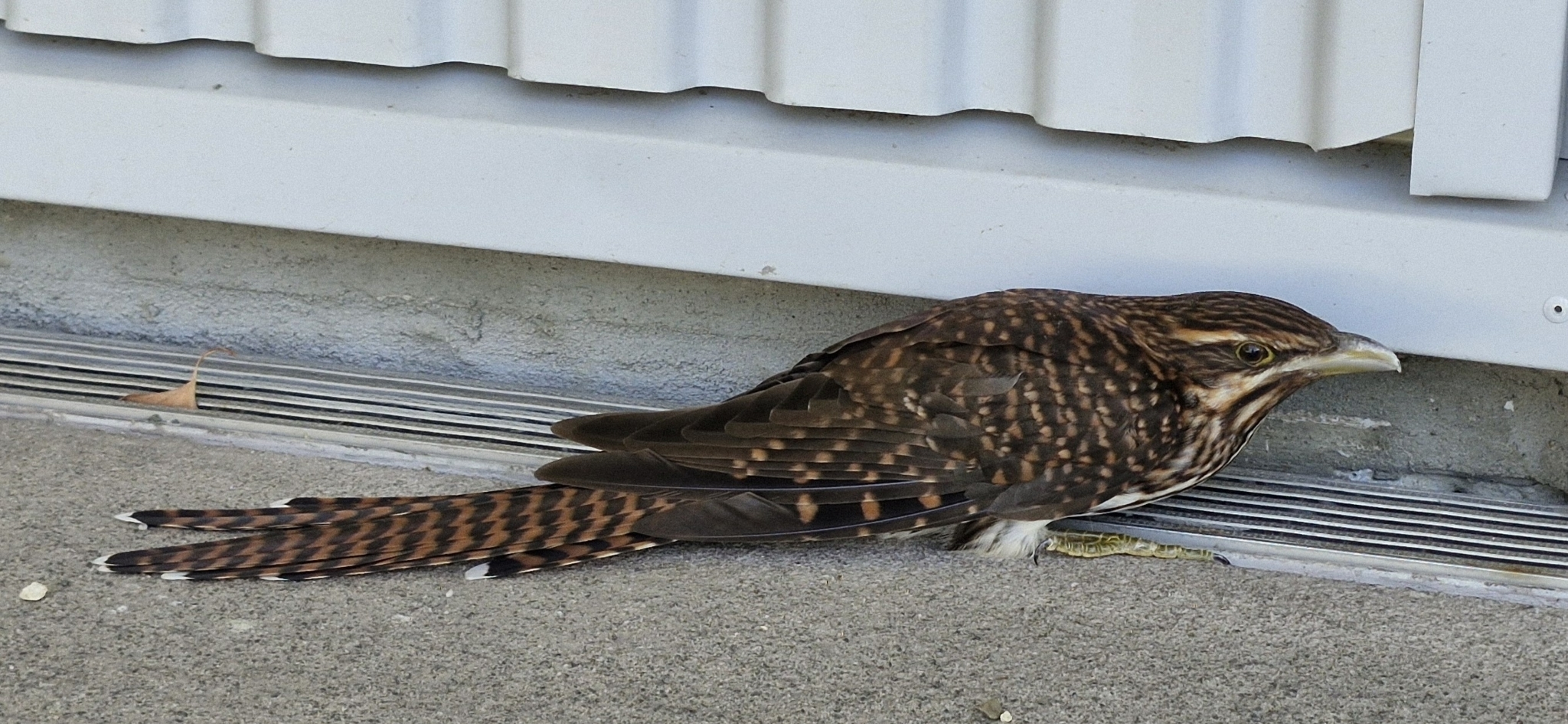
Long tailed cuckoo (Urodynamis taitensis)

The family Cuculidae includes cuckoos, roadrunners and anis. These birds are of variable size with slender bodies, long tails and strong legs. The Old World cuckoos are brood parasites.

- Long-tailed koel, Urodynamis taitensis (aleva)

== Swifts ==
Order: Caprimulgiformes Family: Apodidae

Swifts are small birds which spend the majority of their lives flying. These birds have very short legs and never settle voluntarily on the ground, perching instead only on vertical surfaces. Many swifts have long swept-back wings which resemble a crescent or boomerang.

- White-rumped swiftlet, Aerodramus spodiopygius (pe'ape'a)
- Australian swiftlet, Aerodramus terraereginae (A)

== Rails (ve'a), gallinules (manuali'i), and coots ==
Order: Gruiformes Family: Rallidae

Rallidae is a large family of small to medium-sized birds which includes the rails, crakes, coots and gallinules. Typically they inhabit dense vegetation in damp environments near lakes, swamps or rivers. In general they are shy and secretive birds, making them difficult to observe. Most species have strong legs and long toes which are well adapted to soft uneven surfaces. They tend to have short, rounded wings and to be weak fliers.

- Buff-banded rail, Gallirallus philippensis (ve'a)
- Samoan moorhen, Gallinula pacifica (puna'e) (E)
- Australasian swamphen, Porphyrio melanotus (manuali'i, manusa)
- White-browed crake, Poliolimnas cinereus (vai)
- Spotless crake, Zapornia tabuensis

== Plovers and lapwings (tuli) ==
Order: Charadriiformes Family: Charadriidae

The family Charadriidae includes the plovers, dotterels and lapwings. They are small to medium-sized birds with compact bodies, short, thick necks and long, usually pointed, wings. They are found in open country worldwide, mostly in habitats near water.

- Black-bellied plover, Pluvialis squatarola (A)
- Pacific golden-plover, Pluvialis fulva
- Semipalmated plover, Charadrius semipalmatus (A)

== Sandpipers and allies (tuli) ==
Order: Charadriiformes Family: Scolopacidae

Scolopacidae is a large diverse family of small to medium-sized shorebirds including the sandpipers, curlews, godwits, shanks, tattlers, woodcocks, snipes, dowitchers and phalaropes. The majority of these species eat small invertebrates picked out of the mud or soil. Variation in length of legs and bills enables multiple species to feed in the same habitat, particularly on the coast, without direct competition for food.

- Bristle-thighed curlew, Numenius tahitiensis (tuli)
- Whimbrel, Numenius phaeopus (tuli)
- Far Eastern curlew, Numenius madagascariensis (A)
- Bar-tailed godwit, Limosa lapponica (tuli)
- Ruddy turnstone, Arenaria interpres (tuli)
- Red knot, Calidris canutus (tuli) (A)
- Sharp-tailed sandpiper, Calidris acuminata (tuli) (A)
- Red-necked stint, Calidris ruficollis (tuli) (A)
- Sanderling, Calidris alba (tuli) (A)
- Pectoral sandpiper, Calidris melanotos (tuli) (A)
- Long-billed dowitcher, Limnodromus scolopaceus (tuli) (A)
- Common sandpiper, Actitis hypoleucos (tuli) (A)
- Gray-tailed tattler, Tringa brevipes (A)
- Wandering tattler, Tringa incana (tuli, alomalala)
- Wood sandpiper, Tringa glareola (tuli) (A)

== Skuas and jaegers ==
Order: Charadriiformes Family: Stercorariidae

The family Stercorariidae are, in general, medium to large birds, typically with grey or brown plumage, often with white markings on the wings. They nest on the ground in temperate and arctic regions and are long-distance migrants.

- South polar skua, Stercorarius maccormicki (A)
- Brown skua, Stercorarius antarcticus (A)
- Pomarine jaeger, Stercorarius pomarinus (A)

== Gulls, terns, and skimmers ==
Order: Charadriiformes Family: Laridae

Laridae is a family of medium to large seabirds, the gulls, terns, and skimmers. Gulls are typically grey or white, often with black markings on the head or wings. They have stout, longish bills and webbed feet. Terns are a group of generally medium to large seabirds typically with grey or white plumage, often with black markings on the head. Most terns hunt fish by diving but some pick insects off the surface of fresh water. Terns are generally long-lived birds, with several species known to live in excess of 30 years.

- Laughing gull, Leucophaeus atricilla (A)
- Brown noddy, Anous stolidus (gogo)
- Black noddy, Anous minutus
- Blue-gray noddy, Anous ceruleus (laia) (A)
- White tern, Gygis alba (manusina, gogosina)
- Sooty tern, Onychoprion fuscatus (gogouli) (A)
- Gray-backed tern, Onychoprion lunatus
- Bridled tern, Onychoprion anaethetus
- Little tern, Sternula albifrons (A)
- Roseate tern, Sterna dougallii (A)
- Black-naped tern, Sterna sumatrana (gogosina)
- Common tern, Sterna hirundo (A)
- Great crested tern, Thalasseus bergii

== Tropicbirds (tava'e) ==
Order: Phaethontiformes Family: Phaethontidae

Tropicbirds are slender white birds of tropical oceans, with exceptionally long central tail feathers. Their heads and long wings have black markings.

- White-tailed tropicbird, Phaethon lepturus (tava'e sina)
- Red-tailed tropicbird, Phaethon rubricauda (tava'e 'ula) (A)

== Southern storm-petrels (ta'i'o) ==
Order: Procellariiformes Family: Oceanitidae

The southern storm-petrels are relatives of the petrels and are the smallest seabirds. They feed on planktonic crustaceans and small fish picked from the surface, typically while hovering. The flight is fluttering and sometimes bat-like.

- Black-bellied storm-petrel, Fregetta tropica (A)
- Polynesian storm-petrel, Nesofregetta fuliginosa

== Shearwaters and petrels (ta'i'o) ==
Order: Procellariiformes Family: Procellariidae

The procellariids are the main group of medium-sized "true petrels", characterised by united nostrils with medium septum and a long outer functional primary.

- Herald petrel, Pterodroma heraldica (A)
- Mottled petrel, Pterodroma inexpectata (ta'i'o)
- White-necked petrel, Pterodroma cervicalis (A)
- Black-winged petrel, Pterodroma nigripennis (A)
- Gould's petrel, Pterodroma leucoptera (A)
- Collared petrel, Pterodroma brevipes (A)
- Stejneger's petrel, Pterodroma longirostris (A)
- Flesh-footed shearwater, Ardenna carneipes (A)
- Wedge-tailed shearwater, Ardenna pacifica
- Buller's shearwater, Ardenna bulleri (A)
- Sooty shearwater, Ardenna grisea
- Short-tailed shearwater, Ardenna tenuirostris
- Newell's shearwater, Puffinus newelli (A)
- Tropical shearwater, Puffinus bailloni (ta'i'o)

== Frigatebirds (atafa) ==
Order: Suliformes Family: Fregatidae

Frigatebirds are large seabirds usually found over tropical oceans. They are large, black-and-white or completely black, with long wings and deeply forked tails. The males have coloured inflatable throat pouches. They do not swim or walk and cannot take off from a flat surface. Having the largest wingspan-to-body-weight ratio of any bird, they are essentially aerial, able to stay aloft for more than a week.

- Lesser frigatebird, Fregata ariel (atafa) (A)
- Great frigatebird, Fregata minor (atafa)

== Boobies and gannets (fua'o) ==
Order: Suliformes Family: Sulidae

The sulids comprise the gannets and boobies. Both groups are medium to large coastal seabirds that plunge-dive for fish.

- Masked booby, Sula dactylatra (fua'o)
- Brown booby, Sula leucogaster (fua'o)
- Red-footed booby, Sula sula (fua'o)

== Herons, egrets, and bitterns (matu'u) ==
Order: Pelecaniformes Family: Ardeidae

The family Ardeidae contains the bitterns, herons, and egrets. Herons and egrets are medium to large wading birds with long necks and legs. Bitterns tend to be shorter necked and more wary. Members of Ardeidae fly with their necks retracted, unlike other long-necked birds such as storks, ibises and spoonbills.

- White-faced heron, Egretta novaehollandiae (A)
- Pacific reef-heron, Egretta sacra (matu'u)

== Barn-owls ==
Order: Strigiformes Family: Tytonidae

Barn-owls are medium to large owls with large heads and characteristic heart-shaped faces. They have long strong legs with powerful talons.

- Eastern barn owl, Tyto javanica (lulu)

== Kingfishers ==
Order: Coraciiformes Family: Alcedinidae

Kingfishers are medium-sized birds with large heads, long, pointed bills, short legs and stubby tails.

- Pacific kingfisher, Todiramphus sacer (A)
- Flat-billed kingfisher, Todiramphus recurvirostris (ti'otala) (E)
- Collared kingfisher, Todiramphus chloris (A)

== Falcons and caracaras ==
Order: Falconiformes Family: Falconidae

Falconidae is a family of diurnal birds of prey. They differ from hawks, eagles and kites in that they kill with their beaks instead of their talons.

- Peregrine falcon, Falco peregrinus

== Old World parrots ==
Order: Psittaciformes Family: Psittaculidae

Characteristic features of parrots include a strong curved bill, an upright stance, strong legs, and clawed zygodactyl feet. Many parrots are vividly colored, and some are multi-colored. In size they range from 8 cm (3.1 in) to 1 m (3.3 ft) in length. Old World parrots are found from Africa east across south and southeast Asia and Oceania to Australia and New Zealand.

- Blue-crowned lorikeet, Vini australis (sega, sega'ula, segavao)

== Honeyeaters ==
Order: Passeriformes Family: Meliphagidae

The honeyeaters are a large and diverse family of small to medium-sized birds most common in Australia and New Guinea. They are nectar feeders and closely resemble other nectar-feeding passerines.

- Samoan myzomela, Myzomela nigriventris (segasegamau'u) (E)
- Mao, Gymnomyza samoensis (ma'oma'o) (E)
- Eastern wattled-honeyeater, Foulehaio carunculatus (iao)

== Cuckooshrikes ==
Order: Passeriformes Family: Campephagidae

The cuckooshrikes are small to medium-sized passerine birds. They are predominantly greyish with white and black, although some species are brightly coloured.

- Polynesian triller, Lalage maculosa (miti)
- Samoan triller, Lalage sharpei (mititae) (E)

== Whistlers and allies ==
Order: Passeriformes Family: Pachycephalidae

The family Pachycephalidae includes the whistlers, shrikethrushes, and some of the pitohuis.

- Samoan whistler, Pachycephala flavifrons (vasavasa) (E)

== Fantails ==
Order: Passeriformes Family: Rhipiduridae

The fantails are small insectivorous birds which are specialist aerial feeders.

- Samoan fantail, Rhipidura nebulosa (sau) (E)

== Monarch flycatchers ==
Order: Passeriformes Family: Monarchidae

The monarch flycatchers are small to medium-sized insectivorous passerines which hunt by flycatching.

- Samoan flycatcher, Myiagra albiventris (tolai'ula, tolaifatu) (E)
- Fiji shrikebill, Clytorhynchus vitiensis (Ex)

== Australasian robins ==
Order: Passeriformes Family: Petroicidae

Most species of Petroicidae have a stocky build with a large rounded head, a short straight bill and rounded wingtips. They occupy a wide range of wooded habitats, from subalpine to tropical rainforest and mangrove swamp to semi-arid scrubland. All are primarily insectivores, although a few supplement their diet with seeds.

- Pacific robin, Petroica pusilla (tolai'ula)

== Swallows ==
Order: Passeriformes Family: Hirundinidae

The family Hirundinidae is adapted to aerial feeding. They have a slender streamlined body, long pointed wings and a short bill with a wide gape. The feet are adapted to perching rather than walking, and the front toes are partially joined at the base.

- Pacific swallow, Hirundo tahitica (A)

== Bulbuls ==
Order: Passeriformes Family: Pycnonotidae

Bulbuls are medium-sized songbirds. Some are colourful with yellow, red or orange vents, cheeks, throats or supercilia, but most are drab, with uniform olive-brown to black plumage. Some species have distinct crests.

- Red-vented bulbul, Pycnonotus cafer (manu palagi, "foreign bird") (I)

== White-eyes, yuhinas, and allies ==
Order: Passeriformes Family: Zosteropidae

The white-eyes are small and mostly undistinguished, their plumage above being generally some dull colour like greenish-olive, but some species have a white or bright yellow throat, breast or lower parts, and several have buff flanks. As their name suggests, many species have a white ring around each eye.

- Samoan white-eye, Zosterops samoensis (matapapa'e) (E)

== Starlings ==
Order: Passeriformes Family: Sturnidae

Starlings are small to medium-sized passerine birds. Their flight is strong and direct and they are very gregarious. Their preferred habitat is fairly open country. They eat insects and fruit. Plumage is typically dark with a metallic sheen.

- Polynesian starling, Aplonis tabuensis (miti, mitivao)
- Samoan starling, Aplonis atrifusca (fuia) (E)
- Common myna, Acridotheres tristis (I)
- Jungle myna, Acridotheres fuscus (I)

== Thrushes and allies ==
Order: Passeriformes Family: Turdidae

The thrushes are a group of passerine birds that occur mainly in the Old World. They are plump, soft plumaged, small to medium-sized insectivores or sometimes omnivores, often feeding on the ground. Many have attractive songs.

- Samoan island-thrush, Turdus samoensis (tutumalili) (E)

== Waxbills and allies ==
Order: Passeriformes Family: Estrildidae

The estrildid finches are small passerine birds of the Old World tropics and Australasia. They are gregarious and often colonial seed eaters with short thick but pointed bills. They are all similar in structure and habits, but have wide variation in plumage colours and patterns.

- Red-headed parrotfinch, Erythrura cyaneovirens (manu'ai)

== See also ==
- List of birds
- Lists of birds by region
- List of protected areas of Samoa
- Central Savai'i Rainforest – biodiversity area in Samoa; largest continuous patch of rainforest in Polynesia
- Fagaloa Bay – Uafato Tiavea Conservation Zone
- Tafua Rainforest Preserve
- Falealupo – rainforest conversation area
- Aleipata Islands – conservation area
- Samoan plant names
