= Seacology =

Nonprofit organization in the United States

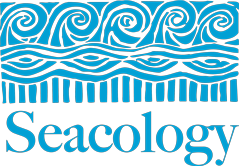
- Founded: 1991
- Founder: Paul Alan Cox; Ken Murdock; Bill Marré
- Type: 501(c)(3)
- Tax ID no.: 87-0495235
- Purpose: Island conservation
- Location: 1623 Solano Ave., Berkeley, California, US
- Region served: Global (islands)
- Key people: Chairman Paul Alan Cox; Executive Director Duane Silverstein; Vice Chair Ken Murdock
- Revenue: Donations, grants, and royalties
- Employees: 8 full-time staff, 26 part-time field representatives
- Website: seacology.org

Seacology is a nonprofit 501(c)(3) charitable organization headquartered in Berkeley, California, United States. It works to preserve island ecosystems and cultures worldwide. Founded in 1991, it began with the work of ethnobotanist Paul Alan Cox, who researched tropical plants and their medicinal value in the village of Falealupo in Samoa during the mid-1980s. When the villagers were pressured into selling logging rights to their rainforest in 1988 to build a new school, Cox and his wife offered to help secure funds for the new school in return for an agreement with the villagers to protect their forest. With the help of his friends and family, Cox secured the funds within six months, later earning him and the village chief, Fuiono Senio, the Goldman Environmental Prize for their efforts. Word spread throughout the islands, and with increasing demand for similar projects, Cox, along with Bill Marré and Ken Murdock, decided to form Seacology and expand their work internationally. For the first few years, the organization operated on a volunteer basis.

Because of the high risk of extinction for island fauna and the decline in coral reef ecosystems, Seacology's primary focus is projects in which villagers sign contracts under which they agree to help protect either terrestrial or marine habitat for a specified time in return for new buildings or services. The operations are low-cost, averaging around US$20,000 to $25,000. Construction is done with local labor and sometimes without the use of machinery. Seacology selects its projects by reviewing the recommendations of its field representatives and its scientific advisory board.

By 2020, Seacology had initiated more than 320 projects globally, and helped preserve 760,879 acres (3,079 km^{2}; 1,189 sq mi) of marine habitat and 579,700 acres (2,346 km^{2}; 905.8 sq mi) of terrestrial habitat. At the same time, they had helped construct new facilities and provided programs including educational materials, vital medical services, and environmental training. In addition to helping local people on islands like those in Fiji, the Philippines, and many others, their projects have helped protect mangrove forests, sea turtles, dugongs, and one of the rarest primates in the world: the Hainan black crested gibbon. Seacology also awards an annual Seacology Prize to indigenous islanders for their efforts in conservation and cultural preservation. The organization helps support island communities by fostering ecotourism, and has helped raise emergency funds following destructive tsunamis and other natural disasters. Its budget is modest, and it does not compensate its board members. It has won awards from Yahoo! and Travel + Leisure magazine, and has been featured in the music video "What About Now" by the American rock band Daughtry.

== History ==
Seacology was founded in 1991 by ethnobotanist Paul Alan Cox and his wife Barbara resulting from his efforts to preserve 30,000 acres (120 km^{2}; 47 sq mi) of rainforest outside the village of Falealupo on the island of Savai'i in Samoa. He later recorded these events in his book, Nafanua: Saving the Samoan Rain Forest. Cox volunteered in Samoa for two years from 1973 to 1974 as a missionary for the Church of Jesus Christ of Latter-day Saints at which time he became fluent in common and chiefly Samoan, and deeply enamored of Samoan culture. After returning to Samoa for field work during his PhD studies in rain forest biology at Harvard University, and acquiring competency in Tongan and other Polynesian languages, Cox used funds from a Presidential Young Investigator Award given him by President Ronald Reagan to return with his young family to the remote island of Savaii in Samoa. His aim was to find a cure for metastatic breast cancer, which had claimed the life of his mother, scientist Rae G. Cox, earlier the previous year. In return for the help of the local healers (called fofo), and with the permission of the local village chiefs and the Prime Minister of Samoa, Cox prevailed on his colleagues at the U. S. National Cancer Institute to share the revenue generated by his search for new drugs with the local villages and the Samoan government. Over time, his research identified the therapeutic agent prostratin, a potential treatment for HIV. Prostratin was isolated in a concoction made from the bark of the local mamala tree (Homalanthus nutans) and shared with him by a traditional healer named Epenesa Mauigoa, who used it to treat hepatitis. Cox set up royalty agreements with the National Cancer Institute and Brigham Young University to ensure that the Samoans will share in any commercial development of the drug.

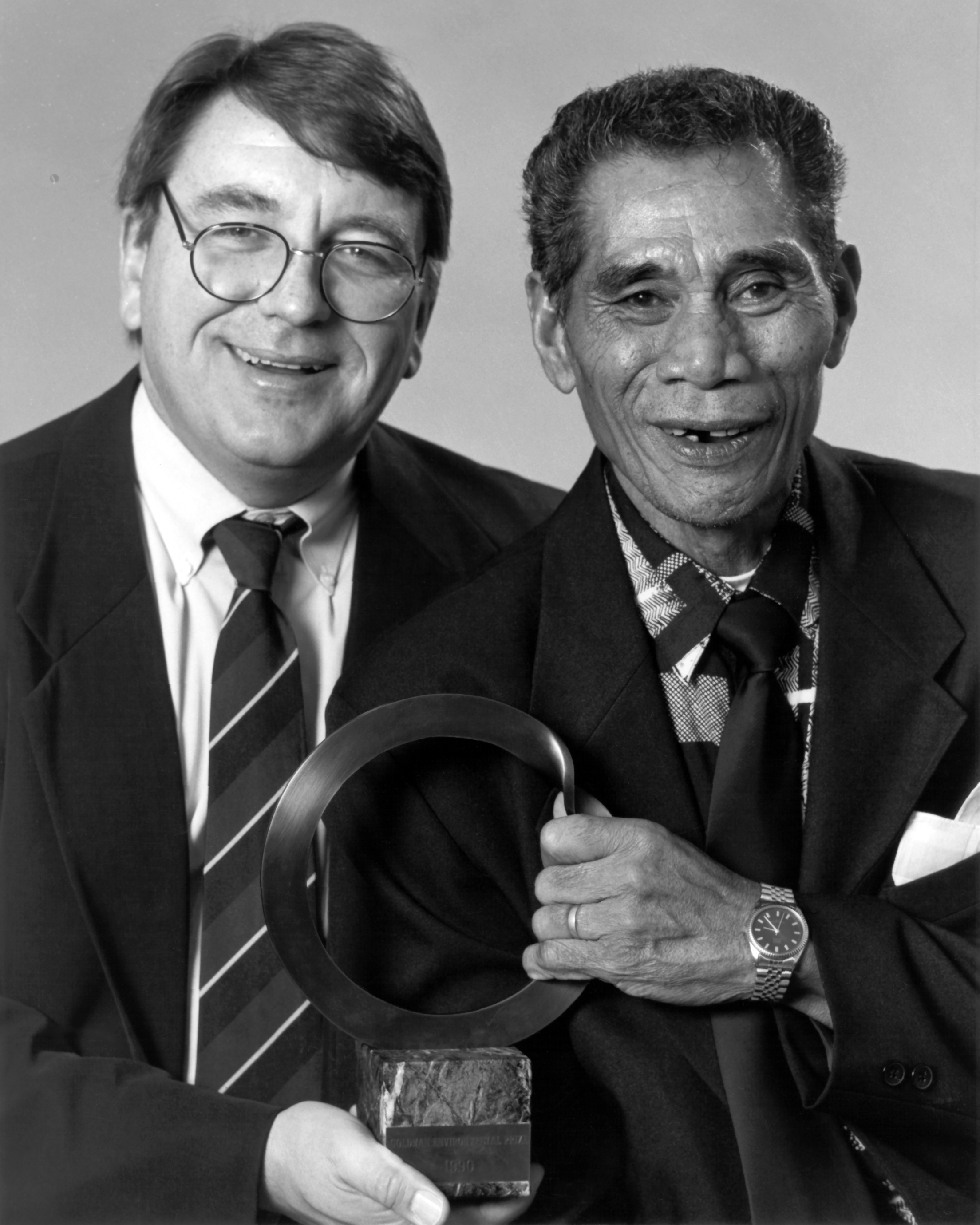
Ethnobiologist Paul Alan Cox (left) and village chief Fuiono Senio (right) won the Goldman Environmental Prize in 1997 for their conservation efforts at Falealupo. Their work later led to the founding of Seacology.

In 1988, the rain forest was threatened when the Samoan government pressured the village of Falealupo to pay $85,000 for a new school, warning that if the village did not provide a new school within a year, they would withdraw the teachers from the village, leaving the children without an opportunity for a formal education. Shortly after receiving this notice from government, a foreign-owned logging company offered the village exactly $85,000 to log the entire 30,000 acres (120 km^{2}; 47 sq mi) surrounding Falealupo. Lacking a source of revenue, the villages eventually sold the logging rights to the forest, but when Cox learned of the situation and witnessed the logging for himself, he immediately sought an explanation from the village chiefs and then requested that they halt the logging so that he could raise money for the school. Despite initial skepticism, Cox addressed the assembled village chiefs and convinced the high orator, Fuiono Senio, who then helped persuade the rest of the elders. Senio and another chief then took their machete and raced 5 kilometres (3.1 mi) to halt the logging.

The new school was built after Cox and his wife, Barbara, were able to raise the money in six months by offering to mortgage their house in the United States. Cox arranged with the Samoan Development Bank to immediately take over payments on the mortgage for the school. Verne Read, a businessman and financial supporter of Bat Conservation International, subsequently assumed payments on the mortgage for the school until the completed funds could be raised. Ken Murdock, founder of the herbal company Nature's Way, and Rex Maughan, owner of Forever Living Products, together with Cox, his family, and students funded the construction of the school and repaid the loggers for their $20,000 advance. During a large village ceremony held in January 1989, Cox, along with the village chiefs (matai) signed "The Falealupo Covenant", which legally protected the forest for 50 years in exchange for their help. During the ceremony, the village chiefs also bestowed high chief's titles on Murdock and Maughan. To Cox's surprise, the chiefs proclaimed that Cox was a reincarnation of an ancient deity, Nafanua, because like Nafanua, he did not come from Samoa and both had fought to protect the village and the forest. This bestowal of one of the highest national titles was registered with the Samoan Lands and Title Court, and made national news throughout Samoa and the islands of Polynesia; in Manu'a, Fiji, Tonga, Tahiti, and other islands of Polynesia, Cox is commonly referred to by his title, Nafanua, rather than his Christian name.

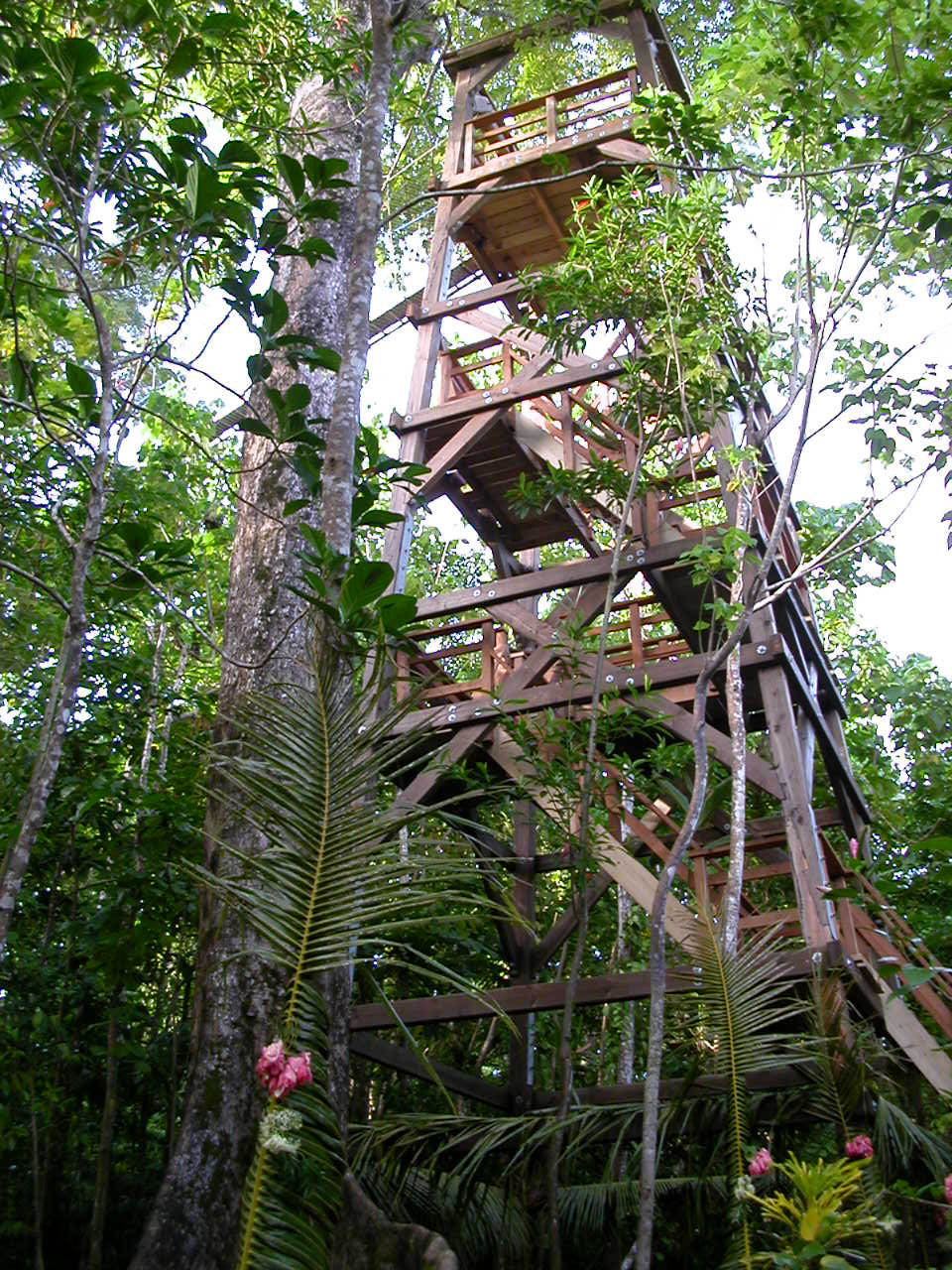
The canopy walkway in Falealupo (seen from its base) is a popular tourist attraction and has helped the community generate revenue.

In 1992, Cox, his Swedish postdoctoral student Dr. Thomas Elmqvist, and their colleagues at the Swedish Society for Nature Conservation helped protect the lowland rainforest of Tafua on the opposite side of the island, which encountered the same problem. Prior to that, Murdock, who later subsequently became Seacology's President, suggested continuing their work by seeking out more villages with which they could exchange projects for marine and forest reserves. As demand among island villages grew, Bill Marré, a business consultant and executive coach who later became a member of the board of trustees and the Chairman's Advisory Council, suggested establishing a nonprofit organization to continue their work. He suggested the name "Seacology" to reflect the organization's focus on conservation both terrestrial and marine habitats in islands, and helped cofound the nonprofit in 1991, along with Cox and Murdock. Using his own funds, Marré paid the costs of starting the organization and covered its administrative costs for the first three years. Together with his assistant Rita Despain, Marré helped advertise Seacology by giving lectures at schools and universities, visiting other island nations, and writing articles about the work for the local media.

In Falealupo, Seacology continued their work, funding projects with a total of $485,000 as of 2005. When cyclone Ofa destroyed the primary school at Falealupo in 1990, Seacology helped raise funds to rebuild it. The school was completely rebuilt again in 1991 following Cyclone Val. Several years after completing the school, the organization helped establish trails and build a rainforest information center, followed in 1997 by an elevated canopy walkway as part of an ecotourism project to help generate ecotourism income for the peopleusing a grant from Nu Skin International and provide funds for a retirement system for the village elders. The walkway has since become one of Samoa's leading tourist attractions, and was yielding an average of $1,000 each month for the community in 2001—bringing in more money than the villagers would have earned from selling their forest. Satisfied with the results, the villagers at Falealupo declared that they would honor the contract they had made with Cox to protect the forest forever, rather than just 50 years. In 1997, both Cox and Senio, the village chief, shared the Goldman Environmental Prize for their work. Cox gifted his share of the Goldman Prize funds to Seacology as an endowment for the Falealupo Rain Forest and other island rain projects. Proceeds have been used to help the village maintain the Falealupo Rain Forest canopy walkway.

For the first six years of its existence, Seacology operated as a volunteer organization with no employees. Four years after being founded, Seacology's administrative office moved to Ken Murdock's office. The office moved again in 1999 to Berkeley, California after Cox offered a job to Duane Silverstein—then the Executive Director of the Goldman Fund, which had previously honored Cox with the Goldman Environmental Prize. Silverstein had been inspired by the work Cox had done in Samoa, and agreed to take the position of Executive Director of Seacology under the condition that the office be relocated to within walking distance of his house. As a former Miller Research Fellow at Miller Institute for Basic Research in Science at the University of California, Berkeley, Cox rapidly approved the move of Seacology to Berkeley.

In 2007, Seacology became an international organization with greater visibility, despite their small staff. International affiliate programs, such as Seacology Germany and Seacology Japan were created to help raise funds to support island projects. The following year, Seacology U.K. was created, followed by Seacology Scandinavia in 2009.

For its global efforts, Seacology has received several awards, including the Global Vision Award in Travel + Leisure, the Blue Award in Islands Magazine, and Yahoo!'s Pick for Good in September 2006. Others have included, the Prince’s Prize for Innovative Nonprofits Laureate, awarded by Albert II, Prince of Monaco and a Momentum For Change award, given by the United Nations Framework Convention on Climate Change. In 2024, Seacology was the top recipient of the Lipman Family Prize for outstanding vision, inspiration and impact, awarded by the University of Pennsylvania. Executive Director Duane Silverstein accepted the prize in a ceremony at the Wharton School of Business.

Seacology was also nominated for the 2020 Nobel Peace Prize.

== Activities ==
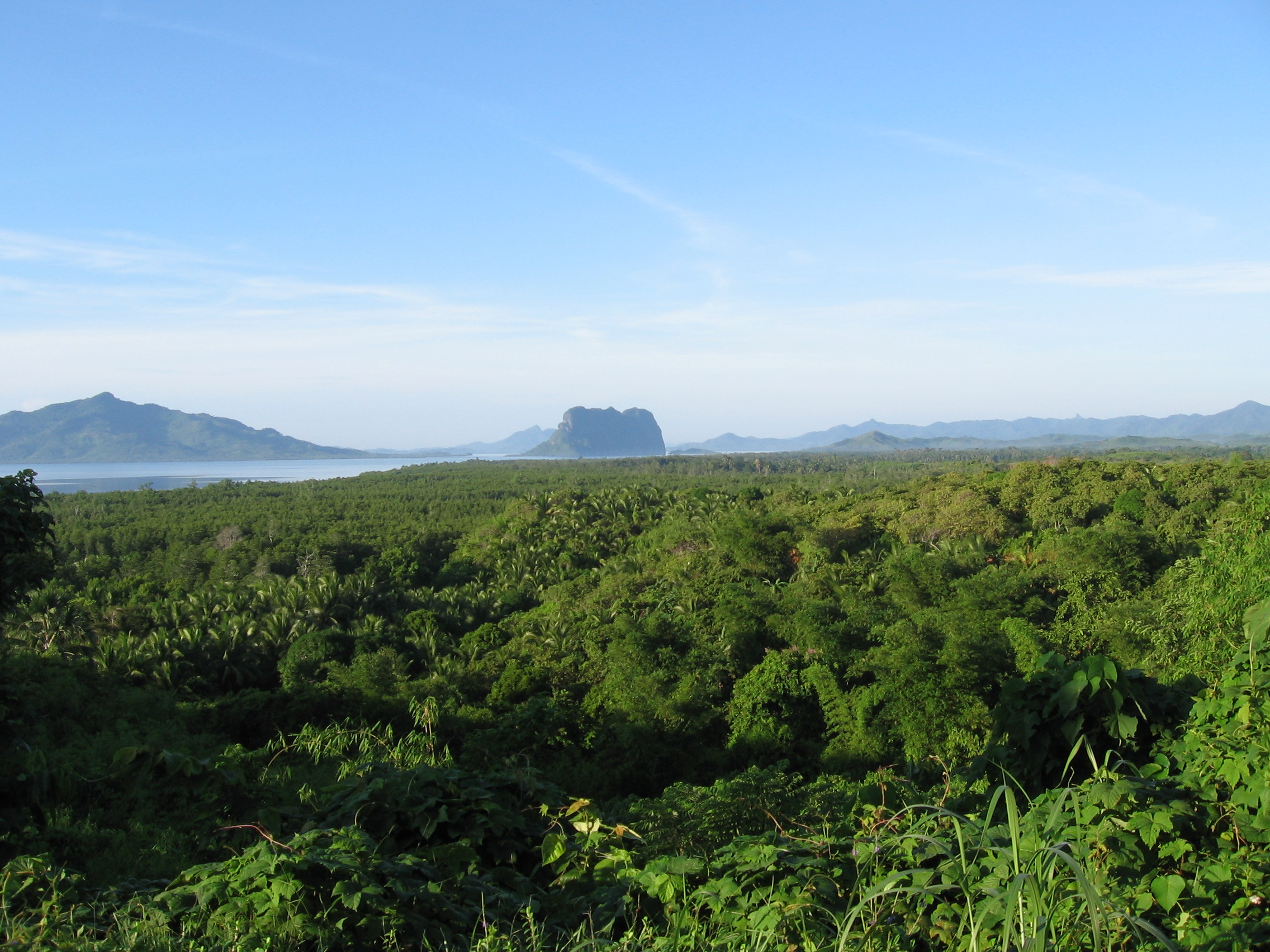
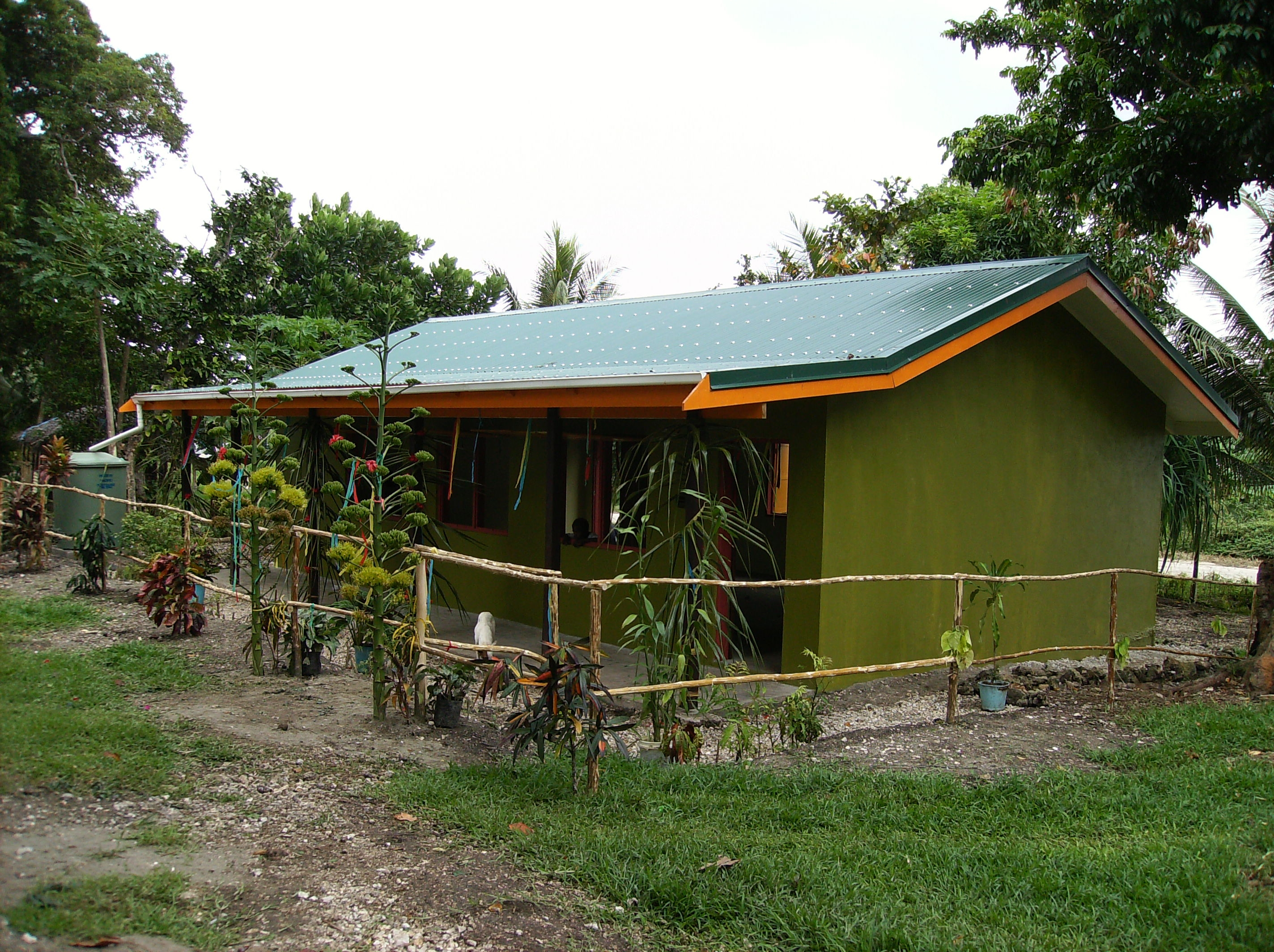
Seacology works to protect habitats on islands around the world in return for services. This mangrove forest in the Philippines (left) was protected in return for new community facilities or services, such as this new community hall in Sanoa Village on the island of Vanuatu (right).

Seacology is a nonprofit organization that works to preserve both island habitats and cultures by exchanging services for local assistance and cooperation with conservation efforts. As of 2000, it was reported to be the only conservation organization to focus entirely on island preservation. Seacology has 501(c)(3) status (providing federal income tax deductions for some American donors) because it is a charitable, non-profit organization. According to its mission statement on its website, "Seacology searches for win-win situations where both the local environment is protected and islanders receive some tangible benefit for doing so."

Islands constitute a large portion of the world's surface. Combined, the largest 125 islands cover an area the size of Europe, and if the economic zones that include marine resources (found within a few miles of shore) are included, islands make up one-sixth of the Earth's surface area and hold half of all marine species. Scientific surveys have shown that coral reefs, which surround many islands, are declining rapidly due to climate change, dynamite and cyanide fishing, and marine pollution. According to evolutionary biologist E. O. Wilson, bird species that are endemic to islands face a greater risk of extinction—40 times greater than on the continents. At least 255 island bird species have become extinct since the appearance of humans, with 158 lost during prehistory and 97 lost between 1600 and 1994. In comparison, between 17 and 20 species of continental birds became extinct between 1600 and 1994. Because the small land area of islands can only support small populations, the biggest threat to endemic wildlife is habitat loss. Other threats include direct exploitation (hunting and pet trade), disease, and invasive species.

To save island habitats around the world, Seacology staff initiate projects by first holding meetings with local villagers to determine their needs. These needs often include schools, a community center, solar energy, or freshwater delivery. Once their needs are determined, Seacology makes a deal with the local community, offering to provide the needed public work in return for a forest reserve or a no-take fishing area around a coral reef. Facilities such as schools and community centers are built using local labor, and Seacology provides approximately $20,000 for supplies and to facilitate the construction. Seacology has field representatives stationed around the world who monitor and report the progress of the projects in their region, as well as seek new projects in their respective regions or islands. New project suggestions are reviewed by the Board of Directors. The Scientific Advisory Board provide additional recommendations, based on the latest research.

In addition to their Seacology projects, Cox, Verne and Marion Read, and Bat Conservation International founder Dr. Merlin Tuttle spurred the creation of the National Park of American Samoa with the United States Congress and American Samoan Governor A. P. Lutali. In 2008, Seacology started its Carbon Offset Fund, where donations of $40.00 went directly towards renewable energy and reforestation projects. That same year, they collaboratively funded the creation of a nursery run by the non-governmental organization (NGO) Azafady in Madagascar to raise 3,000 seedlings of the endangered palm Dypsis saintelucei. The two organizations have also collaborated to protect the Manafiafy Forest in southeastern Madagascar. In Bunaken and Manado, Seacology was involved in testing a new method of restoring coral reef, which involved planting white ceramic modules that were shaped like 3-dimensional snowflakes to maximize the surface area for corals to grow.

=== Projects ===
According to their 2020 Annual Report, Seacology has funded over 300 projects globally. The island communities that have aided in these efforts have collectively received facilities, including schools, community centers, and other important structures. Educational materials, vital medical services, and environmental training have been provided in many programs.

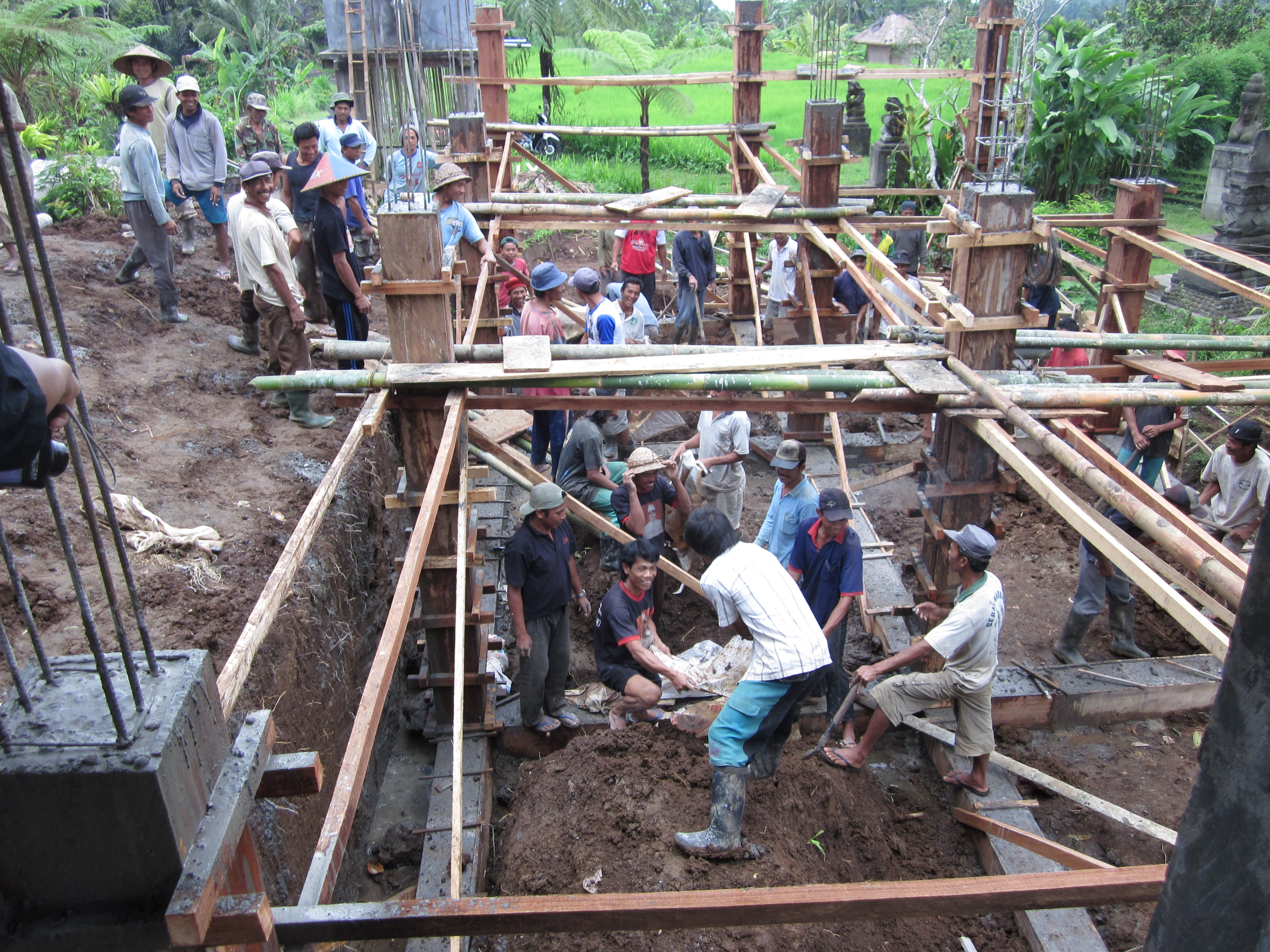
Seacology projects often involve machine-free labor, utilizing the strength and skills of the local community.

When projects are agreed upon with an island community, local rituals often coincide with the start of the project, particularly in the Pacific Islands, where a common custom involves drinking kava, a mildly narcotic drink made from the ground-up root of a pepper plant. The ritual is hundreds of years old, and has been described by the Seacology staff as being relaxing, especially because of the friendly environment. Seacology staff often dress in local attire. The villagers perform dances, and the staff are invited to join in, often to the amusement of the villagers.

When the projects begin, the work is done without machines, with supplies being shipped on small boats and then carried by hand from the beach. Project costs range between $5,000 and $150,000, although the average is between $20,000 and $25,000. The protected areas that result from these deals typically involve a 20- to 30-year commitment. Seacology hopes that during that time the local people grow to respect these resources and ideally progress to a point where they are less dependent on natural resources. According to marine biologist Mark Erdmann, in a worst-case scenario, if the people violate the contract and destroy the habitat, Seacology will have still made a difference in their lives through its low-cost investment, whereas larger conservation organizations might invest large sums of money but through not addressing the immediate needs of the people, if the project fails, both lose that investment and not have helped the community.

In one of Seacology's projects, villagers in Fiji refused a $700,000 offer by foreign businessmen to buy one of the islands and signed an agreement that prohibited development for 20 years and established a 10-year no-take fishing reserve encompassing 80 square miles (210 km^{2}) around the island. On the island of Kendhoo, part of the Baa Atoll in the Maldives, Seacology paid $30,000 in 2003 to build a kindergarten in exchange for a ban on harvesting endangered sea turtle eggs, which the government did not prohibit. In the Trang Province of Thailand, another project helps protect the habitat of seagrass beds and mangrove forest to provide habitat for endangered marine mammals called dugongs (Dugong dugon). In 2003, Seacology and a Chinese organization worked together to form an agreement with the people of Hainan Island where in return for scholarships for nearly 200 middle-school children, the people would stop cutting down the trees around Hainan Bawangling National Nature Reserve, home to one of the rarest primates in the world, the Hainan black crested gibbon (Nomascus nasutus hainanus) and the nearly extinct subspecies of Eld's deer (Panolia eldii) found on Hainan. In a project on Cát Bà Island in Vietnam, the organization helped protect the golden-headed langur, another one of the world's most endangered primates, by paying cash and helping establish exclusive harvesting and fishing rights for the local people in return for their efforts in patrolling the beaches and forests for poachers. In 1999, Seacology began work to establish a new national park around Mt. Angavokely, near Antananarivo in Madagascar. The mountain is home to 120 species of endangered orchids and several medicinal herbs, including Helichrysum gymnocephalum, which is used as an antiseptic and treatment for bronchitis; Secneicia faujasiodides, which is used for healing wounds; Psiadia altissima, which is used to treat eczema; Bryophyllum proliferum, which is used to treat coughing; and Brachylaena ramiflora, which is used to lower malarial fever.

=== Sri Lanka Mangrove Conservation Project ===
In 2015, Seacology launched its largest-ever project, a $3.4 million initiative to protect all of Sri Lanka's remaining mangrove forests and restore many degraded ones. Through Sri Lanka–based NGO Sudeesa (also known as the Small Fishers Federation of Lanka), Seacology is funding a significant expansion of that organization's existing microloan and job-training programs for impoverished coastal women. In exchange, the beneficiaries of these programs must agree to assist in protecting their local mangrove habitats. The training is designed in part to give low-income women in these communities alternatives to harvesting mangroves, a subsistence activity that has contributed to the forests' degradation. The project also established three large nursery facilities to grow several species of mangroves, to be replanted in areas previously cleared for aquaculture and other unsustainable development, as well as several areas destroyed during the Sri Lankan Civil War.

The effort is endorsed by the government of Sri Lanka, which has agreed to assist with demarcating the country's mangroves. The Sri Lankan navy has assisted with the effort to replant mangroves in several deforested areas, and President Maithripala Sirisena has attended several Sudeesa functions, including the opening of a museum funded by the project designed to educate visitors about the mangrove ecosystem's ecological and economic importance. In 2018, the project was named as one of 15 winners of the climate action award given by Momentum For Change, a project of the United Nations Framework Convention on Climate Change. Sri Lanka was also selected by the Commonwealth of Nations to lead a new committee to advise the 53-country organization on best practices for mangrove conservation.

=== Dominican Republic National Mangrove Initiative ===
Following the successes of its first nationwide project, Seacology began considering a similar effort in another island country.

In 2021 the organization officially launched a five-year partnership with local NGO Grupo Jaragua in the Dominican Republic. Similar to the one in Sri Lanka, the initiative focuses on mangrove conservation, but differs in approach by prioritizing environmental education and awareness, and supporting ecotourism and other sustainable livelihood activities.

=== Seacology Prize ===
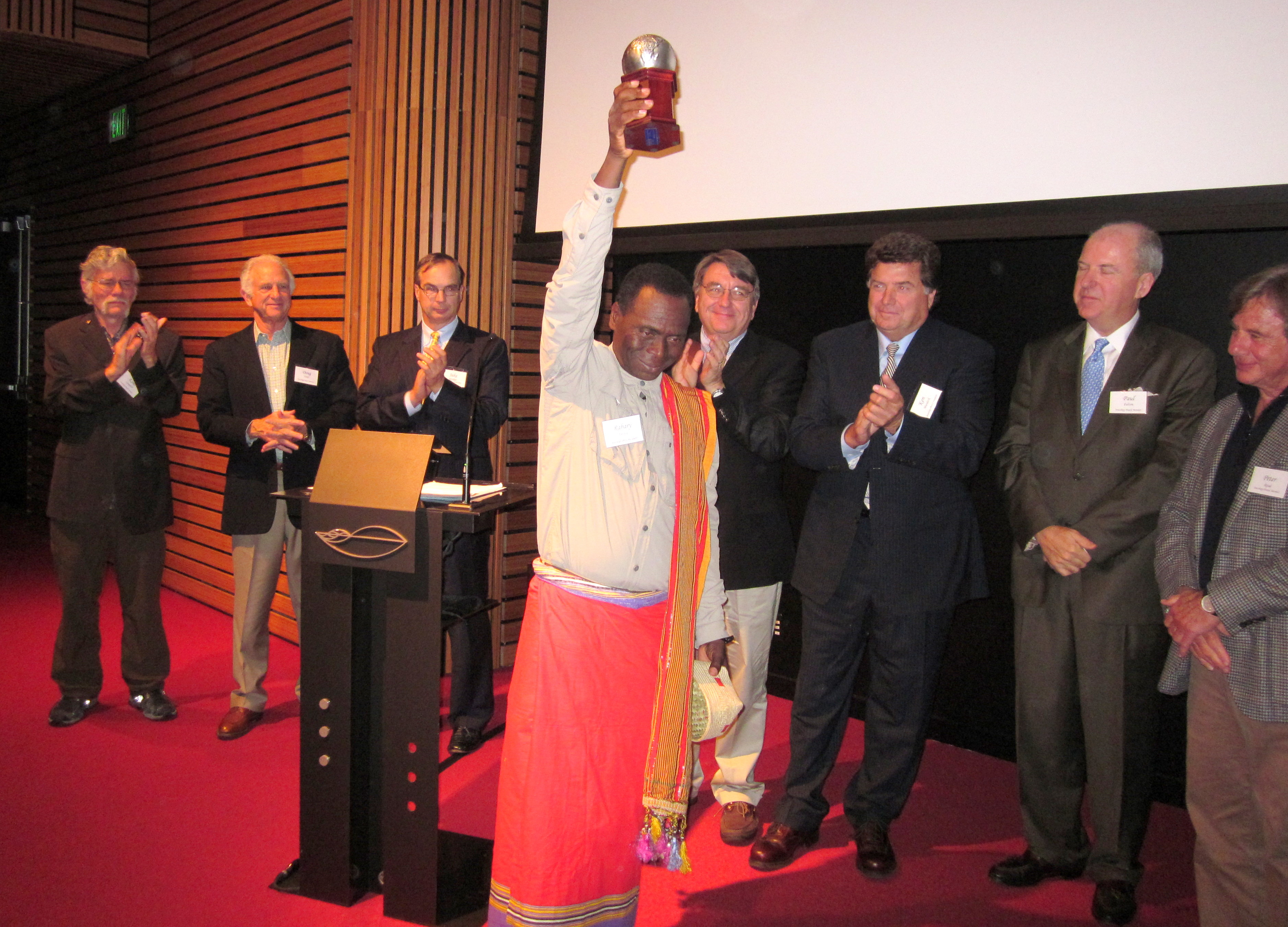
Rabary Desiré of Madagascar was awarded the Seacology Prize in 2010.

Created by founder Cox in 1992 and underwritten by Ken Murdock in honor of his mother, the Seacology Prize is awarded each year to an indigenous islander based on achievements in island conservation and cultural preservation. Many of the award recipients are people who risk their lives and wellbeing to preserve their culture and environment but receive little or no public recognition for their work. The prize includes a reward of $10,000.

In 2010, it was awarded to Rabary Desiré from Matsobe-Sud in Madagascar for his forest conservation efforts in Belaoka Marovato in northeastern Madagascar. Rabary, an ecotour and research guide, had created his own forest reserve, called Antanetiambo (meaning "on the high hill"), and planned to use his prize money to fund reforestation efforts, develop tourist facilities, and expand the reserve. Another winner of the Seacology Prize was the Icelandic filmmaker and former RÚV reporter Ómar Ragnarsson, who won the award in 2008 for his efforts in preserving the highlands of Iceland. In 2017, the prize was awarded to Filipino environmentalist and philanthropist Gina Lopez for her brave battle against multi-million mining corporations in the Philippines, which led to a massive public discourse and perception against mining in island ecosystems.

Winners of the Seacology Prize
Year	Winner	Nationality
1992	Ulu Taufa'asisina Tausaga	Samoa
1993	Fuiono Senio	Samoa
1994	Va'asilifiti Moelagi Jackson	Samoa
1995	A.P. Lutali	American Samoa
1996	Taufa'ahau Tupou IV	Tonga
1997	Mary Thomas	Canada (British Columbia)
1998	Saula Vodonaivalu, Sr.	Fiji
1999	Madison Nena	Federated States of Micronesia (Kosrae)
2000	Edwin "Take" Matsuda	United States (Hawaii)
2000	Doris Matsuda-Saromines	United States (Hawaii)
2001	Anuradha Wickramasinghe	Sri Lanka
2002	Meity Mongdong	Indonesia
2003	Elisabeth Rabakonandrianina	Madagascar
2004	Adrian Lasimbang	Malaysia (Borneo)
2005	Felix Sugirtharaj	India
2005	Patrick Pate	Papua New Guinea
2006	Ketut Sarjana Putra	Indonesia
2007	Kokichi Kariya	Japan
2008	Ómar Ragnarsson	Iceland
2009	Filip Damen	Papua New Guinea
2010	Rabary Desiré	Madagascar
2011	Irman Meilandi	Indonesia
2012	John Aini	Papua New Guinea
2013	Marie Saleem	Maldives
2014	Ali Shaibu Shekue	Kenya
2015	Lakshmi Moorthy	India
2016	Irma Brady	Honduras
2017	Gina Lopez	Philippines
2018	Patricia Lamelas	Dominican Republic
2019	Peter Kallang	Malaysia
2020	Omar Abdallah Juma	Kenya
2021	Saw John Aung Thong	India
2022	Kevin Iro	Cook Islands
2023	Jonah Ratsimbazafy	Madagascar
2024	Mohammed Kolugege	India
2025	Cynthia Ong	Malaysia
2026	Anette Sanford	Dominica

=== Ecotourism ===
In response to the growing demand for ecotourism, Seacology opened up its fundraising expeditions to the public in 2006. These trips include destinations like Fiji, and offer both unusual travel opportunities and a means to help improve the quality of life for the indigenous people. The experiences have been described as "moving" because of the close personal interactions with the local people. Some tours visit locations seldom visited by Westerners. On the tours, Seacology encourages travelers to explore the culture and economy by trying local foods.

Following the 2002 Bali bombings, Silverstein reported that tourism fell by over 90 percent on the island of Bali, mostly due to sensational media reporting. He was in Bali a few days after the attack and reported that he saw little or no risk to tourists in the Muslim villages of the region.

=== Tsunami relief funds ===
Following the 2004 Indian Ocean tsunami, Seacology established a tsunami relief fund to help four impacted communities with which the organization had previously completed projects. Following the model of their projects, the Seacology staff asked the local people what they needed to rebuild their economy and infrastructure. In Kiralakele, Sri Lanka, the people requested fishing nets and boats. The people of Kadachang Village in the Andaman Islands requested goats and chickens. On Kendhoo in the Maldives, the tsunami had destroyed the local plant life, so seedlings were needed in order to restore the environment. In Trang Province, Thailand, basic structural repair was requested. Seacology emphasized that it would repair and replace the projects that had been damaged or destroyed in the tsunami.

As of late 2005, Seacology had raised $261,716 for the relief work, with all of it going directly to fund the efforts. All donors received details of how the money was spent, as well as photos of the work. The California Association of Nonprofits later honored Seacology for the relief work with their Achievement in Innovation Award.

Previous work by Seacology in the region had helped minimize the damage caused by the tsunami. Seacology Prize recipient Anuradha Wickramasinghe from Sri Lanka noted that the mangrove forests that were preserved shielded the community, whereas nearby villages that had cleared their mangroves to create industrial shrimp farms had not fared so well. Mangroves also buffered Kadachang Village in the hard-hit Andaman Islands; the village suffered little loss of human life or structural damage compared to the nation's capital city of Port Blair.

Following the 2009 Samoa tsunami, Seacology once again started a tsunami relief effort. They helped Samoan villages by providing new water tanks and pipelines, and also helped to clean up mangroves and inshore coral reefs that were littered with debris from nearby motels.

== Finances ==
Seacology is a small nonprofit, with only nine full-time staff, and as a result has little overhead costs and operates on a modest budget. Its tax identification number is 87-0495235. According to Silverstein, its annual budget for all of its staff and office expenditures is significantly lower than the median compensation for business chief executive officers (CEOs) alone. Board members receive no compensation and are not reimbursed for the costs of attending board meetings. Unlike other environmental groups, Seacology does not offer memberships, which further reduces its expenditures. Staff answer the phone instead of using automated answering services, and Seacology respects donor privacy and is compliant with the Children's Online Privacy Protection Act (COPPA).

In 2022, Seacology reported $2,971,117 in donations and grants. Its expenses that year totaled $ 2,752,679 with $384,427 going toward fundraising and $155,998 supporting management and other general expenses. Financial support comes mostly from individuals, foundations, and companies such as Nu Skin Enterprises, whose Force for Good Foundation contributes royalties based on sales of plant-based cosmetic formulas Cox developed for Epoch person care products. Board members also contribute a sizable portion of the annual budget, donating a minimum of $10,000 per year to the organization.

== Leadership ==
Seacology is governed by its board of directors, which consists of corporate leaders who share a commitment to island conservation and the preservation of island cultures. Paul Alan Cox is the Chairman of Seacology. He received his PhD from Harvard University, and served as a professor at Brigham Young University, the Swedish University of Agricultural Sciences, Uppsala University, and is current adjunct Professor of Pharmacology at the University of Chicago, and adjunct Professor of Biology at the University of Nevada, Reno. Cox served as the Director of the National Tropical Botanical Garden (NTBG) for seven years, and as of 2011, he is the Executive Director of the Institute for Ethnomedicine. His research interests include island plant ecology and ethnobotany of island cultures, and he has published more than 225 scientific papers and reviews. For his research on new medicinal plants, he was named one of eleven "Heroes of Medicine" by Time magazine. Cox is an advocate of indigenous peoples, and can speak a variety of island languages.

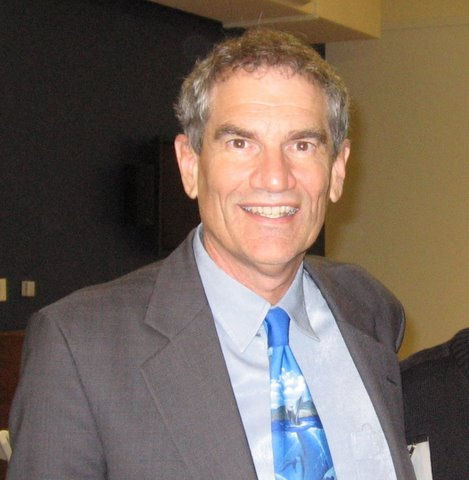
Duane Silverstein joined Seacology in 1999 as the Executive Director.

The Executive Director of Seacology is Duane Silverstein, who for 18 years prior to joining the organization acted as the Executive Director of the Goldman Fund and headed the Goldman Environmental Prize. He has written articles that have appeared in Asian Geographic as well as various scuba diving magazines, and he is a National Fellow of The Explorers Club. Silverstein has met with heads of state around the world, including several presidents of the United States, as well as several Secretaries-General of the United Nations. In addition to having his work covered in newspapers and periodicals, including Time magazine, the Bangkok Post, and the San Francisco Chronicle, he was also selected as an "All-Stars Among Us" in People magazine, for which he was honored at the 2009 Major League Baseball All-Star Game. In 2008, Silverstein and Seacology were briefly featured alongside several organizations in the music video for "What About Now" by the American rock band Daughtry. In 2010, Silverstein was awarded one of the Jefferson Awards for Public Service and also was given the 2010 Coastal Hero Award by Sunset magazine.

The vice chair of Seacology is Ken Murdock, who also founded the herbal company Nature's Way after his mother was cured of a serious illness with an herbal medicine. Murdock played a key role in the creation of Seacology, and Nature's Way covered Seacology's administrative costs for three years. Murdock has volunteered in Samoa, during which time he resided on Manu'a and learned the local language.

The Scientific Advisory Board of Seacology includes island biodiversity specialists, whose research focuses on the conservation of oceanic and terrestrial island ecosystems. The Scientific Advisory Board generates recommendations for new conservation projects based on the latest research available. Among the members are researcher and Pulitzer Prize winner Jared Diamond, entomologist and oceanographer Sylvia Earle, and prior to his death, evolutionary biologist E. O. Wilson. As the founder of Seacology, Cox is also a member of the advisory board.

Job-search website Talentdesk ranked Seacology the fourth-best American nonprofit organization to work for in 2018.
