= Duane Silverstein =

American businessman

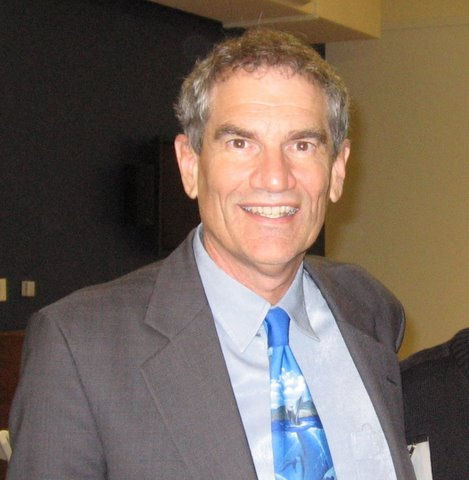
- Known for: Executive Director of Seacology

Duane Silverstein is an American businessman who currently serves as the Executive Director of Seacology, a nonprofit organization based in Berkeley, California. Silverstein holds a B.A. degree from the University of New York at Stony Brook. Later Silverstein also graduated from the University of California at Berkeley, receiving a M.A. degree. Silverstein was born in November 1952.

== History ==
Prior to heading Seacology, Silverstein served as Executive Director of the Goldman Fund, a San Francisco based philanthropic foundation. During his 18 years tenure at Goldman Fund, Silverstein oversaw the Goldman Environmental Prize.

Seacology operated as a volunteer-only organization until 1999 when Silverstein was brought on as its first employee and the group's headquarters was relocated to Berkeley, not far from his residence. For more than two decades he has served as Executive Director of the organization, which seeks to preserve island ecosystems, endemic species, and local cultures.

In the course of his work, Silverstein has traveled to 184 islands in 74 countries.

== Awards and recognition ==
In 2009, Silverstein was selected as an "All-Star Among Us" and honored at Major League Baseball’s All-Star Game. Silverstein was a 2010 recipient of the Jefferson Award for Public Service in the San Francisco Bay area.

Having worked in island and marine conservation for 30 years, Silverstein has authored 30 articles for newspapers and magazines such as: Asian Geographic, Fathoms, Ocean Geographic, the Oakland Tribune, and other publications. He has appeared in Scuba Diving Magazine, the Divers Alert Network, and the San Francisco Chronicle. In 2022, Scuba Diving Magazine named Silverstein a recipient of its Sea Hero Award.

During Silverstein's tenure as executive director, Seacology has won various awards including the United Nations Climate Secretariat's Momentum for Change climate action award. On behalf of Seacology, he received the Prince Albert II of Monaco Laureate for Outstanding Innovation in 2015. While serving as executive director of Seacology, the non-profit was nominated for the 2020 Nobel Peace Prize. In 2024 in a ceremony at the Wharton School of Business on behalf of Seacology, Silverstein accepted the $250,000 Lipman Family Prize for outstanding vision, inspiration and impact.
