= Chinese National Geography =

Chinese monthly magazine

- June 2008 issue front cover of the magazine
- Editor: Li Shuanke (李栓科)
- Categories: Geography; Science; Culture; History; Archaeology; Society; Nature; Environment; Conservation; Exploration
- Frequency: Monthly for the Chinese edition; bi-monthly for the international English edition
- Founded: 1949
- First issue: January 1950
- Company: Chinese National Geography Press
- Country: China
- Language: Chinese (simplified and traditional); English
- Website: (Chinese edition) www.dili360.com (English international edition) www.cngint.com
- ISSN: 1009-6337

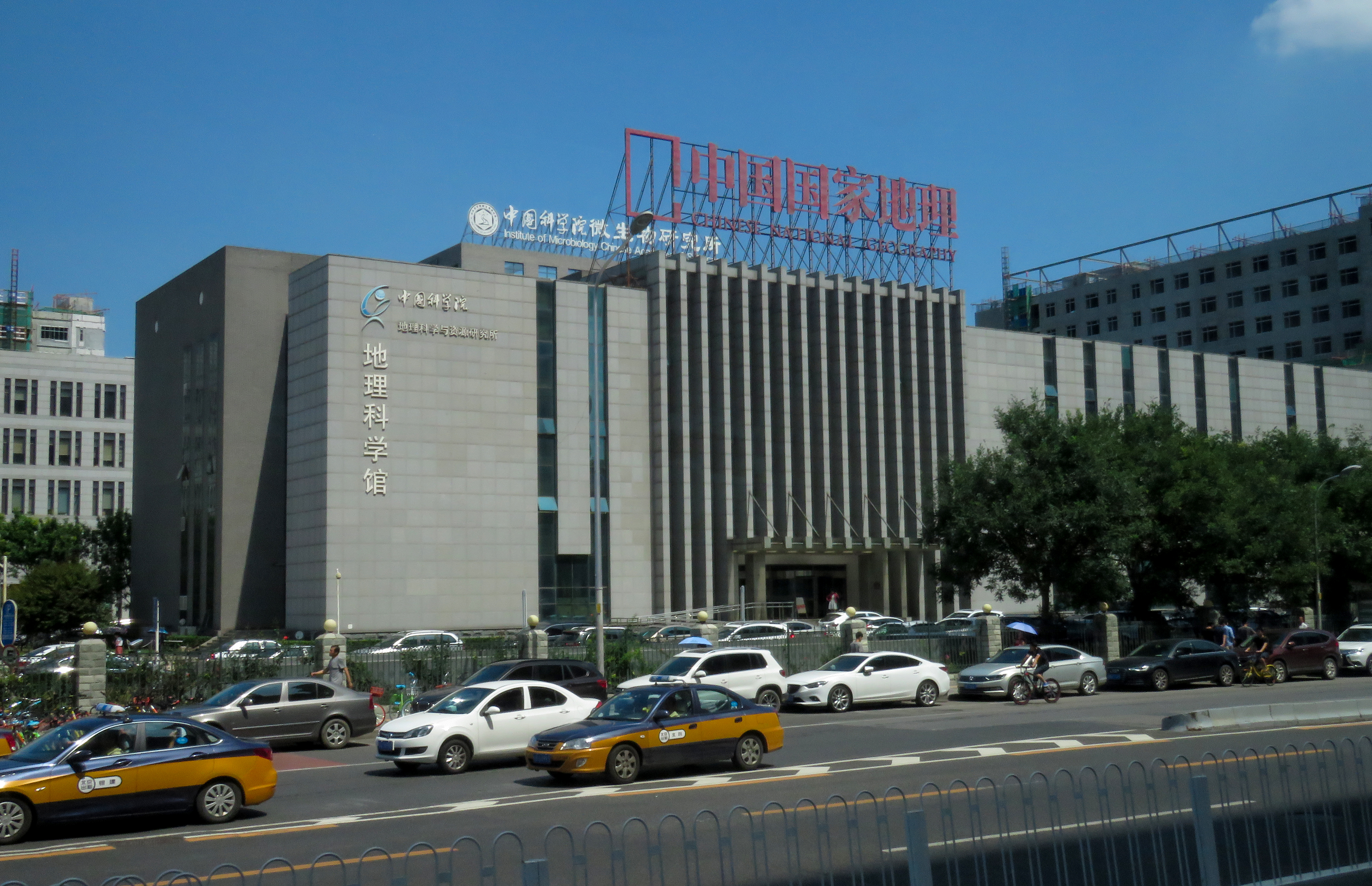
Headquarters of Chinese National Geography at the Institute of Geographic Sciences and Natural Resources Research, CAS in Beijing

Chinese National Geography (Chinese: 中国国家地理; pinyin: Zhōngguó Guójiā Dìlǐ) is a Chinese monthly magazine similar to the National Geographic Magazine. Founded in 1949 in China, the magazine has revamped itself several times, and is now a popular magazine in mainland China. There is also an edition in traditional Chinese for readers in Hong Kong and Taiwan.

== History ==
Founded by a group of teachers with a keen interest in geography in 1949, the original Chinese edition was first published in January 1950 under the name Dili Zhishi (Knowledge of Geography; Chinese: 《地理知识》). The magazine focused on delivering scientific and geographical concepts. At first only 600 copies were printed, but the publication quickly became popular, and soon 2,000 copies of each volume were being printed.

From August–December 1960, Dili Zhishi temporarily stopped publication. It reformed itself and resumed publication in January 1961 under a new name, Dili (Geography; Chinese: 《地理》). However, this new version was not successful with its readers, and the title was changed back to Dili Zhishi in 1966. However, the magazine was forced to stop publication with the Cultural Revolution in China.

Six years later in 1972, the magazine was able to resume publication, and its circulation reached 400,000. Each copy contained 32 pages.

The magazine was printed in color from 1993 onwards. Starting from 1998, the magazine revamped itself to provide more appealing content with the aim of reaching out to more readers both within and outside of China. In 2000 it was renamed Chinese National Geography.

== Language editions ==
The magazine has launched editions in English, Japanese (the Japanese version is now discontinued) and traditional Chinese. According to an interview with publisher Li Shuanke in the May 2009 issue of the English edition, there are plans to launch the magazine in French, German and other languages.

CNGi cover (May 2009)
Launch issue on Henan province, the cradle of Chinese civilization.

== See also ==
- National Geographic Magazine
- ASIAN Geographic Magazine
