= Helichrysum gymnocephalum =

Scientific classification
- Kingdom: Plantae
- Clade: Tracheophytes
- Clade: Angiosperms
- Clade: Eudicots
- Clade: Asterids
- Order: Asterales
- Family: Asteraceae
- Genus: Helichrysum
- Species: H. gymnocephalum

Binomial name
- Helichrysum gymnocephalum (DC.) Humb.

Species of flowering plant

Helichrysum gymnocephalum is a species of flowering plant in the family Asteraceae found in Madagascar. It is used locally for its alleged aphrodisiac, antiseptic, and stimulant properties, and also as a treatment for bronchitis. The essential oil is sold internationally for these same purposes. This oil mostly consists of 1,8-Cineole, the organic compound Eucalyptol, which may account for these properties.

In 1999, the non-profit organization Seacology helped to preserve this and other plants by creating a national park around Mt. Angavokely, near Antananarivo in Madagascar.
