= Fuiono Senio =

Samoan chief (died 1997)

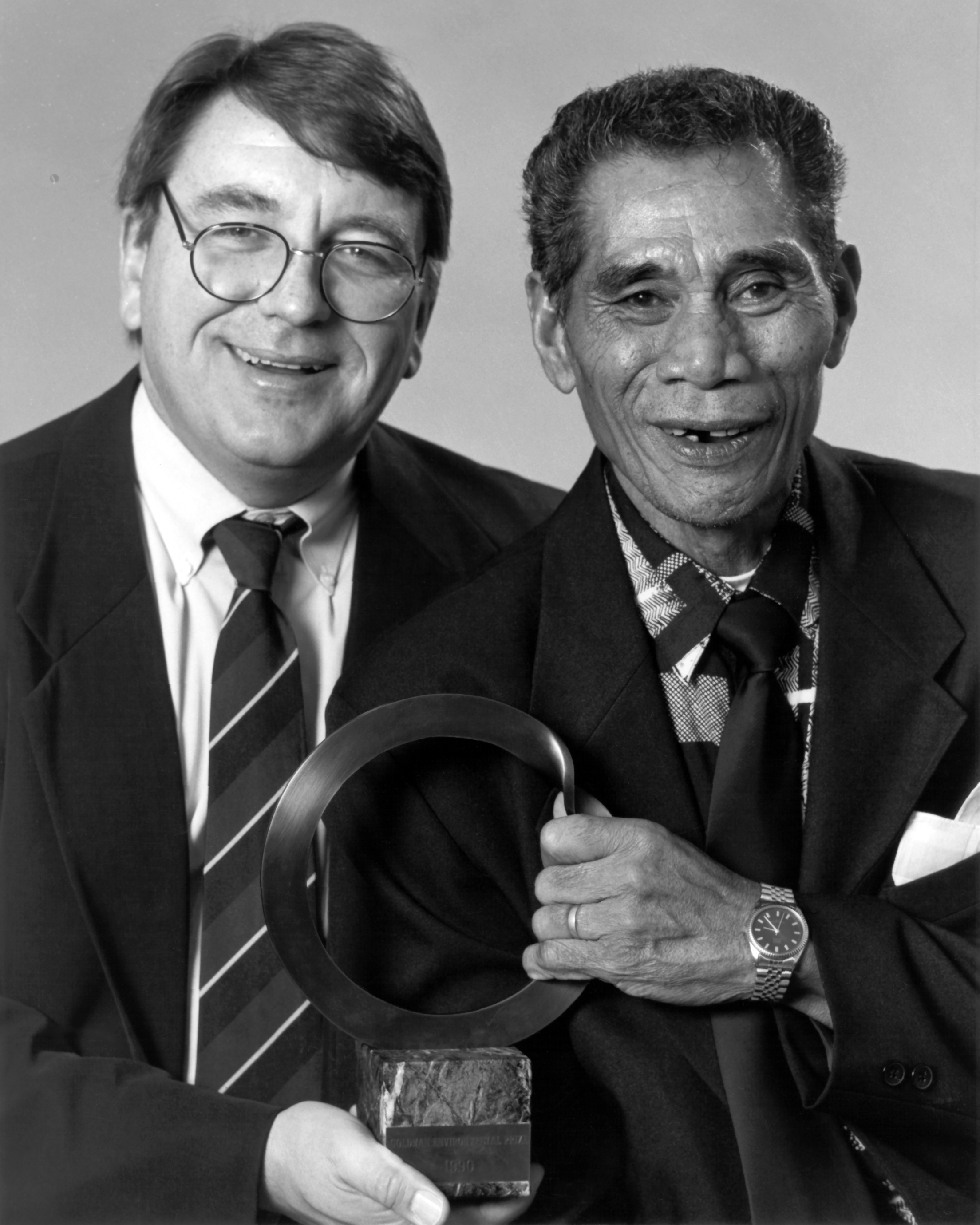
- Senio (right) and ethnobiologist Paul Alan Cox won the 1997 Goldman Environmental Prize for their conservation efforts at Falealupo in Samoa. Their work later led to the founding of Seacology.
- Died: 17 May 1997
- Occupations: Chief and environmentalist
- Awards: Goldman Environmental Prize (1997)

Fuiono Senio (died 17 May 1997) was a chief and environmentalist from Falealupo village on the island of Savai'i in Western Samoa.

A logging company offered funds to the Samoan government to build a school for Senio's village if they could log the rainforest nearby. As the loggers were about to start work, a visiting biologist offered to raise funds if logging stopped. The village elders agreed to accept the offer and set aside the rainforest from the coast to the interior ridge of Savai'i, as a rainforest preserve. The loggers returned, and Senio ran in front of them and threatened them with a machete, telling them to go away. This act became well known throughout the South Pacific, where similar problems affected many poor island communities.

He was awarded the Goldman Environmental Prize in 1997, shared with Paul Alan Cox, for their contributions to the protection of rainforests of Falealupo.

He died of liver cancer a month after receiving the Goldman prize.
