= AIDS Research Alliance =

Defunct U.S. organization

AIDS Research Alliance of America
- Founded: 1989
- Location: Los Angeles, California
- Region served: United States
- Key people: Carolyn H. Carlburg, J.D., Chief Executive Officer Stephen J. Brown, M.D., Medical Director
- Website: AIDS Research Alliance: Home

AIDS Research Alliance of America (ARAA) was a national community-based 501(c)(3) non-profit medical research institution that sought to develop a cure for HIV/AIDS, medical strategies to prevent new HIV infections and better treatments for people living with HIV/AIDS. From 1989 to 2015, ARAA conducted over 150 clinical and pre-clinical studies, ranging from alternative therapies that employed a complementary approach to HIV care to the first in-human HIV vaccine trial. AIDS Research Alliance was partly responsible for "fast-tracking" to market half of today's anti-HIV treatments.

== History ==
In 1989, a group of Southern California physicians and philanthropists, led by Paul Joseph Rothman, M.D. and Matthew Rushton, Hollywood film producer of Mrs. Doubtfire, founded Search Alliance to speed the discovery and development of effective treatments against HIV and its complications.

Working with physicians who were experimenting with potential treatments in their private practices, the organization pooled data and identified promising experimental regimens. The staff designed the studies, coordinated the data collection of Alliance physicians, and analyzed and published the results.

In 1995, Search Alliance changed its name to AIDS Research Alliance of America and centralized all research activities in one licensed facility based in Los Angeles. This allowed ARAA to identify and manage scientific, clinical and organizational strategies with a staff of dedicated research professionals, while maintaining affiliations with physicians, academics and scientists in research institutions around the world.

In 2009, ARAA relocated from West Hollywood, where it had been located for 14 years, to a larger research facility in downtown Los Angeles.

As a community-based organization, ARAA served as a bridge between communities at risk of HIV and government-funded research. It collaborated with government-sponsored researchers and pharmaceutical companies, but also advocated for and conducted research that was not driven by the demand for profitability. ARAA was licensed by the National Institutes of Health (NIH) to develop a drug to combat HIV - prostratin. Carolyn H. Carlburg, J.D. was the last Executive Director and Chief Executive Officer, and Stephen J. Brown, M.D. was the Medical Director.

== Research ==
AIDS Research Alliance of America focused its research and development program on several core areas, including the clinical trials of anti-HIV drugs that inhibited the virus in novel ways, and new medical strategies – like microbicides and vaccines – that prevented the spread of HIV. ARAA conducted clinical trials aimed at treating the medical disorders that accompany HIV, including HIV-associated lipodystrophy, diarrhea and neuropathy. Developing strategies that eliminated HIV viral reservoirs became a major research initiative of ARAA. This included its work on prostratin, a potential reservoir ablative agent that ARAA had in-licensed from NIH. In 2008, ARAA filed a new patent on prostratin and its analogues, thus broadening its research platform targeting the HIV reservoirs.

== Funding ==
AIDS Research Alliance of America funded its research by using a business model that included contract research as well as tax-deductible donations from private individuals, corporations and foundations. ARAA conducted clinical trials for major pharmaceutical sponsors including Pfizer, Merck, Theratechnologies, Schering-Plough, Tibotec, NeurogesX, National Institutes of Health, Serono, Bristol-Myers Squibb, Agouron, GlaxoSmithKline, Orasure Technologies, Gilead Sciences, and many others.

Funders and partners to ARAA included The Ahmanson Foundation, Capital Group Companies, City of West Hollywood, Concord Music Group, David Michod, Douglas MacBride Kinney, Entertainment AIDS Alliance, The Joseph Drown Foundation, Kaiser Permanente, MacHeist, The MacDonald Family Foundation, The Pepsi Refresh Project, The Silva Watson Moon Walk Fund, The University Wide AIDS Research Program [the University of California], the Division of AIDS [NIH], Until There is a Cure, and many others.

ARAA participated each year in the Combined Federal Campaign, as part of the Medical Research Charities Federation and received high ratings from the American Institute of Philanthropy and Charity Navigator. ARAA hosted a number of fundraising events – including ArtSeen featuring A Taste of Los Angeles and was a beneficiary of events like Macy's Passport In-Store, Spinning Nation and the Game Show Congress.

ARAA previously earned three and four-star ratings from Charity Navigator for exceeding or meeting industry standards and performing as well as or better than most charities in its space.
