= Paul Alan Cox =

American ethnobotanist

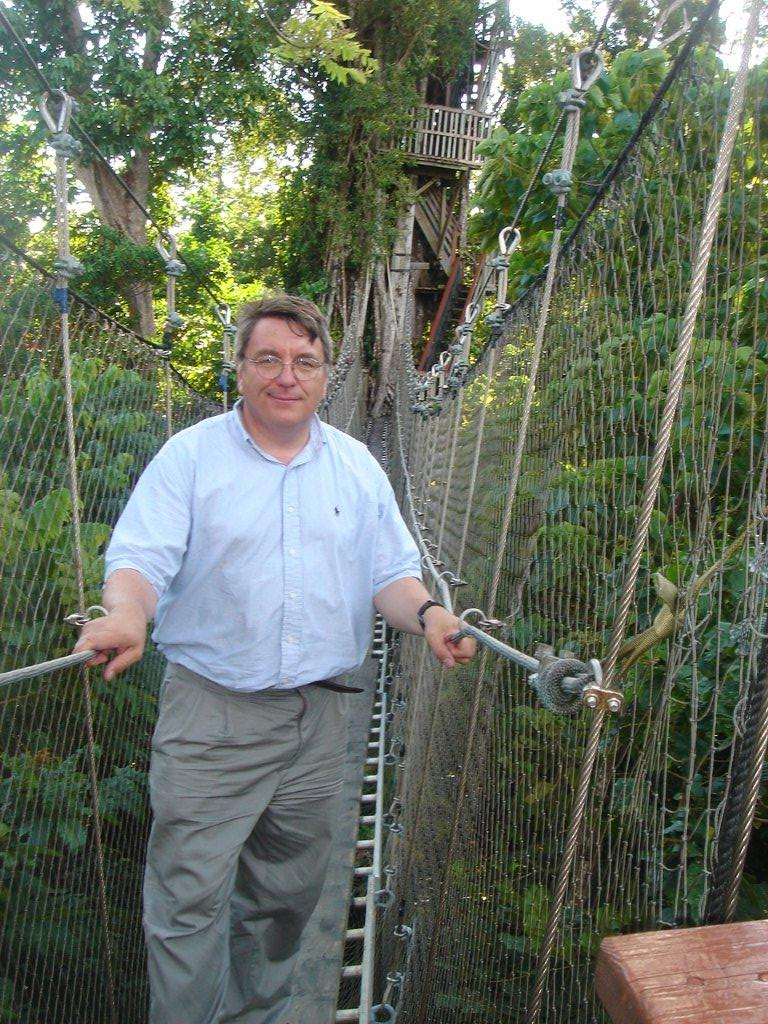
- Cox in Falealupo, Samoa
- Born: Salt Lake City, Utah
- Occupation: Ethnobotanist
- Known for: Founder of Seacology

Paul Alan Cox (born 1953) is an American ethnobotanist whose scientific research focuses on discovering new medicines by studying patterns of wellness and illness among indigenous peoples.

== Early life ==
Cox was born in Salt Lake City in 1953.

After receiving his B.S. in Botany and Philosophy from Brigham Young University, he was awarded a Fulbright Fellowship to read for his M.Sc. in Ecology at the University of Wales at Bangor. He received a Danforth Fellowship and a National Science Foundation Graduate Fellowship for his Ph.D. studies at Harvard University in Biology where, twice, he was awarded the Bowdoin Prize, a distinction he shares with Ralph Waldo Emerson. He was appointed as a Miller Fellow at the Miller Institute for Basic Research in Science at the University of California, Berkeley and as a University of Melbourne Research Fellow in Australia. Early in his academic career he was named a National Science Foundation Presidential Young Investigator by Ronald Reagan, and used the research funds to pursue his interests in mathematical biology and ethnobotany.

== Career ==
After serving as professor and dean at Brigham Young University he became the first King Carl XVI Gustaf Professor of Environmental Science at the Swedish Agricultural University and the Uppsala University, a visiting professorship established by the Swedish Royal Academy of Sciences.

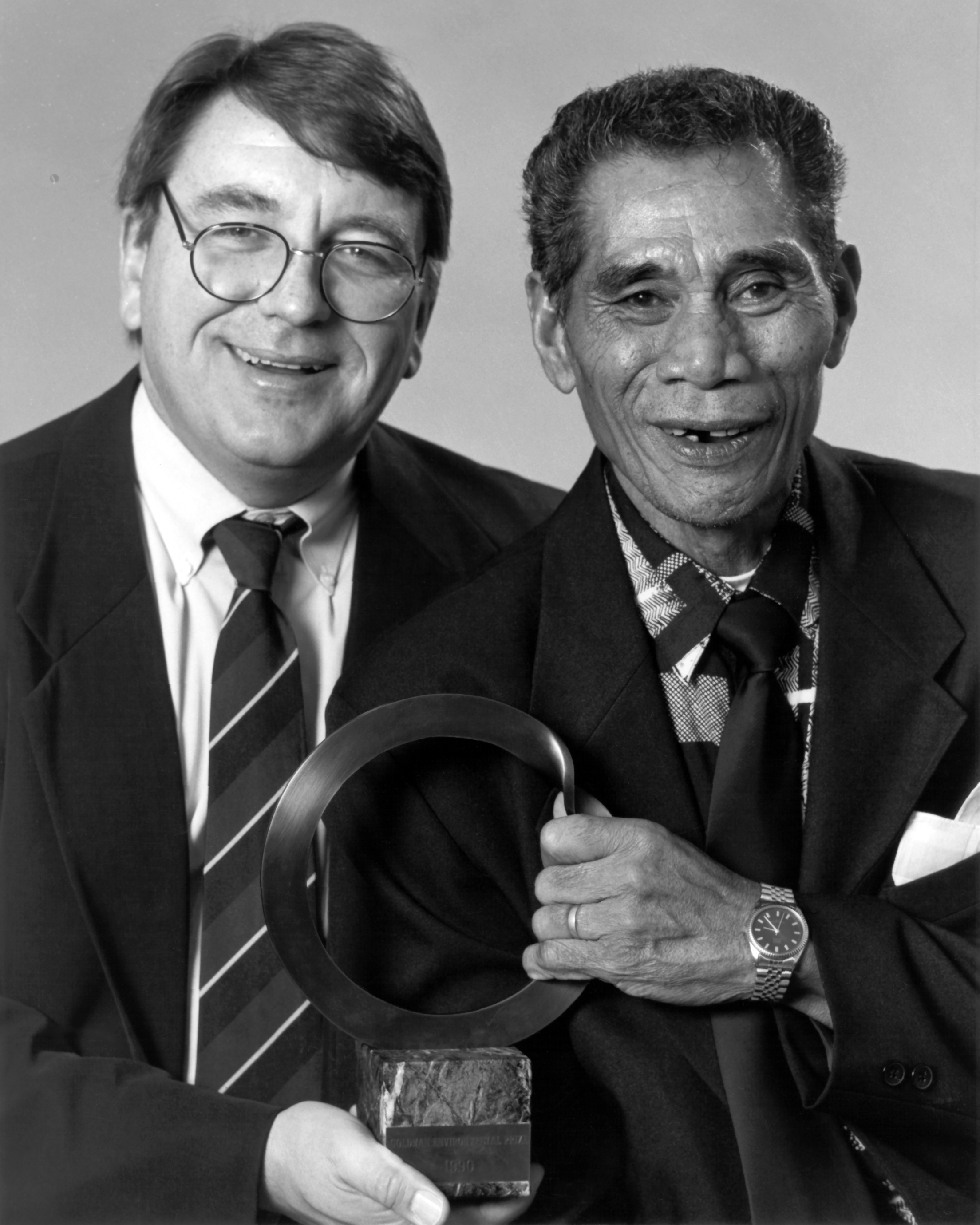
Cox (left) and village chief Fuiono Senio (right) won the Goldman Environmental Prize in 1997 for their conservation efforts at Falealupo in Western Samoa

For seven years he was director of the Congressionally chartered National Tropical Botanical Garden (NTBG) in Hawaii and Florida. Currently, he is executive director of the Brain Chemistry Labs, in Jackson Hole, Wyoming.

He is the author of over 250 scientific papers, reviews, and books and was chosen by Time magazine as one of eleven "Heroes of Medicine" in 1997 for his search for new medicines from plants.

== Evolutionary ecology ==
Cox began his research in evolutionary ecology as a student of John L. Harper at the University of Wales in Bangor by studying dioecy in plants. At Harvard University where he served for four years as Teaching Fellow for E. O. Wilson, he studied how vertebrate pollination influenced breeding system evolution in tropical lianas. Collaborating at Harvard with tropical botanist P. B. Tomlinson, at Berkeley with Herbert G. Baker, and Melbourne with Bruce Knox, he used mathematical search theory to analyze seagrass pollination and later, with mathematician James Sethian used search theory to develop a new approach to the evolution of different size sperm and eggs, known as anisogamy, a topic he continued to pursue with Japanese biologist Tatsuya Togashi. He discovered with colleagues Sandra Banack and James Metcalf in cyanobacteria AEG, a hypothesized backbone of peptide nucleic acids in the pre-RNA world early in the earth's history. They are studying possible health consequences of exposure to isomers of AEG and other cyanobacterial toxins, including beta-Methylamino-L-alanine (BMAA).

== Ethnobotany ==
Although trained in evolutionary ecology, because of his fluency in Polynesian languages, Cox was encouraged by Harvard Professor Richard Evans Schultes to pursue ethnobotanical studies. He became increasingly focused on ethnomedicine after his mother died from breast cancer. Subsequently, with his colleagues Gordon Cragg, Michael Boyd, and others at the National Cancer Institute, they discovered the anti-HIV/AIDS properties of prostratin found in the bark of the mamala tree of Samoa. He was elected as president of the Society for Economic Botany and has been president of the International Society for Ethnopharmacology. Together with Michael Balick, he wrote, Plants, People, and Culture: The Science of Ethnobotany., and for his ethnobotanical studies was awarded the E. K. Janaki Ammal Medal from India, and the Eloise Payne Luquer Medal by the Garden Club of America, which made him a lifetime Honorary Member. He is a foreign member of the Royal Swedish Academy of Agriculture and Forestry, a Fellow of the Linnean Society of London, and appointed adjunct professor at the Xishuangbanna Tropical Botanical Garden by the Chinese Academy of Sciences and at the College of Pharmacy by the University of Illinois, Chicago. Currently, he is searching for a cure for ALS, Alzheimer's, and other tangle diseases.

== Conservation ==
In 1997, he received the Goldman Environmental Prize for the conservation efforts described in his book, Nafanua: Saving the Samoan Rainforest (New York: W.H. Freeman), which has been translated into German, Japanese, and Samoan. He speaks a variety of island languages and is internationally renowned for his advocacy of indigenous peoples. Cox lived with his family in the village of Falealupo on Savai'i island in Samoa where he helped create a covenant with chiefs to protect their lowland rainforest from logging. In 1988, he was bestowed the Nafanua matai chief title by Falealupo, one of the highest legendary titles in Samoa, in honor of his conservation efforts.

Cox founded the environmental nonprofit organization, Seacology, located in Berkeley, California, which has preserved over 1.5 million acres of island forests and coral reefs, and was named a Laureate for the Prince's Prize for Innovative Philanthropy in 2015 by Albert II, Prince of Monaco.

At the request of Governor Scott M. Mattheson, Cox helped defeat the MX missile project proposed for Utah and Nevada, led the successful effort to establish the 50th U.S. National Park, The National Park of American Samoa, and was a delegate to the Convention on International Trade in Endangered Species (CITES) in Lausanne, Switzerland to protect flying fox species in Pacific islands.

== Faith ==
As a member of the Church of Jesus Christ of Latter-day Saints, Cox emerged as a prominent voice for biological conservation. He served a mission in Samoa and is active in his church.

== Bibliography ==
- Cox, Paul Alan (2005-06-02). Introduction. OUP Oxford. pp. xv–xxv. ISBN 9780198569343., in Linnaeus (2003)
- Linnaeus, Carl (2003) [1751 Stockholm]. Linnaeus' Philosophia botanica. trans. Stephen Freer. Oxford: Oxford University Press. ISBN 9780198569343.
