= Scuba Diver AustralAsia =

- Categories: Scuba magazine
- Frequency: 8 issues annually (once every 45 days)
- Founded: 1979
- Company: Asian Geographic Magazines Pte Ltd
- Country: Singapore
- Language: English
- Website: www.scubadiveraa.com
- ISSN: 0729-5529

Scuba Diver AustralAsia is a scuba magazine dedicated to underwater pursuits in the Asia Pacific region. The official publication of the PADI Diving Society in the region, Scuba Diver AustralAsia features stories on destinations, new equipment, the environment and marine science, interviews with iconic figures and underwater photography.

The title was first published in 1979 under the name Scuba Diver. In 2000, it was renamed Scuba Diver AustralAsia. The magazine is now published once every 45 days (eight issues per year).

As of April 2009, the magazine has a readership of 90,000 across 48 countries. It is published by Asian Geographic Magazines Pte Ltd, which also publishes Asian Diver and ASIAN Geographic, a regional geographic magazine.

Scuba Diver AustralAsia organises dive expeditions, underwater photography workshops and photographic competitions on a regular basis.

== See also ==
- ASIAN Geographic Magazine
- Scuba magazine
