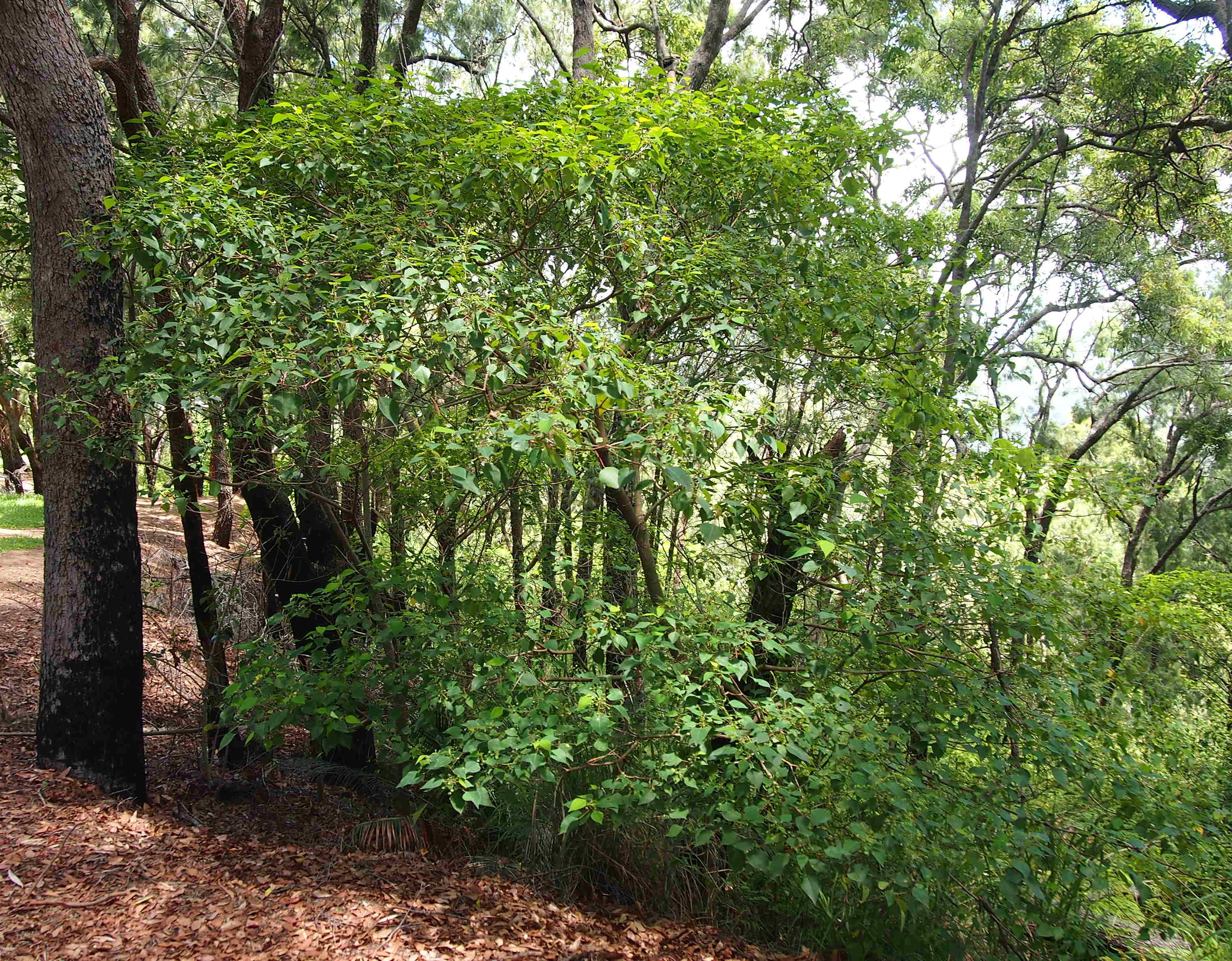

Conservation status
- Least Concern (IUCN 3.1)

Scientific classification
- Kingdom: Plantae
- Clade: Embryophytes
- Clade: Tracheophytes
- Clade: Spermatophytes
- Clade: Angiosperms
- Clade: Eudicots
- Clade: Rosids
- Order: Malpighiales
- Family: Euphorbiaceae
- Genus: Homalanthus
- Species: H. nutans

Binomial name
- Homalanthus nutans (G. Forst.) Guill.

Synonyms
- Carumbium moerenhoutianum Müll.Arg.; Carumbium nutans (G.Forst.) Müll.Arg.; Carumbium pedicellatum (Benth.) Miq.; Croton nutans G.Forst.; Homalanthus gracilis H.St.John; Homalanthus moerenhoutianus (Müll.Arg.) Benth. & Hook.f. ex Drake; Homalanthus pedicellatus Benth.; Homalanthus populifolius; Seborium nutans (G.Forst.) Raf.; Stillingia nutans (G.Forst.) Geiseler

= Homalanthus nutans =

Species of plant

Homalanthus nutans, known locally as the mamala tree, is a species of plant in the family Euphorbiaceae. In Australia it is known as the bleeding heart and the Queensland poplar.

Samoan healers use the tree's bark in a concoction made to treat hepatitis. Research has indicated that a chemical from the bark called prostratin has in vitro activity against HIV.

== Description ==
Homalanthus nutans is a small tree or bushy shrub up to 5 m (16 ft) tall. The trunk has fairly smooth, greyish-brown bark. The rather stout branches are green or reddish, and the twigs exude a white, milky sap when damaged. The alternately arranged leaves have a pair of small stipules at the base of the long petiole, which is often a reddish colour. The leaf blade is hairless, heart-shaped or triangular, 7 to 12 cm (3 to 5 in) long by 6 to 8 cm (2.4 to 3.1 in) wide, with a smooth, untoothed margin. The underside is often greyish and mature leaves turn red as they age. The inflorescence is a terminal yellowish-green spike, the male and female flowers being separate. The male flowers are small and petal-less, with globose anthers. The few female flowers, near the base of the spike, are also without petals, and have a pair of short styles. The female flowers are followed by capsules about 1 cm (0.4 in) long, with two compartments, the seeds being partially enclosed by a fleshy aril.

== Distribution and habitat ==
Homalanthus nutans is native to various tropical Pacific islands: the Caroline Islands, the Cook Islands, Fiji, New Caledonia, Niue, Samoa, the Society Islands, Tonga, Tubuai Island, Vanuatu and Wallis and Futuna. It also grows in northeastern Australia, in Queensland and the coastal strip of New South Wales at altitudes of up to 500 m (1,600 ft). The seeds have a long dormancy period, but germinate readily when the conditions are suitable, such as when the previously shady forest floor becomes illuminated by direct sunlight. It is a pioneer species, found in woodland and on roadside verges, readily colonising disturbed ground.

== Ecology ==
The fruits of Homalanthus nutans are attractive to birds, including the brown cuckoo-dove, the silvereye, Lewin's honeyeater, bowerbirds and currawongs. In Samoa, the plant has a number of uses in traditional medicine. An extract from the bark is used against hepatitis, and freshly crushed leaves are used to control bleeding. Modern research confirms the plant's pharmacological activity, with the anti-HIV drug prostratin having been isolated from the plant.
