= Prostratin =

Names
- Preferred IUPAC name (1aR,1bS,4aR,7aS,7bR,8R,9aS)-4a,7b-Dihydroxy-3-(hydroxymethyl)-1,1,6,8-tetramethyl-5-oxo-1,1a,1b,4,4a,5,7a,7b,8,9-decahydro-9aH-cyclopropa[3,4]benzo[1,2-e]azulen-9a-yl acetate
- Other names 12-Deoxyphorbol-13-acetate

Identifiers
CAS Number	60857-08-1
3D model (JSmol)	Interactive image
ChEMBL	ChEMBL170518
ChemSpider	399975
PubChem CID	454217
UNII	KO94U6DIQ6
CompTox Dashboard (EPA)	DTXSID10893788
- InChI: InChI=1S/C22H30O6/c1-11-6-16-20(26,18(11)25)9-14(10-23)7-15-17-19(4,5)21(17,28-13(3)24)8-12(2)22(15,16)27/h6-7,12,15-17,23,26-27H,8-10H2,1-5H3/t12-,15+,16-,17-,20-,21+,22-/m1/s1 Key: BOJKFRKNLSCGHY-HXGSDTCMSA-N; InChI=1/C22H30O6/c1-11-6-16-20(26,18(11)25)9-14(10-23)7-15-17-19(4,5)21(17,28-13(3)24)8-12(2)22(15,16)27/h6-7,12,15-17,23,26-27H,8-10H2,1-5H3/t12-,15+,16-,17-,20-,21+,22-/m1/s1 Key: BOJKFRKNLSCGHY-HXGSDTCMBJ
- SMILES: O=C1\C(=C/[C@H]2[C@]3(O)[C@@H](/C=C(/CO)C[C@]12O)[C@H]4[C@@](OC(=O)C)(C[C@H]3C)C4(C)C)C

Properties
Chemical formula	C_{22}H_{30}O_{6}
Molar mass	390.47 g/mol
- Except where otherwise noted, data are given for materials in their standard state (at 25 °C [77 °F], 100 kPa). verify (what is ?) Infobox references

Prostratin is a protein kinase C activator found in the bark of the mamala tree of Samoa, Homalanthus nutans (Euphorbiaceae). While prostratin was originally isolated and identified as a new phorbol ester from species of the genus Pimelea (Thymelaceae) in Australia, the antiviral activity of prostratin was discovered during research on the traditional knowledge of Samoan healers in Falealupo village by ethnobotanist Paul Alan Cox and a team at the U.S. National Cancer Institute. Samoan healers use the mamala tree to treat hepatitis. Research indicated that prostratin has potential to be useful in the treatment of HIV as it could flush viral reservoirs in latently infected CD4+ T-cells.

As a modulator of protein kinase C, it has been shown to exhibit promising therapeutic potential against other diseases such as cancer and Alzheimer's disease. In 2015, study showed that orally administrated prostratin repressed human pancreatic tumor.

== Overview ==
Prostratin is of interest because of its unique ability to activate latent viral reservoirs, while preventing healthy cells from infection, as well as its discovery through ethnobotany. Pioneering agreements to protect indigenous intellectual property rights of the Samoan people were established between the Samoan government and the AIDS Research Alliance, with 20% of ARA's profits to be returned to the Samoan people, and between the Samoan Government and the University of California, Berkeley where a team led by Jay Keasling is trying to isolate the gene sequence responsible for prostratin biosynthesis. Samoa and UC Berkeley agreed to share equally in any commercial proceeds from the gene product.

In 2008, a team at Stanford University led by chemist Paul Wender has published an elegant four-step chemical synthesis of prostratin from phorbol. This practical synthesis produces gram quantities of prostratin, and is a major step forward in pharmaceutical development of prostratin.

In 2010, AIDS Research Alliance in Los Angeles, California announced that it signed a new licensing agreement with Stanford University, transferring exclusive rights of the technology developed by the Stanford research team. Phase I human clinical trials of prostratin will be carried out by the AIDS ReSearch Alliance in Los Angeles, California.
