= Asian Geographic =

Magazine

ASIAN Geographic
- Categories: Geography, Culture, Heritage, Society, Environment, Exploration, Conservation
- Frequency: 8 issues annually (once every 45 days)
- First issue: September 1999
- Company: Asian Geographic Magazines Pte Ltd
- Country: Singapore
- Language: English
- Website: www.asiangeo.com
- ISSN: 0219-3310

ASIAN Geographic is a geographic magazine that focuses mainly on stories about Asia. Its motto is "Asia Without Borders". First published in 1999, it contains articles on geography, culture, heritage, society, environment, exploration, conservation and art.

As of May 2008, the magazine has a readership of over 300,000 across 44 countries. It is published by Asian Geographic Magazines Pte Ltd, which also publishes Scuba Diver AustralAsia, an official publication of the PADI Diving Society.

ASIAN Geographic PASSPORT, a travel and adventure magazine, was launched in August 2008.

Both ASIAN Geographic and PASSPORT organise expeditions, travel photography workshops and photographic competitions on a regular basis.

== History ==
When ASIAN Geographic first started out as a quarterly magazine in 1999, it focused exclusively on environmental issues; its motto was "The Journal of Our Environment". In 2000 it became a bi-monthly publication. In 2006, the magazine expanded its scope to include social and cultural issues to attract a wider readership. In 2007, ASIAN Geographic became a monthly magazine; it also adopted a new motto: “Asia Without Borders”. From 2009 it was published once every 45 days (8 issues/year), but with more pages.

== Articles ==
Currently, each issue of ASIAN Geographic focuses on a specific theme relevant to Asia. (Follow this link for the editorial themes for 2008 and 2009.) The magazine draws from a wide base of international contributors to generate its content – these include academics, geographers, sociologists, journalists, photographers and experts in various fields. A short biography of each contributor is provided at the end of every article.

== ASIAN Geographic PASSPORT ==
In August 2008, ASIAN Geographic launched PASSPORT, a magazine that focuses on travel and adventure in Asia. The publication is easily distinguished by its rounded corners, which are similar to that found in a regular passport. Its motto is "Travel Without Borders".

== Expeditions ==
ASIAN Geographic and PASSPORT have organised expeditions to places such Ladakh, India (in the Himalayas); Siem Reap, Cambodia; and its own series of Silk Road expeditions, the first of which was on the section in China, from Kashgar to Xi'an.

== Photography workshops and competitions ==
ASIAN Geographic PASSPORT organises travel photography workshops to places such as Kuching, Malaysia and Chiang Mai, Thailand. There is also an annual "Asia Without Borders" photography competition organised by ASIAN Geographic.

== Conservation efforts and partners ==
ASIAN Geographic has stated its commitment to educate and raise awareness of environmental and social issues in Asia. Its exploration and conservation partners include the Animals Asia Foundation, China Exploration and Research Society, Hornbill Project Singapore, Longitude 181 Nature, OceanNEnvironment, Seacology and the World Wide Fund for Nature (WWF).

== Awards ==
In 2001, ASIAN Geographic won the Ark Trust International Award at the Genesis Awards for "Bear Witness", a feature on the rescue efforts of Asiatic black bears in China. In the 2006 Asian Travel and Tourism Creative Awards, the magazine won a Silver Award for a photograph of an elephant bathing in a Sri Lankan reserve.

== See also ==
- National Geographic Magazine
